= List of Art Deco architecture in Europe =

This is a list of buildings that are examples of Art Deco in Europe:

== Albania ==
- Hotel Green, Tirana
- Majestik Cinema Theatre, Korca, 1927
- Palace of Culture, Korçë
- Royal Villa of Durrës (Zog's Palace), Durrës, 1937
- Supreme Court of Albania, Tirana
- Swedish Embassy, Tirana

== Armenia ==
- Armenia Marriott Hotel, Yerevan, 1958
- Cafesjian Museum of Art, Yerevan, 1980–2009

== Austria ==
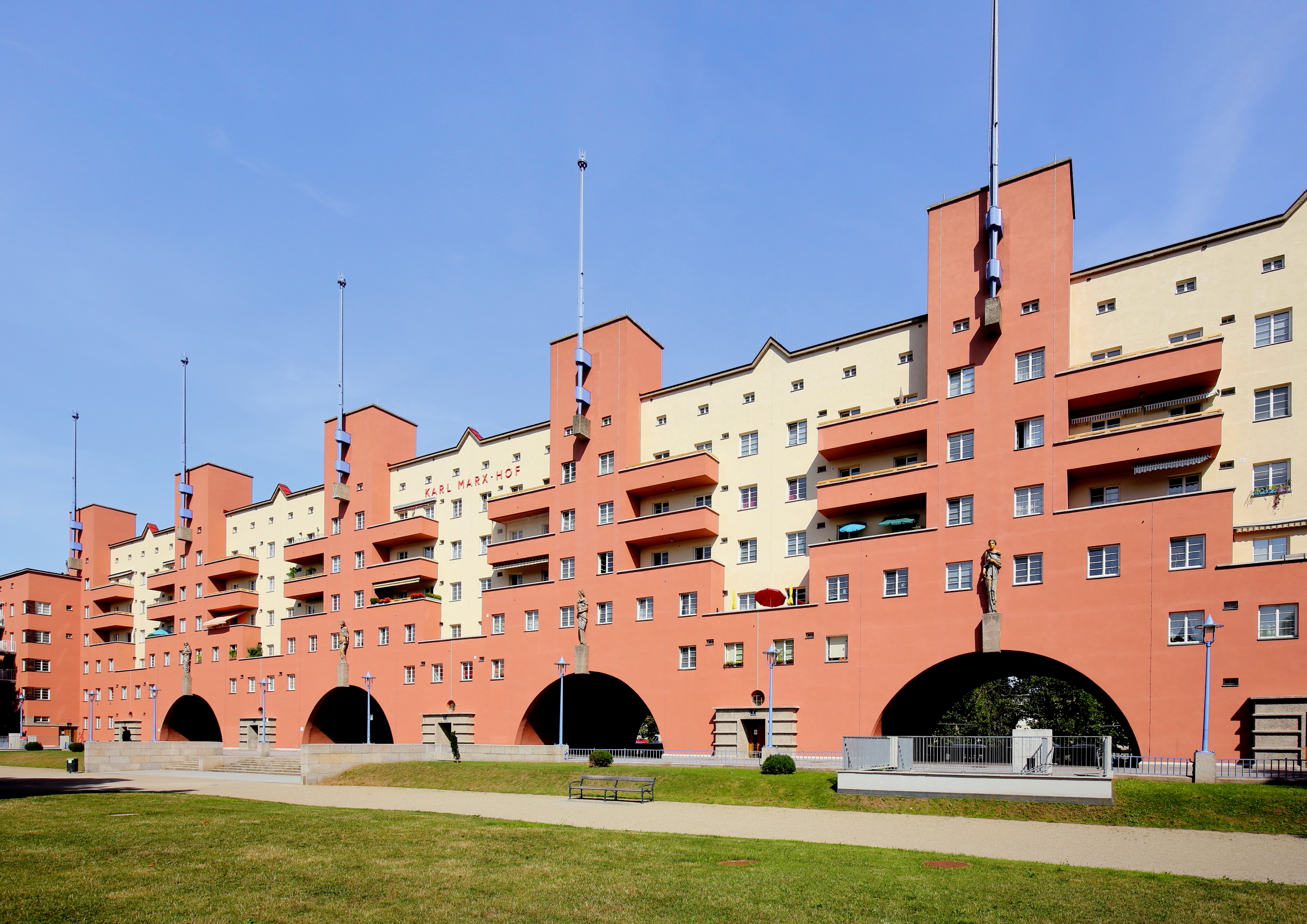
Karl-Marx-Hof, Döbling, Vienna, Austria

- 3 Blindengasse, Vienna, 1927
- Amalienbad swimming pool, Vienna, 1926
- Apollo Kino, Vienna, 1929
- Bank Austria Kunstforum Wien, Vienna, 1921
- Breitenseer Lichtspiele Theatre, Vienna, 1905
- Cinemagic Kino, Vienna, 1950
- Döbling Carmelite Nunnery Altar of Christ the King, Unterdöbling, Vienna, 1922
- Filmcasino, Vienna, 1911, 1954
- Karl-Marx-Hof, Vienna, 1930
- Sanatorium Purkersdorf, Punkersdorf, Vienna, 1903, 1927
- Trafostation Währinger Gürtel (transformer station)

== Belarus ==
- National Academic Grand Opera and Ballet Theatre of the Republic of Belarus, Minsk, 1938

== Belgium ==
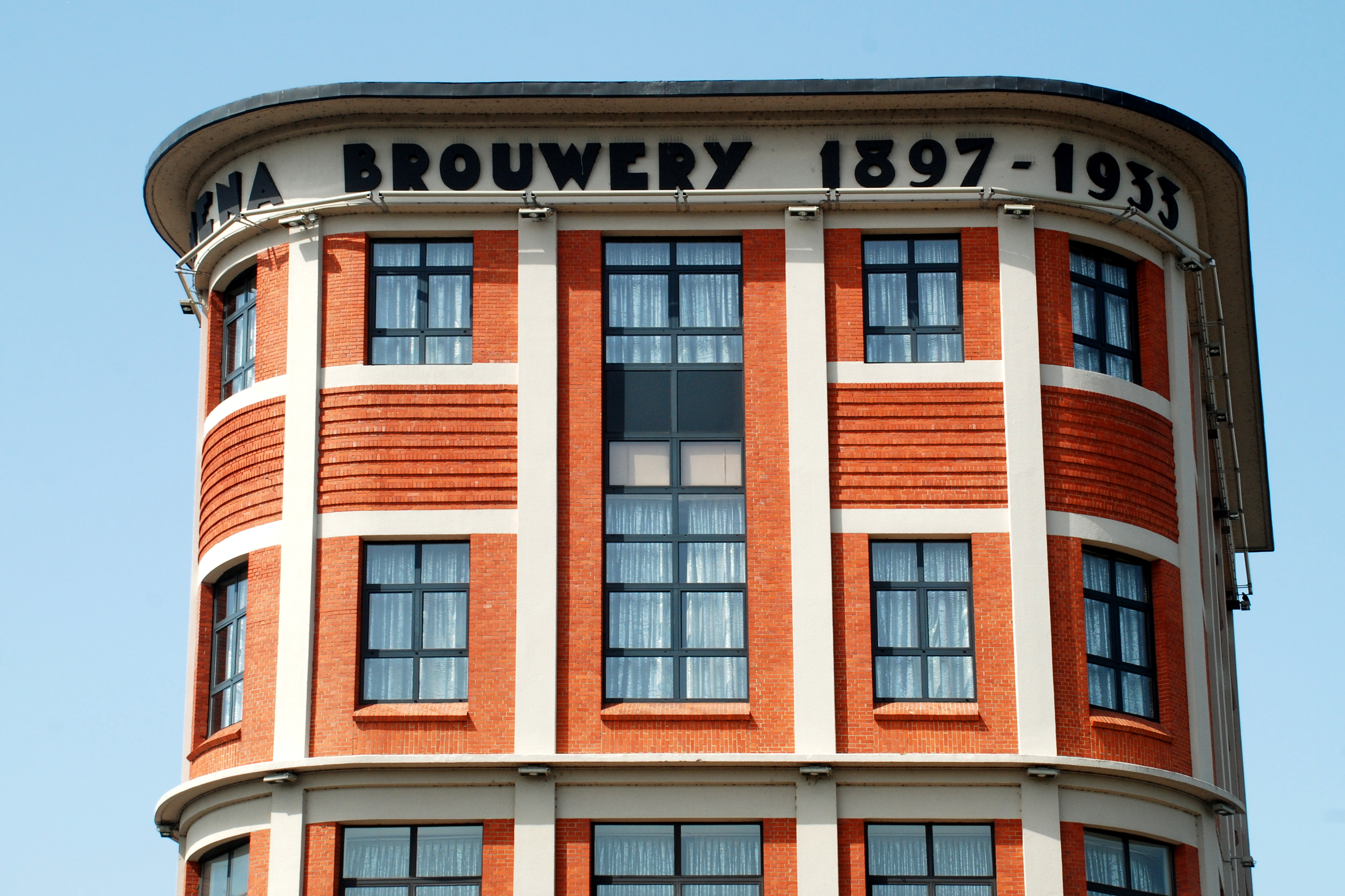
Brouwerij/Brasserie/Brewery Mena, Rostelaar, Belgium

- Brasserie Mena (Mena brewery), Rotselaar, 1933
- Château d'eau de l'Ermite, Braine-l'Alleud, 1904
- Deerlijkstraat houses numbered 11, 25, 28, 61, Zwevegem
- Edward Van Steenbergen home at 91 Strijdhoflaan, Berchem, 1925
- Heilige Familiekerk (Holy Family Church), Duinbergen, 1939
- Hôtel de ville (City Hall), Charleroi, 1936
- Klooster Sint-Norbertushuis (Monastery), Duffel, 1924
- Koningin Elisabethlaan houses numbered 10, 12, 22, 26–32, 33, 86, Sint-Niklaas, 1929
- La maison communale, Quaregnon, 1938
- Maison du Peuple, Dour, 1931
- Maison Remy, Charleroi
- Maison du Peuple, Thulin, 1926
- Maison des Trois Grâces, Charleroi
- Onze-Lieve-Vrouwekerk (Church of Our Lady), Sint-Amandsberg, 1933
- Le Palais du Comte Jean building, Blankenberge, 1929
- Pompage Station, Saint-Nicholas
- Provincial Government building, Mons, Hainaut/Hénau
- Villa Cantaert, Zottegem, 1938
- Villa Cousy, Zottegem, 1929
- Villas La Nuova and La Bella in Knokke-Heist
- Volkshuis, Sint-Niklaas, 1925
- Walburgstraat houses numbered 23, 29, 42B, Sint-Niklaas

=== Antwerp ===
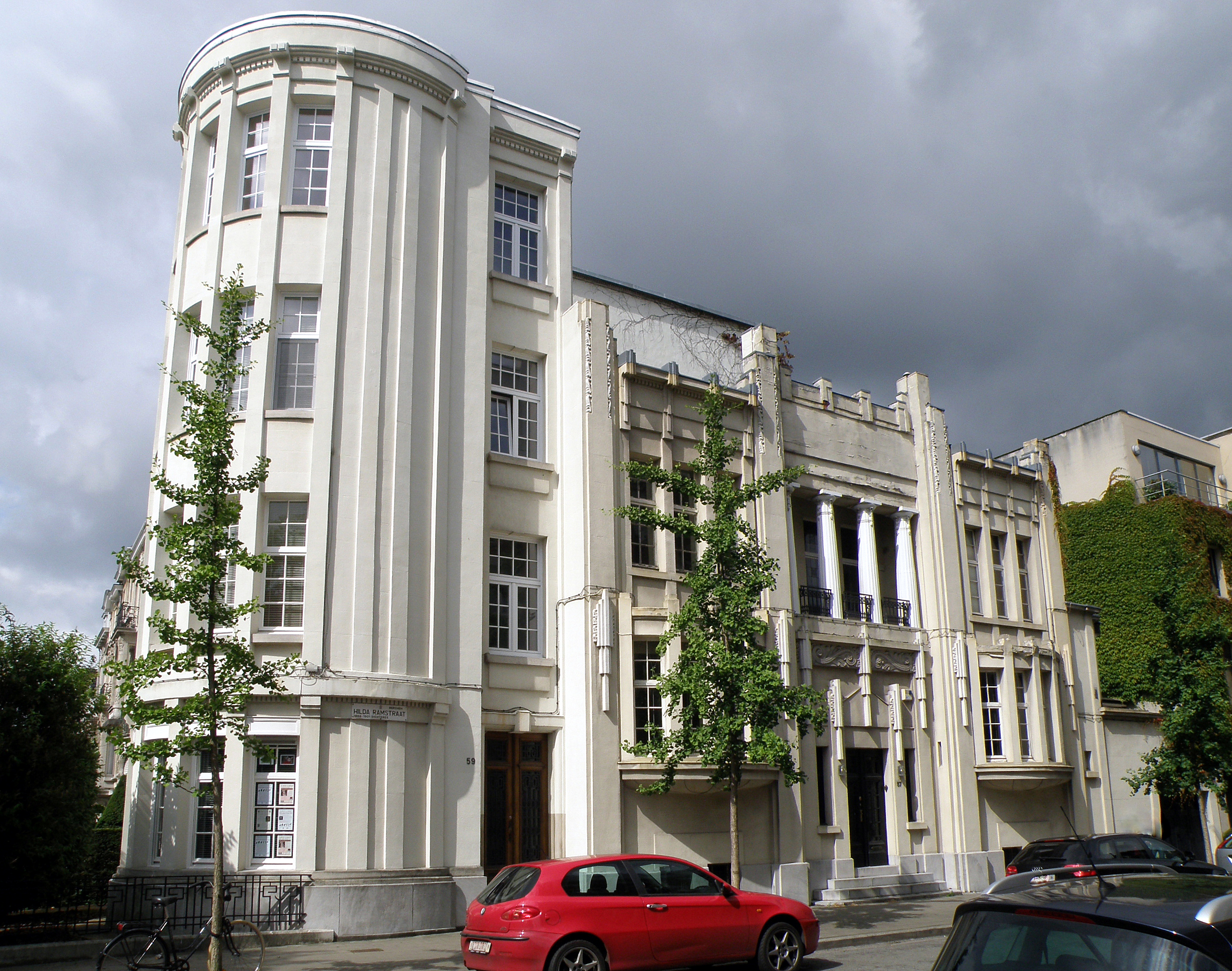
57–59 Hilda Ramstraat/Koninklijkelaan, Antwerp, Belgium

- 57–59 Hilda Ramstraat, Berchem, Antwerp, 1923
- Belgische Fruitbeurs (Belgian fruit market), Antwerp, 1936
- Boerentoren (now the KBC Tower), Antwerp, 1931
- Christus Koningkerk (Church of Christ the King), Antwerp, 1930
- former Fire Station (Caserne de sapeurs-pompiers), Halenstraat, Antwerp, 1947
- Hopland Street apartments, Antwerp, 1921
- De Liana-Halle school building, Doerne, Antwerp, 1923
- Maison Tilquin, Antwerp, 1933
- Parochiekerk Onze-Lieve-Vrouw Altijddurende Bijstand (Parish Church of Our Lady of Continuous Assistance), Deurne, Antwerp, 1925
- Pestalozzistraat school complex, Antwerp, 1931
- Provinciaal Technisch Instituut, Deurne, Antwerp, 1923
- Résidence Isabelle, Klein-Antwerpen, Antwerp, 1932
- Residentie Van Rijswijck apartments, Antwerp, 1932
- De Roma Theatre, Antwerp, 1928
- Sint-Annatunnel/Voetgangerstunnel (pedestrian tunnel), Antwerp, 1933
- Sint-Laurentiuskerk, Antwerp, 1934
- Sint-Lievenscollege, Antwerp, 1932
- Swimming pool at Veldstraat, Antwerp, 1926

=== Brussels ===
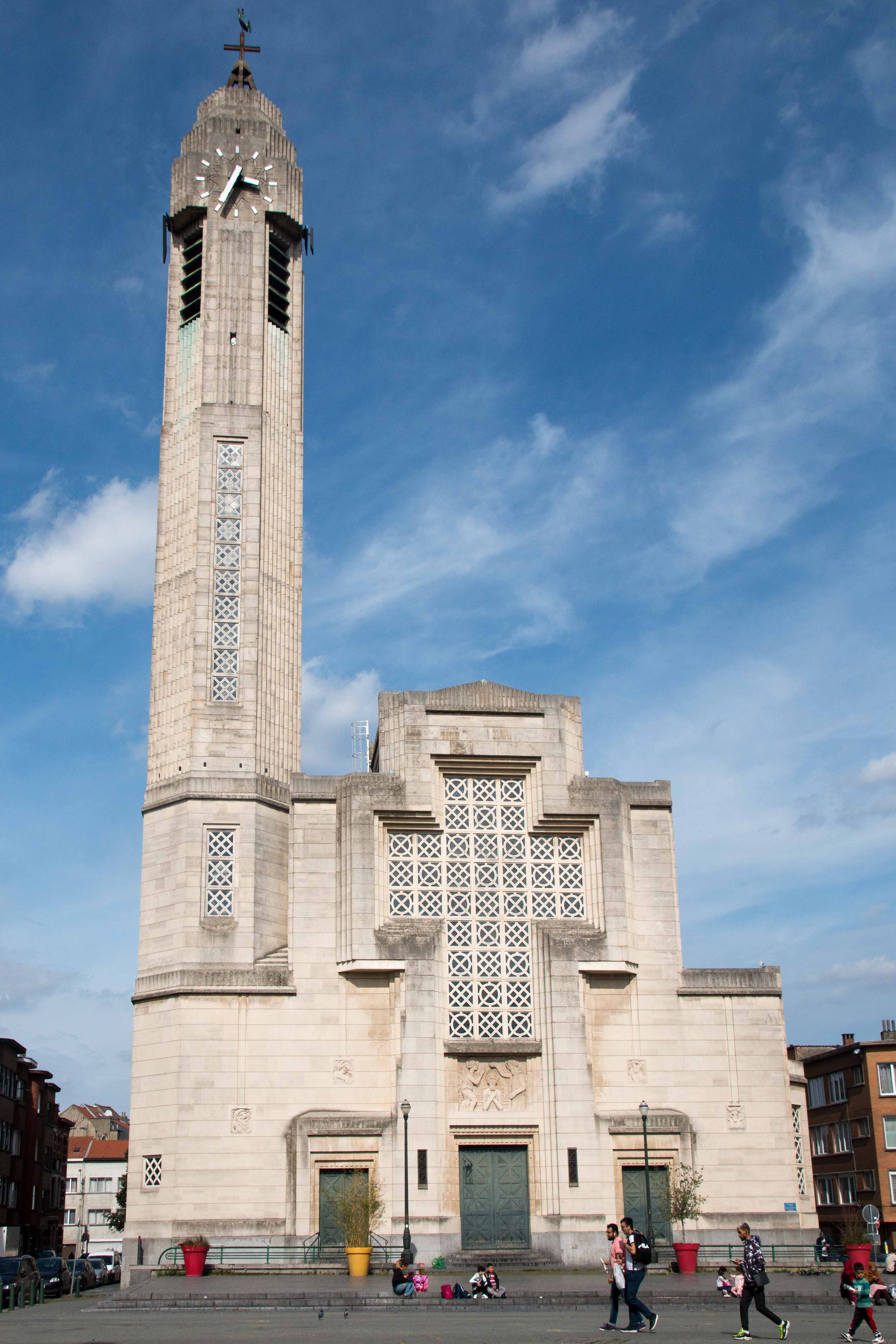
Church of St. John the Baptist, Molenbeek, Brussels, Belgium

- 210, Avenue Molière/Molièrelaan, Ixelles, Brussels, 1929
- ''L'Archiduc'' Jazz Club, Brussels
- Aux Armes des Brasseurs café by Adrien Blomme, Brussels, 1939
- Baths of Saint-Josse-ten-Noode, Brussels, 1933
- former ''Banque Agricole de Belgique'' headquarters, Brussels, 1929
- Brussels-Central railway station, Brussels, 1952
- Centre Culturel Jacques Franck, Brussels, 1930s
- Centre for Fine Arts by Victor Horta, Brussels, 1928
- Church of the Holy Family, Schaerbeek, Brussels, 1932
- Church of St. Augustine, Forest, Brussels, 1935
- Church of St. John the Baptist, Molenbeek, Brussels, 1931
- Church of St. Suzanna, Schaerbeek, Brussels, 1928
- Church of St. Vincent and Paul, Anderlecht, Brussels, 1937
- Clockarium, Schaerbeek, Brussels, 1935
- Complexe Albert Hall, Brussels, 1932
- former Eastman Dental Hospital (now the House of European History), Brussels, 1935
- Électrorail headquarters building, Brussels, 1931
- Flagey Building (formerly the Radio House), Brussels, 1938
- Forest's Town Hall, Brussels, 1938
- Galeries Cinema, Brussels, 1939
- Gérard Koninckx Frères building, Brussels, 1928
- Halles America, Brussels, 1921
- Hôtel Albert Ier, Brussels, 1928
- Hôtel Atlanta, Brussels, 1928
- Hôtel Haerens, Brussels, 1931
- Hôtel Le Plaza, Brussels, 1930
- Hôtel Siru, Brussels, 1929
- Hôtel Wielemans, Brussels, 1925
- ''Kapelleveld'' Garden City, Woluwe-Saint-Lambert, Brussels, 1923–1926
- La Magnéto belge bed and breakfast, Brussels, 1942
- former Maternity of Ixelles Hospital, Ixelles, Brussels
- Medical and Surgical Institute of the Red Cross, Brussels, 1926
- ''Métropole'' Cinema, Brussels, 1932
- former ''Movy Club'' Cinema, Forest, Brussels, 1934
- Van Buuren Museum & Gardens, Uccle, Brussels, 1925
- National Basilica of the Sacred Heart, Brussels, 1970
- Palais de la Folle Chanson, Brussels, 1928
- Primary school by Charles Van Nueten, Dieleghem, 1921
- Résidence de la Cambre, Brussels, 1939
- Residence Palace (now part of the Europa building), European Quarter, Brussels, 1927
- RVS building (Rotterdamsche Verzekering Societeiten), Brussels, 1936
- Shell building, Rue Ravenstein, Brussels, 1934
- Stoclet Palace, Brussels, 1911
- Theatre Marni, Ixelles, Brussels, 1948
- UGC De Brouckère cinema, Brussels, 1933
- Vendome Cinema (formerly Le Roy Cinema) Upper Town, Brussels, 1939
- Villa Empain, Brussels, 1934
- Wielemans-Ceuppens Brewery, Brussels, 1930
- Woluwe-Saint-Lambert's Town Hall, Brussels

=== Ghent ===
- Brouwerij Excelsior (Excelsior brewery), Ghent, 1929
- ''De Vooruit'' newspaper Building, Ghent, 1930
- Boekentoren (University Library Tower), Ghent University, Ghent, 1935

=== Liège ===
- Churchill Theatre, Liège, 1993
- Cine Midi-Minuit, Liège
- Le Forum, Liège, 1922
- Interallied Memorial of Cointe (Tower of the Interallied Memorial), Liège, 1935
- Passage Lemonnier, Liège, 1839, 1937
- Le Petit Paradis apartments, Quai de Rome, Liège
- Place Vivegins former store, Liège
- Trocadéro Theatre, Liège, 1926

== Bosnia and Herzegovina ==
- Central Bank of Bosnia and Herzegovina (formerly Mortgage Bank and Narodna Banka), Sarajevo, 1929
- Džidžikovac apartment complex, Sarajevo, 1948
- Pension Fund Building, Sarajevo, 1940
- Red Cross Building, Sarajevo, 1928

== Bulgaria ==
- The Beach apartments, Varna, 1933
- Bulgarian National Film Archive, Sofia, 1935

== Croatia ==
- Hotel Dubrovnik (formerly Hotel Milinov), Zagreb, 1929
- Kastner and Öhler department store (NAMA), Zagreb, 1928

== Cyprus ==
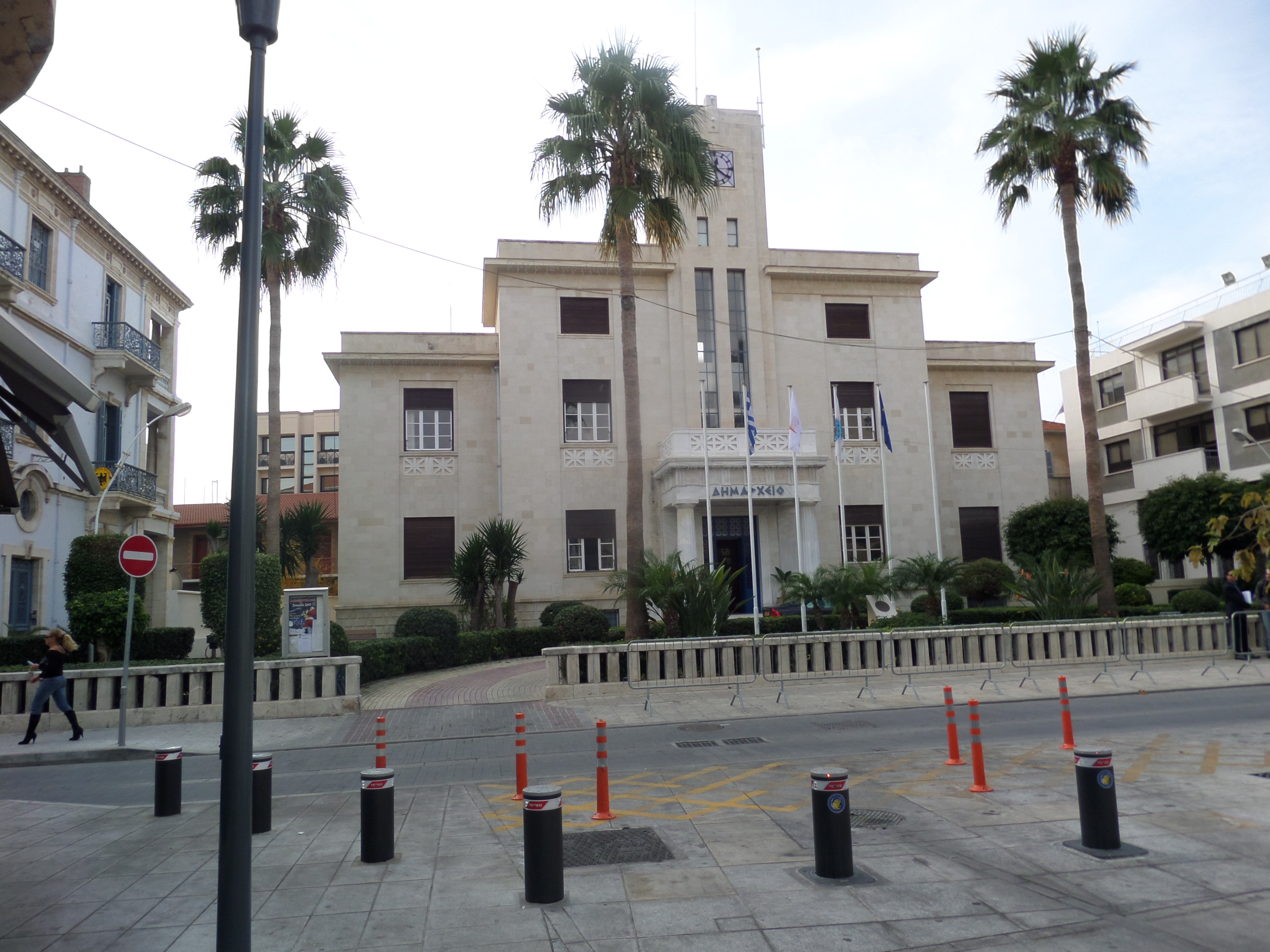
Town Hall, Limassol, Cyprus

- Achiilleion Building, Old Town, Nicosia
- Bank of Cyprus, Limassol, 1947
- former Bank of Cyprus, Morphou
- former Evkaf Hotel, Old Town, Nicosia, 1958-1962
- Lantis Brothers Coca-Cola Plant, Nicosia-Engomi, 1952
- Municipal Market, Nicosia, 1930s
- Municipal Market, Idskele
- Nicolaou Press building, Old Town, Nicosia, 1938
- Nicosia Palace Hotel, Old Town, Nicosia, 1930s
- Pallas Cinema, Old Town, Nicosia
- Post Office, Land Department, and Courts, Morphou (Guzelyurt)
- Public Hospital, Limassol
- Rex Cinema, Limassol
- Rialto Cinematic Theatre, Limassol, 1930s
- Severeios Library, Old Town, Nicosia, 1949
- Sokrates Hotel, City Center, Kyrenia (Girne)
- Telecommunications Building, Nicosia
- Town Hall, Limassol
- former wine factory, Old Port, Limassol

== Czech Republic ==
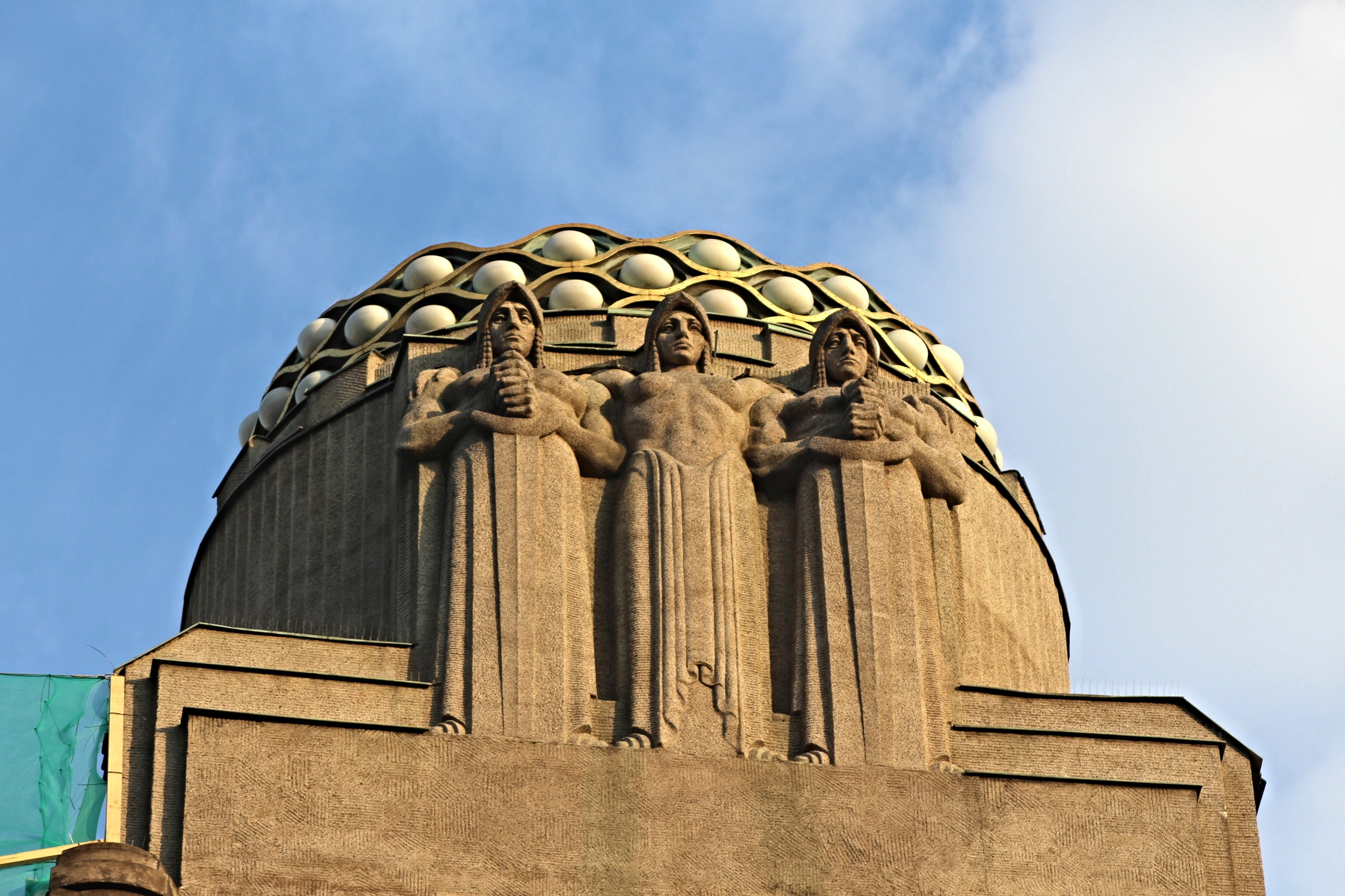
Palác Koruna, Prague, Czech Republic

- Arnoldova Villa, Brno
- Art Deco House, Zámecká, Mělník
- Budova Státní odborné školy koželužské (State Tannery School), Hradec Králové, 1925
- Historická budova Muzea východních Čech (East Bohemian Museum), Hradec Králové, 1913
- Pardubice Crematorium, Pardubice, 1923
- Fara House, Pelhrimov, 1913
- Hotel Alcron, Prague, 1926
- Hotel Atlantic Palace, Karlovy Vary, 1912
- Hotel Imperial Cafe, Prague
- Hotel Vítkov, Žižkov, Prague
- Hradec Králové train station, Hradec Králové, 1935
- Husův sbor (Hussite church), České Budějovice, 1924
- Kino Ořechovka (Cinema at the Ořechovka Central Building), Prague, 1923
- Kino Vzlet (Cinema), 1921
- Moučkova Villa, Liběchov
- Palác Akropolis (Palace), Prague
- Palác Hvězda (Melantrich Building - Marks and Spencer), Wenceslas Square, Prague, 1913
- Palác Koruna (Palace), Prague, 1912
- Park Inn Hotel, Prague, Prague, 1921
- Former Savoy Café, Zátka waterfront, České Budějovice
- Steinského palác, Hradec Králové, 1929
- Šupich Houses (Palác Rokoko), Prague, 1916
- Vila Viktora Kříže, Pardubice, 1925
- Villa of Josef Kovářík, Prostějov, 1921
- Vila Waldekova, Hradec Králové, 1933
- Vrchlického sadech Kiosk, Prague

== Denmark ==
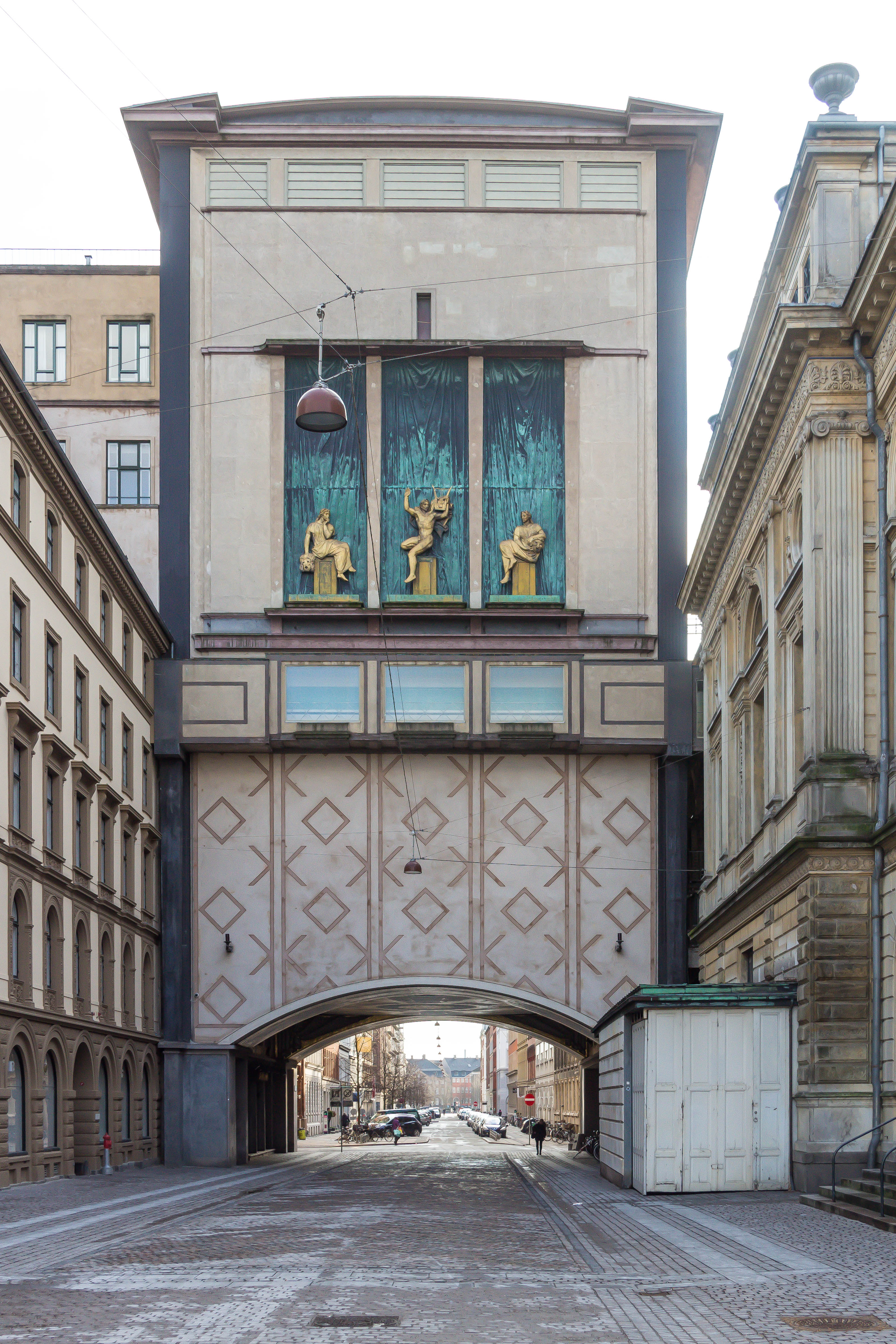
Stærekassen Theatre, Copenhagen, Denmark

- Bellevue Theatre, Copenhagen, 1936
- Dagmarteatret (Dagmar Theatre), Copenhagen, 1883, 1937
- Danske Spritvebrikker (Distillers), Aalborg, 1931
- Hotel Astoria, Copenhagen, 1935
- Metropol (formerly Palads Teatret), Aarhus, 1951
- Novo Nordisk/Novozymes Factory, Copenhagen, 1935
- Richshuset Building, Copenhagen, 1936
- The Standard Building (former Customs Office), Copenhagen, 1937
- Stærekassen (New Theatre), Copenhagen, 1931
- Svaneapoteket (former Pharmacy), Copenhagen, 1934

== Estonia ==
- Eestimaa Kinnituse AS building on Vabaduse väljak (Freedom Square), Tallinn, 1932
- Inges Kindlustus insurance office, Tallinn
- Kolm Lille florist, Tallinn
- Rannahotell Beach Hotel, Pärnu, 1937

== Finland ==
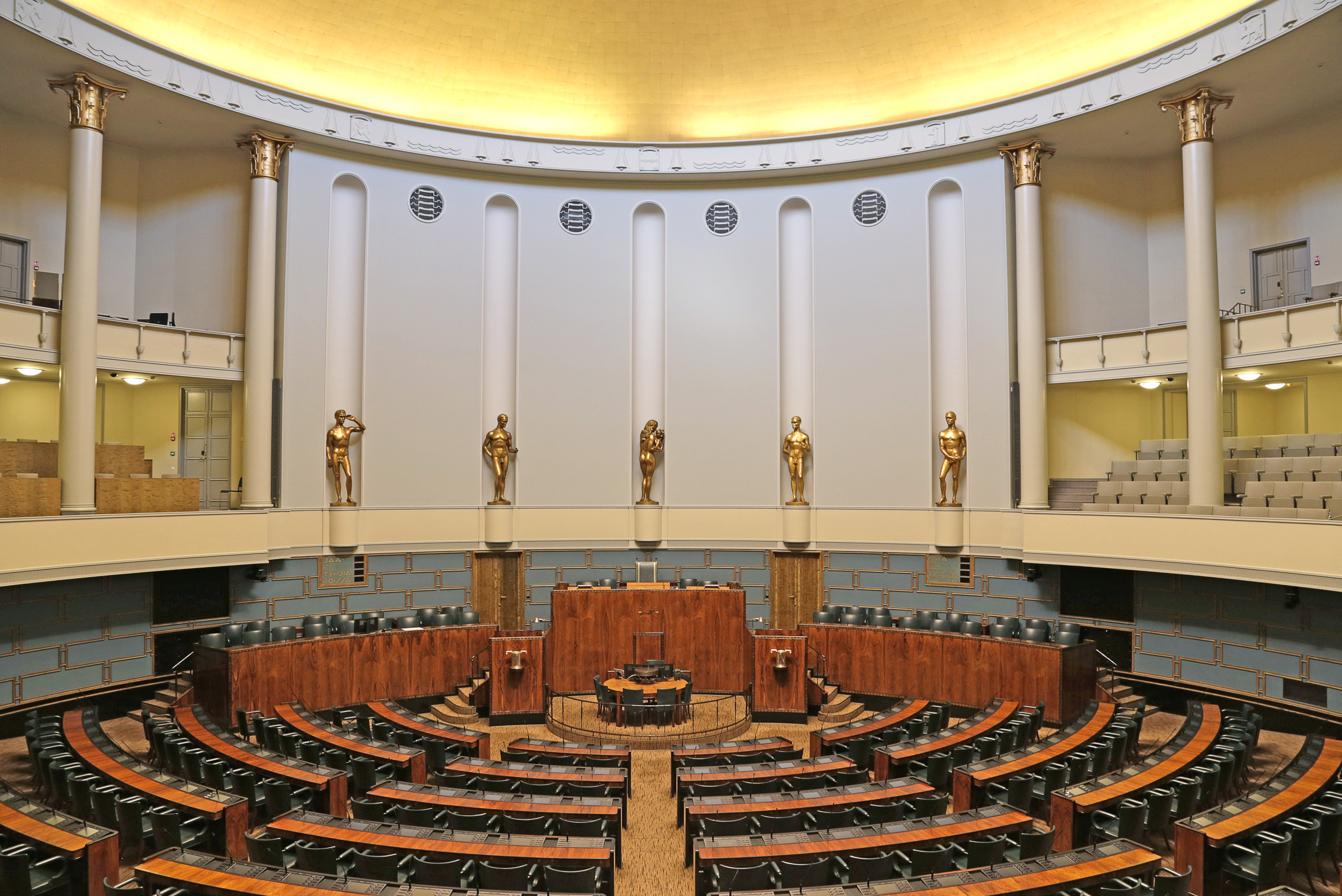
The Session Hall of the Parliament House of Finland from 1931 by J. S. Sirén (sculptures by Wäinö Aaltonen)

- Apartments at Jääkärinkatu 13, Helsinki,1931
- Apartments at Kasarminkatu 8, Helsinki, 1935
- FC Perintä Oy offices, Helsinki, 1927
- Fida Roba store, Helskini, 1938
- Finnkino Tennispalatsi Theatre (former tennis courts), Helsinki, 1938, 1999
- Galleria Sinne, Helsinki, 1938
- Helsinki Central Station, Helsinki, 1919
- Helsinki Olympic Stadium, Helsinki, 1938
- Hotel Lilla Roberts, Helsinki, 1929
- Hotell Torni, Helsinki, 1931
- Lasipalatsi Film and Media Centre (formerly Bio Rex), Helsinki
- New Student Union Building, Helsinki,
- Orion Theatre, Helsinki, 1920
- Pori Railway Station, Pori, 1938
- Savoy Theatre, Helsinki, 1937
- Yrjönkatu Swimming Hall, Kamppi, Helsinki, 1928

== France ==
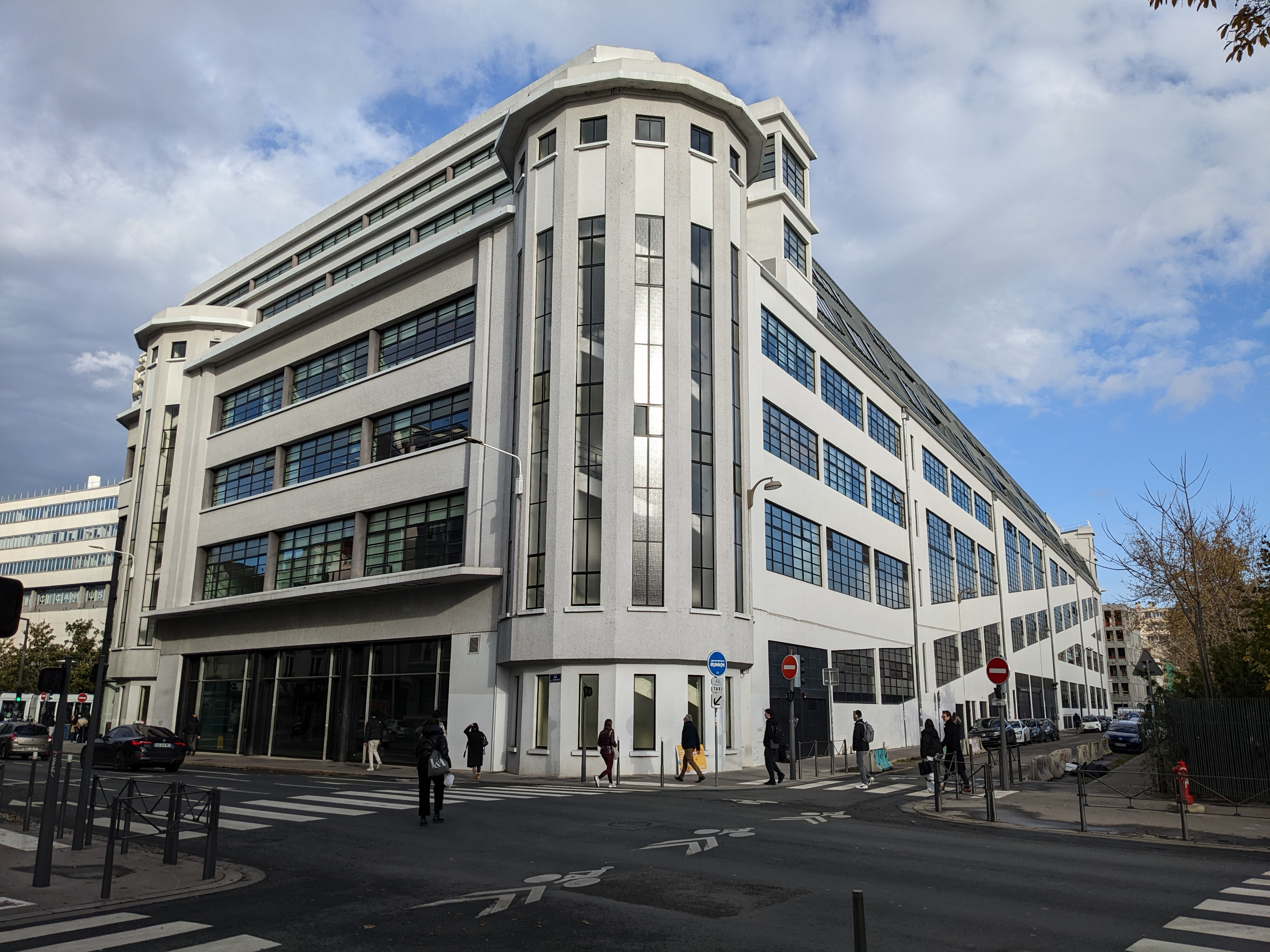
Garage Citroën, Lyon, France

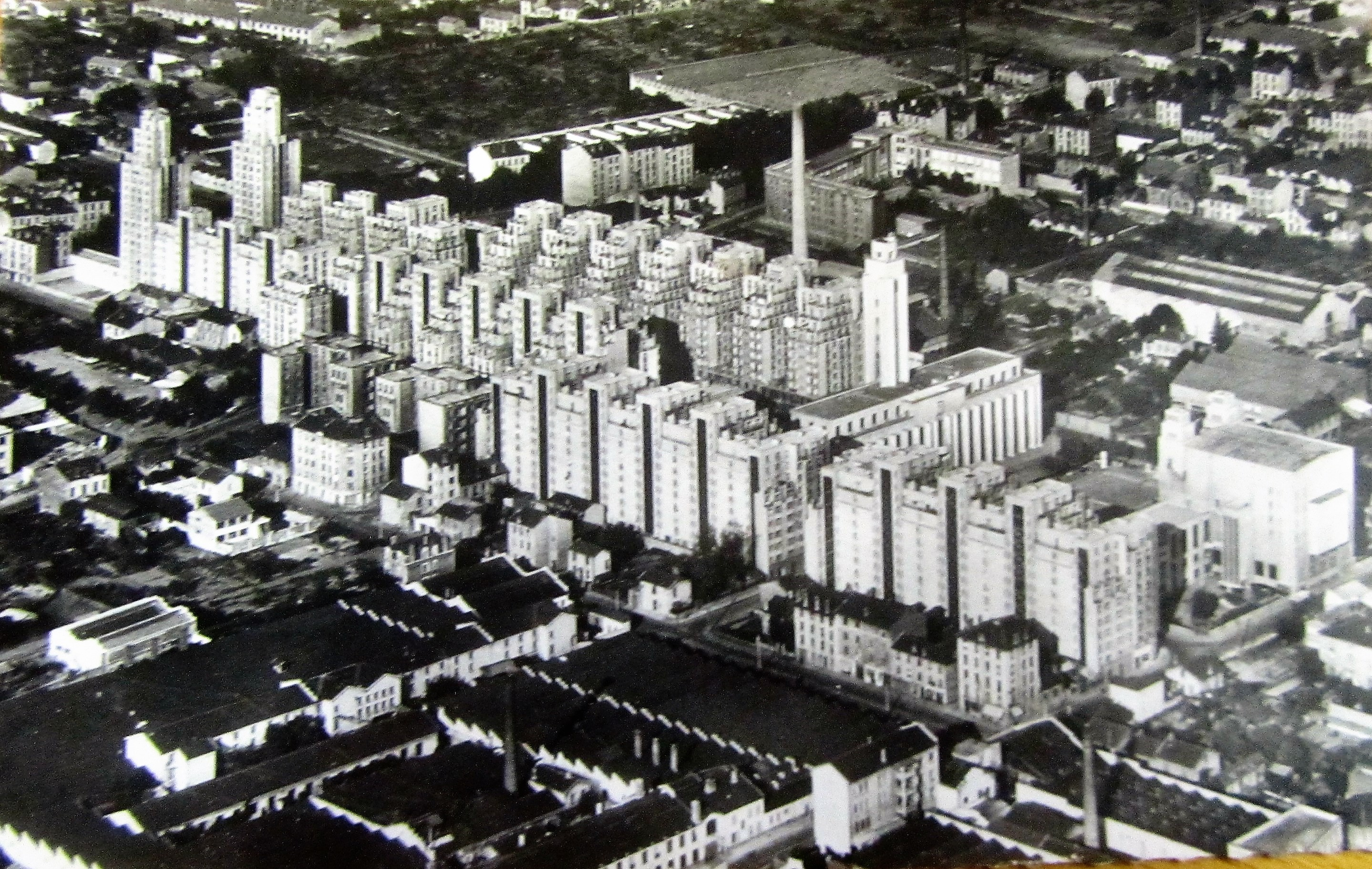
Gratte-Ciel, Villeurbanne, the first ever skyscrapers in France.

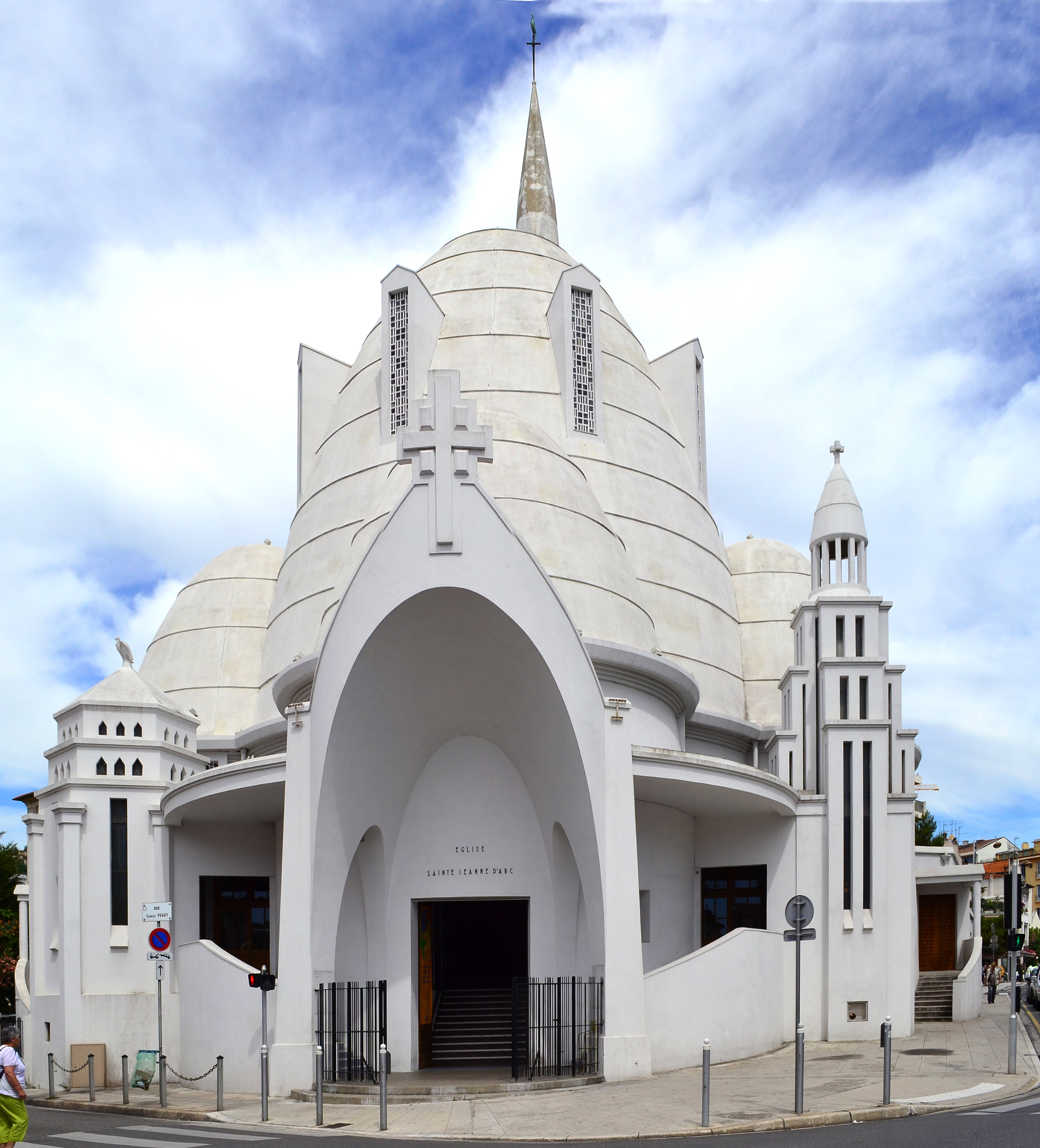
Sainte Jeanne d'Arc Church, Nice, France

- Atrium Casino, Dax, 1928
- Belfry of the City Hall, Lille, 1932
- Casino Municipal, Biarritz, Pyrénées-Atlantiques, 1929
- Cinéma Eden, Saint-Jean-d'Angély, 1931
- Douaumont Ossuary, Douaumont, 1932
- Ecole élémentaire Aristide Briand (elementary school), Lyon, 1932
- École supérieure des arts et techniques de la mode (ESMOD), Lyon
- Église Sainte-Agnès de Maisons-Alfort, Maisons-Alfort, Val-de-Marne, 1933
- Église Saint-Remi de Roupy, Roupy, Aisne, Hauts-de-France, 1922
- Garage Citroën, Lyon, 1930-1932
- Gare Maritime de Cherbourg, Cherbourg, 1933
- Gare de Rouen Rue Verte, Rouen, Normandy, 1928
- Grand Hôtel, Bureau des Aciéries de Longwy, Longlaville, Lorraine, 1928
- Grand-Place de Béthune, Béthune, 1927
- Gratte-Ciel, Villeurbanne, 1936
- Halle Tony Garnier, Lyon, 1988
- Helene Boucher High School, Paris, 1935
- Hotel Belvédère du Rayon Vert, Cerbère, 1932
- Hôtel Martinez, Cannes, 1929
- Hôtel Splendid, Dax, Landes, 1928
- Inmueble CGA (CGA Building), Nantes, 1935
- L'Armendèche Lighthouse, Les Sables-d'Olonne. 1968
- Museum/aquarium, Nancy, 1933
- Notre-Dame Auxiliaire church, Nice, 1933
- Palais de la Méditerranée, Nice, 1929
- Paris–Le Bourget Airport, Le Bourget, 1919
- Parking Garage, Plomb
- Pathé-Bellecour cinema, Lyon, 1933
- La Piscine Museum, Roubaix, 1932
- Sainte Jeanne d'Arc Church, Nice, completed 1934
- Sainte-Thérèse-de-l'Enfant-Jésus Church, Hirson, Aisne, 1929
- Stade Chaban-Delmas, Bordeaux, Gironde, 1930
- Théâtre de l'Eperon, Angoulême, 1962
- Thiepval Memorial, Thiepval, Picardy, 1932
- Cherbourg Maritime station (Rail station and harbor), Cherbourg, 1933

=== Beausoleil, Provence-Alpes-Côte d'Azur ===
- Jardins d'Elisa, Beausoleil, Provence-Alpes-Côte d'Azur
- Maison Bleue/Blue Villa, Barcelonnette, Provence-Alpes-Côte d'Azur, 1931
- Mirador, Beausoleil, Provence-Alpes-Côte d'Azur
- Palais Mary, Beausoleil
- Palais Stella, Beausoleil
- Post Office, Beausoleil
- Sea View Residence, Beausoleil

=== Bordeaux ===
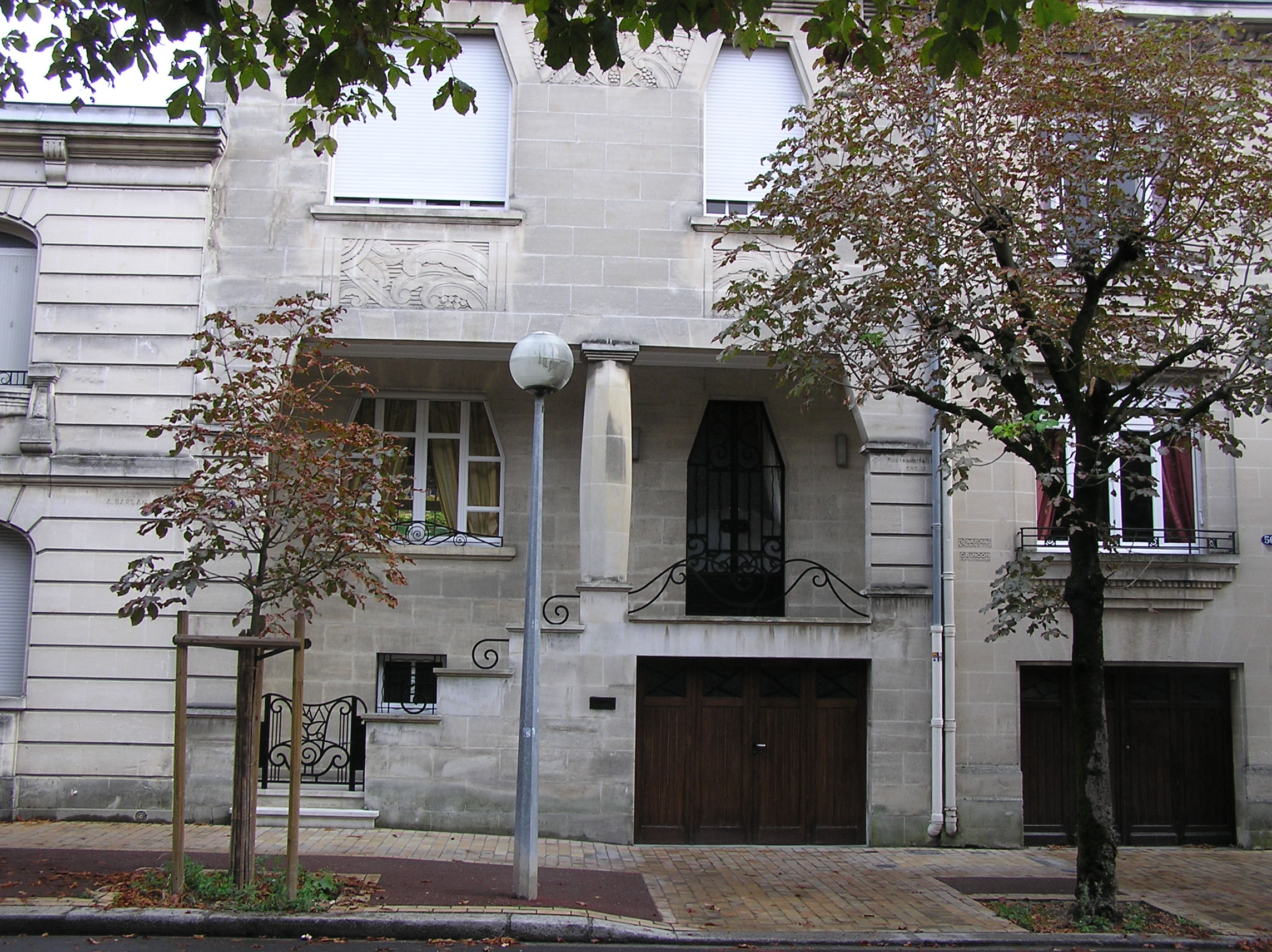
House of the Lescure district, Bordeaux, France

- Bourse du travail de Bordeaux (Labor exchange board), Victoire, Bordeaux, 1938.
- Café du Levant, Bordeaux, 1923.
- Chaban-Delmas Stadium, Bordeaux, 1938.
- Lescure district, Bordeaux.
- Old Post Office of Saint-Jean, Bordeaux, 1929.
- Hôtel Frugès, Bordeaux, 1878, 1927.
- Maison cantonale, La Bastide, Bordeaux, 1925.
- Gaz de Bordeaux building, Bordeaux, 1930.
- Piscine judaïque (Judaic pool), Bordeaux, 1925.
- Piscine municipale de Bègles (Municipal pool), Bègles (Bordeaux suburb), 1925.
- Public baths, La Bastide, Bordeaux.
- Maison Saint-Louis Beaulieu, diocesan house, 1937–40.
- Théâtre la Pergola, Caudéran, Bordeaux, 1927.
- Interior of the Maison du vin, house of the winemaker and winetrader union.
- Gare Saint-Louis, former station, now commercial center.
- Bains-douches du Bouscat, public baths, Le Bouscat (Bordeaux suburb).

=== Limoges ===
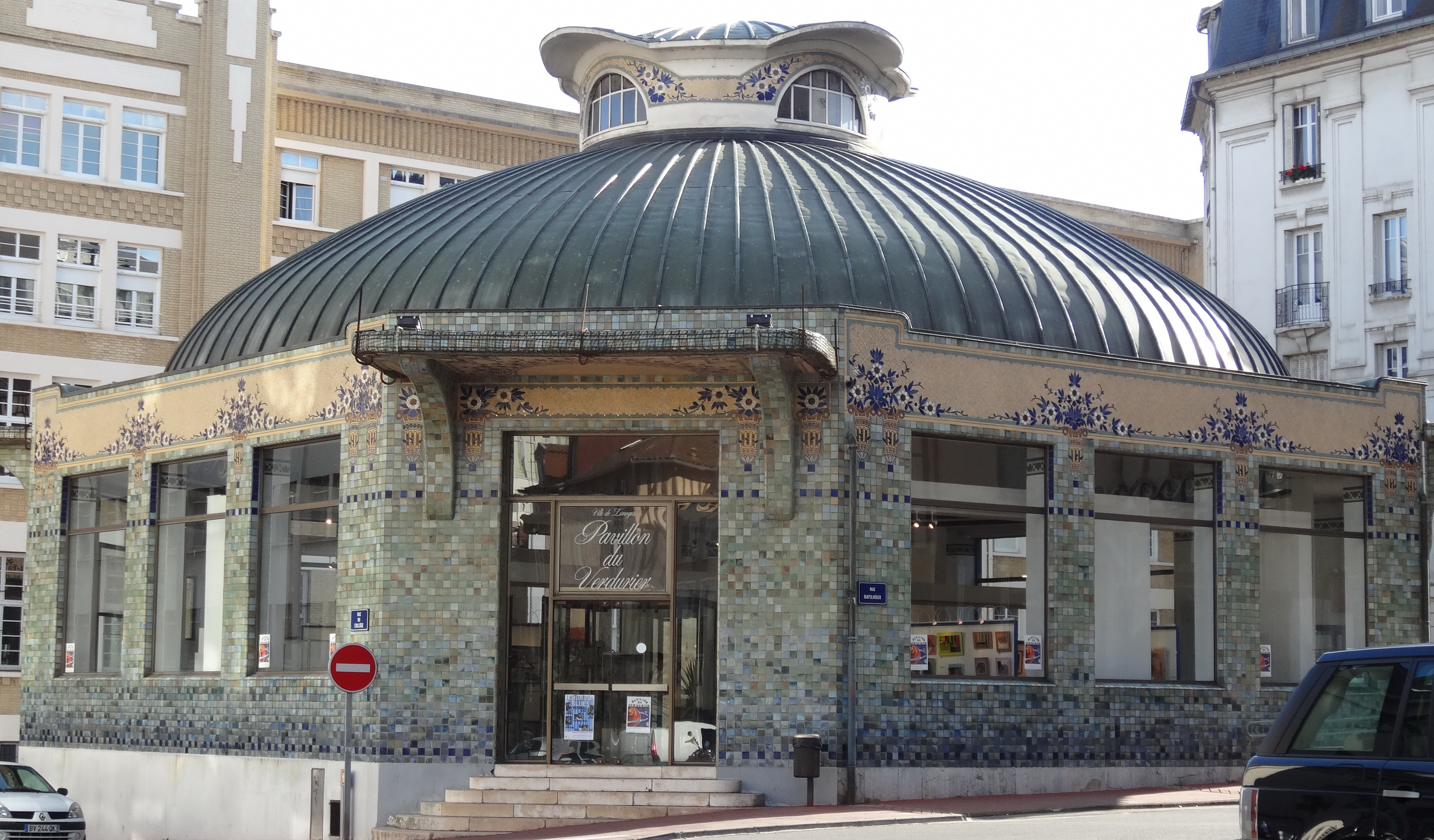
Pavillon du Verdurier, Limoges, France

- Cité des Coutures, Limoges, 1925–1932
- Cité-jardin de Beaublanc, Limoges, 1924
- Gare de Limoges-Bénédictins, Limoges, 1929
- Pavillon du Verdurier, Limoges, 1919

=== Paris ===
Folies Bergère, Paris, France

- L'Arlequin cinema, 6th Arrondissement, Paris, 1930
- Le Balzac cinema, 8th Arrondissement, Paris, 1935
- Le Brady cinema, 10th Arrondissement, Paris, 1956
- Cinéma Mac Mahon, 17th Arrondissement, Paris, 1938
- Comédia theatre, 10th, Paris, 1858, 1932
- Folies Bergère, 9th Arrondissement, Paris, 1868, 1926
- Gaumont-Opéra, 9th Arrondissement, Paris, 1927
- Grand Rex, 2nd Arrondissement, Paris, 1932
- Hôtel Lutetia, 6th Arrondissement, Paris, 1910
- Le Louxor cinema, 10th, Paris, 1921
- Lycée Hélène Boucher, 20th Arrondissement, Paris, 1935
- Maison de la Mutualité, 5th Arrondissement, Paris
- Majestic Bastille cinema, 11th, Paris, 1934
- Max Linder Panorama cinema, 9th, Paris, 1914, 1932
- Olympia cinema, 9th, Paris, 1893, 1954
- Palais de Chaillot, 16th Arrondissement, Paris, 1937
- Palais de la Porte Dorée, 12th Arrondissement, Paris, 1931
- Palais de Tokyo, 16th Arrondissement, Paris, 1937
- Pelleport station (Paris Metro), 20th Arrondissement, Paris, 1921
- Piscine Molitor, 16th Arrondissement, Paris, 1929
- Place des Fêtes station (Paris Metro), 19th Arrondissement, Paris, 1911
- Porte des Lilas station (Paris Metro), 19th Arrondissement, Paris, 1921
- Saint-Esprit Church, 12th Arrondissement, Paris, 1928–1935
- Saint-Fargeau station (Paris Metro), 20th Arrondissement, Paris, 1921
- Saint Jean-Baptiste Church, Bagnoles de l'Orne, France (Olivier Michelin, 1934–1935)
- Studio Raspail, 14th, Paris, 1934
- La Samaritaine, 1st Arrondissement, Paris, 1869, 1928
- Théâtre de la Michodière, 2nd Arrondissement, Paris, 1925
- Théâtre des Champs-Élysées, 8h Arrondissement, Paris, 1913,
- Trocadéro, 16th Arrondissement, Paris, 1937
- UGC Grand Normandie Cinema, Paris, 1937, 1969
- Vaneau station (Paris Metro), 7th Arrondissement, Paris, 1923
- Villa La Roche/Maison La Roche, 16th Arrondissement, Paris, 1925
- Le Zèbre theatre, 11th, Paris, 1939

=== Reims ===
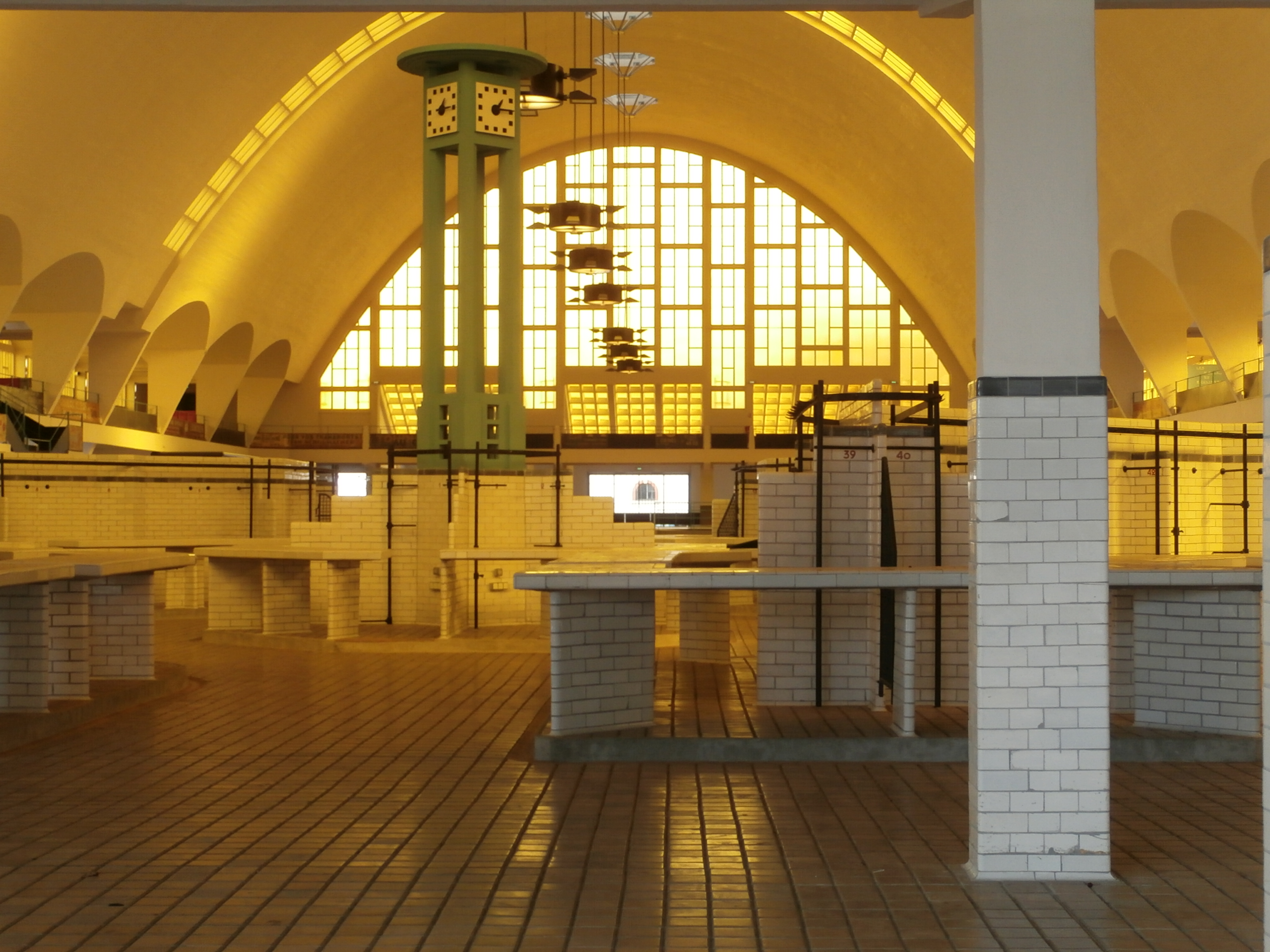
Halles Boulingrin (Central Market), Reims, France

- Carnegie Library of Reims, Reims, 1927
- Cellier d'expédition Mumm, Reims
- Foujita Chapel, Reims, 1964
- Cinéma Opéra, Reims, 1923
- Comptoir de l’Industrie Maison L. Laurent et Carrée, Reims, 1922
- Église Saint-Nicaise de Reims, Reims, 1924
- Familistère of Reims, 1925
- former Galeries on Rue Docteur-Jacquin, Reims, 1934
- Halles Centrales/Halles du Boulingrin (Central market), Reims, 1929
- Hôtel de la Mutualité, Reims, 1926
- Hôtel des Postes (Post office), Reims, 1930
- Reims Opera House interior, Reims, 1873, 1930
- Piscine du Tennis-Club (Tennis Club pool), Reims, 1923
- Villa Douce, Reims, 1934

=== Saint-Quentin ===
- former Le Carillon theatre, San Quentin, Aisne, Hauts-de-France
- Chapelle Sainte-Thérèse-de-l'Enfant-Jésus de Neuville, Ville de Saint-Quentin, Aisne, Hauts-de-France, 1933
- Conservatoire de Musique et de Théâtre, Saint-Quentin, Aisne, Hauts-de-France
- École de musique de Saint-Quentin, Saint-Quentin, Aisne, Hauts-de-France
- Église Saint-Blaise de Vichy, Vichy, Auvergne-Rhône-Alpes, 1672, 1931
- Gare de Saint-Quentin railway station, Saint-Quentin, Aisne, Hauts-de-France, 1926
- Hôtel de Ville (''salle du Conseil municipal'',), Saint-Quentin, Aisne, Hauts-de-France, 1925
- La Poste, rue de Lyon (Post office), Saint-Quentin, Aisne, Hauts-de-France, 1929

== Georgia ==
- Biltmore Hotel, Tbilisi, 1938
- Marjanishvili Theatre, Tbilisi, 1928

== Germany ==
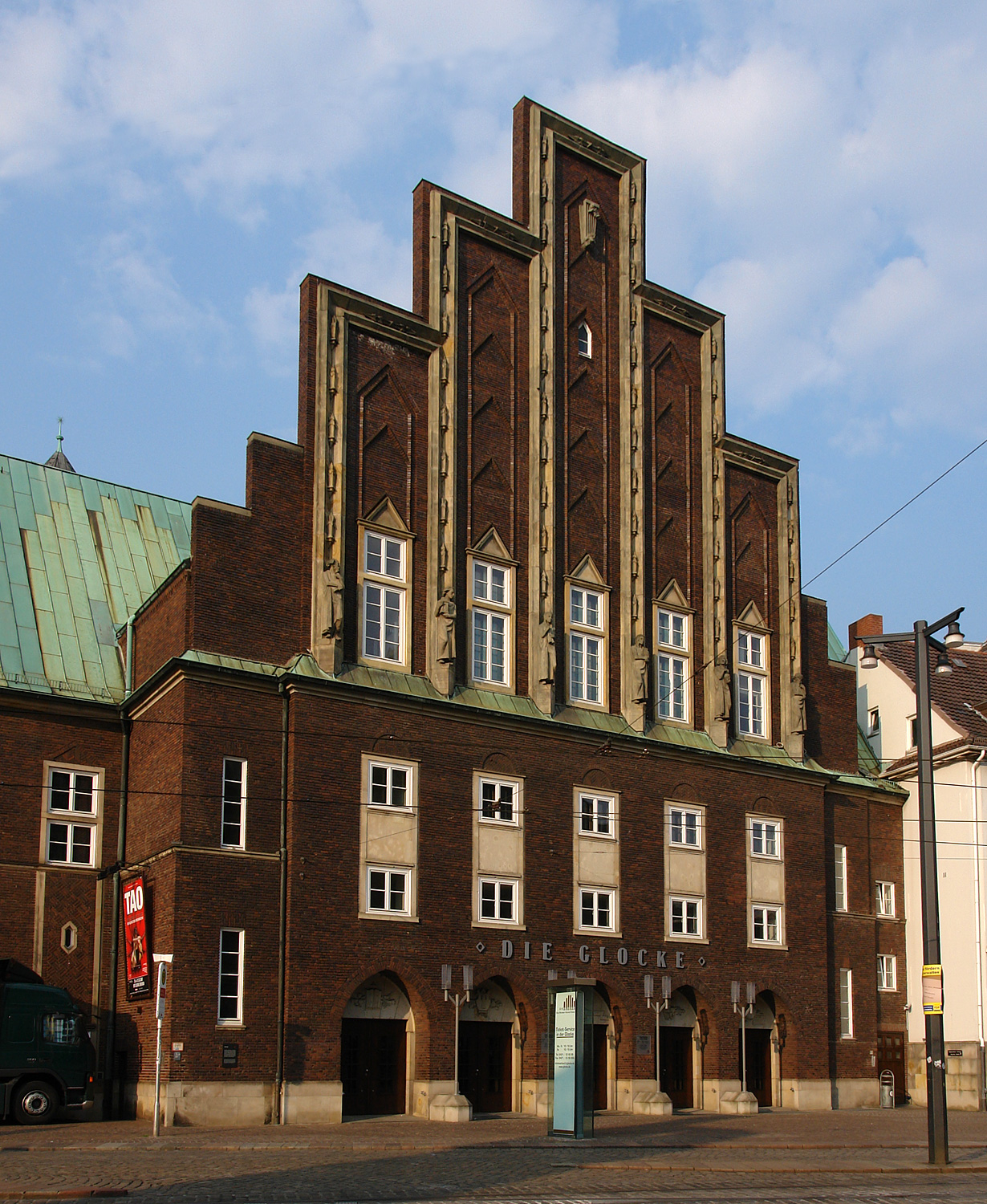
Die Glocke, Bremen, Germany

- Bastei (Köln), Cologne, 1924/1927
- Chilehaus, Hamburg, 1924
- Die Glocke, Bremen, 1928
- Disch-Haus, Cologne, 1930
- Hansahochhaus, Cologne, 1925
- Heilig Kreuz (Holy Cross Church), Ückendorf, Gelsenkirchen, North Rhine-Westphalia, 1927
- Schocken Department Store, Stuttgart, 1926
- Naumannsiedlung (Naumann settlement), Cologne, 1927–1929
- St. Antonius, Castrop-Rauxel-Ickern, North Rhine-Westphalia, 1925
- St. Engelbert (Köln) (Saint Engelbert Church), Cologne, 1932

=== Berlin ===
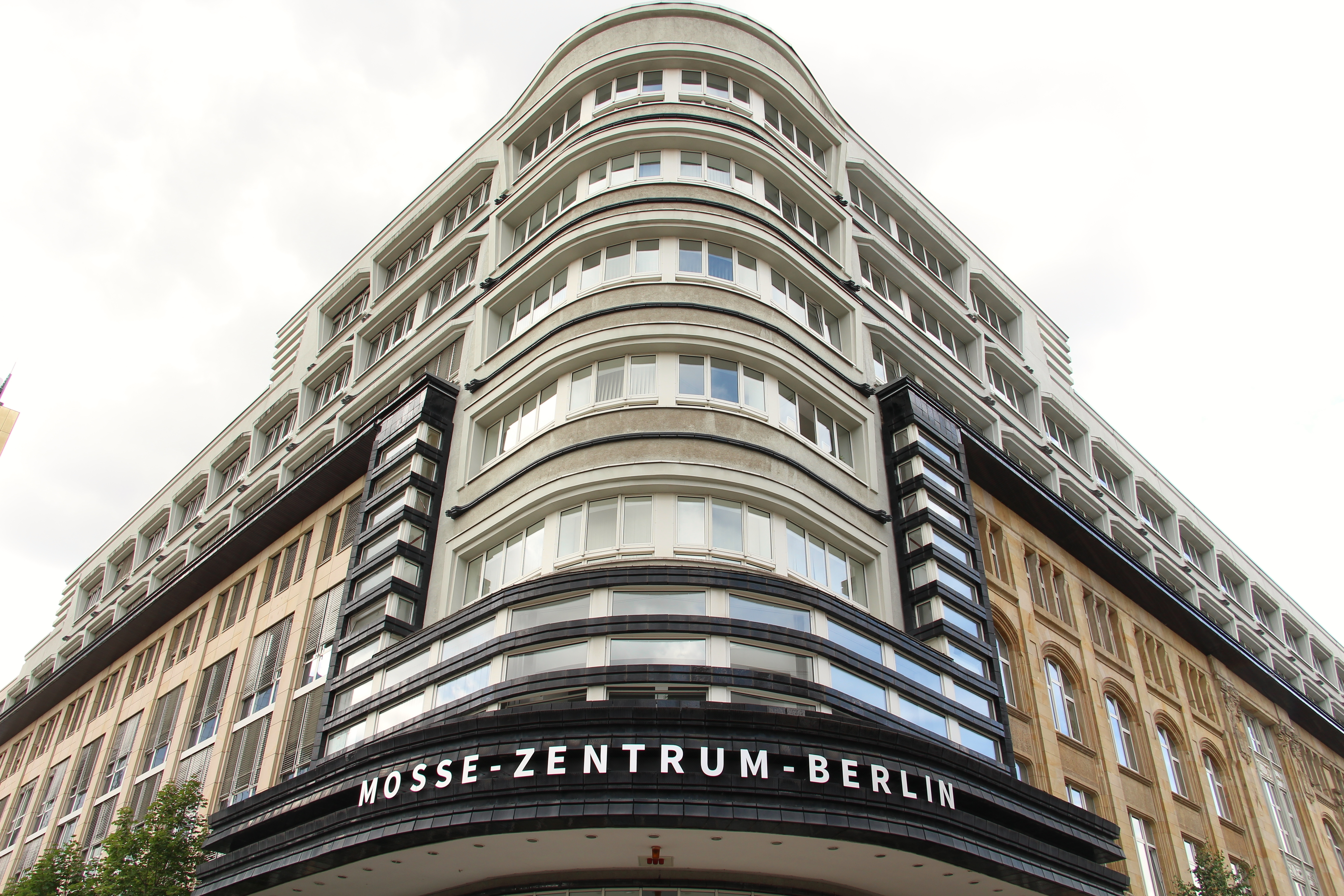
Mosse-Haus, Berlin, Germany

- Astor Film Lounge (formerly Kino im Kindl, KiKi, Pavillon, Film Palast), Berlin, 1948
- Babylon apartments and Babylon Kino, Berlin, 1929
- Berliner Kabarett-Theater, Berlin, 1930, 1934, 1937
- Columbia Theatre, Berlin, 1951
- Huthmacher-Haus, Berlin, 1957
- Kirche am Hohenzollernplatz (Church), Berlin, 1934
- Kreuzkirche Berlin-Schmargendorf, Berlin, 1929
- Maison de France, Cinema Paris, Berlin, 1950
- Metropol Berlin Nollendorfplatz, Berlin, 1906, 1930
- Mossehaus, Berlin, 1923
- Olympiastadion, Berlin, 1936
- Poststadion, Berlin, 1929
- Renaissance Theatre, Berlin
- Schaubuhne am Lehniner Platz (formerly Universum Kino, Luxor Palast, Halensee Palast, Capitol Kino), Berlin, 1928
- Zoo Palast (formerly Bikini, UCI Kinowelt Zoo Palast), Berlin, 1957

== Greece ==
- 17 Dionysiou Areopagitou Street Apartments, Athens, 1930
- 55 Vasilissis Sofias Street, Athens, 1928
- Aquarium of Rhodes, Rhodes, 1937
- Athens University of Economics and Business, Athens, 1926
- Bank of Greece Building, Althens, 1933–1938
- Cinema, Lakki, Leros, 1938
- City Link/Attica commercial centre, Athens
- Egnatia Palace Hotel, Thessaloniki
- Ethniko Kotopouli-Rex, Athens, 1937
- General Accounting Office of Greece, Athens, 1928
- Megaron Seilon apartments, Athens, 1935
- The Modernist Hotel, Thessaloniki, 1920s
- New Agora (New Market), Mandraki, Rhodes, 1923
- Pallas Cinema & Theatre Hall, Athens, 1927, 1940
- Papaleonardou Apartments, Athens, 1925
- Rex Theatre (Athens)|Rex Theatre, Athens
- Synagogue, Kos, 1934

== Hungary ==
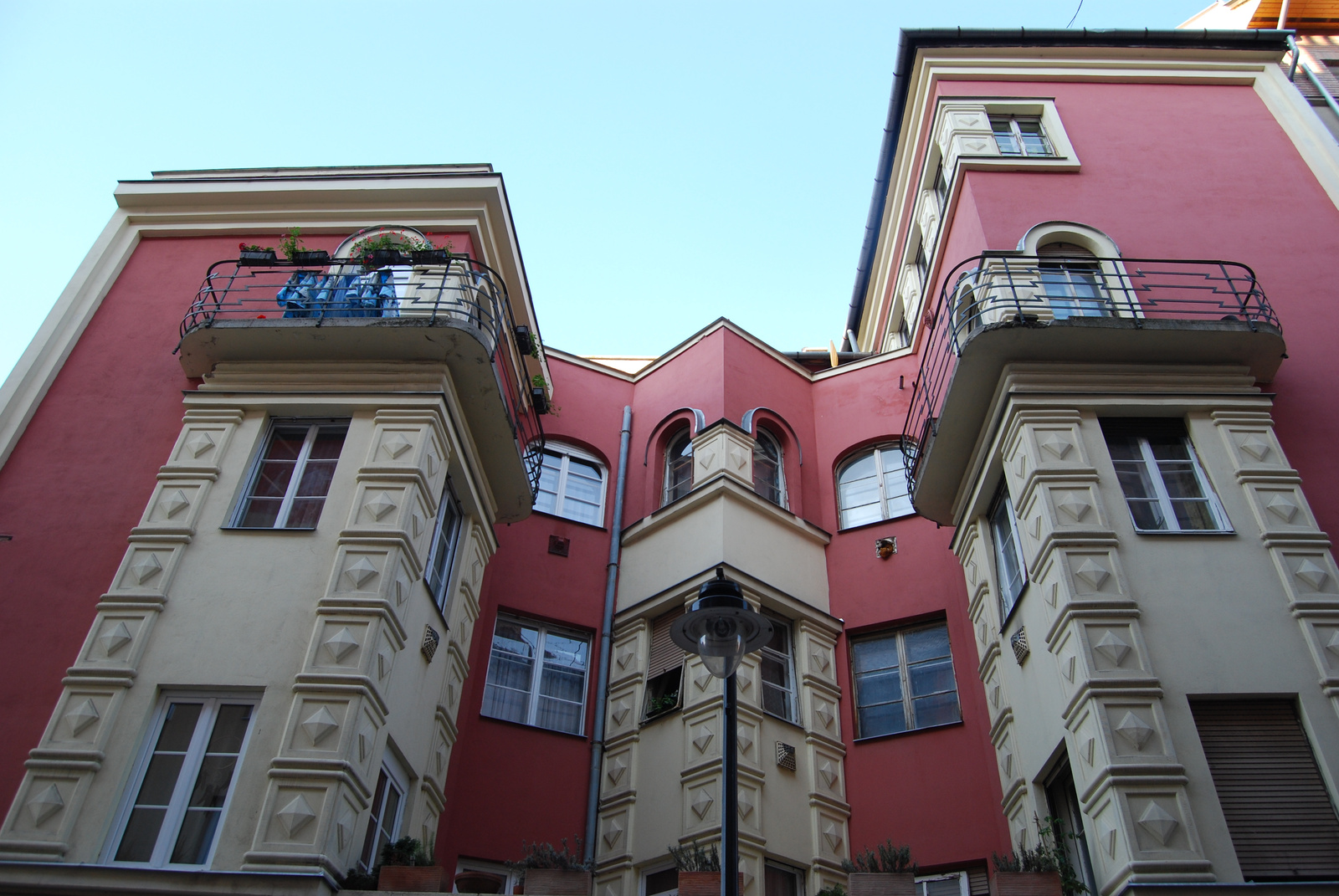
Apartment building, Budapest, Hungary

- 3 Futó Street, Budapest, 1930
- 46 Dohány Street, Budapest, 1929
- Átrium Film Theatre, Budapest, 1935
- Hősök mauzóleuma (Mausoleum of Heroes), Debrecen, 1932
- Jánossy Képtár Gallery, Balassagyarmat, 1913
- Madách Square buildings, Budapest, 1938
- Markó utcai Elektromos Művek (Markó Street Electric Works building), Budapest, 1932
- Népszínház Street 37, Budapest, 1912
- Post Office, Kossuth Street, Cegléd, 1929
- A margitszigeti Sportuszoda (Sportshall of Margaret Island), Budapest, 1931

== Iceland ==
- Akureyrarkirkja, Akureyri, 1940
- Hallgrímskirkja, Reykjavik, 1945
- Hotel Borg, Reykjavik
- National Theatre of Iceland (Þjóðleikhúsið), Reykjavik, 1950
- Sundhöllin, Reykjavík, 1937

== Ireland ==
- The Art Deco Theatre Ballymote, Rathnakelliga, Sligo
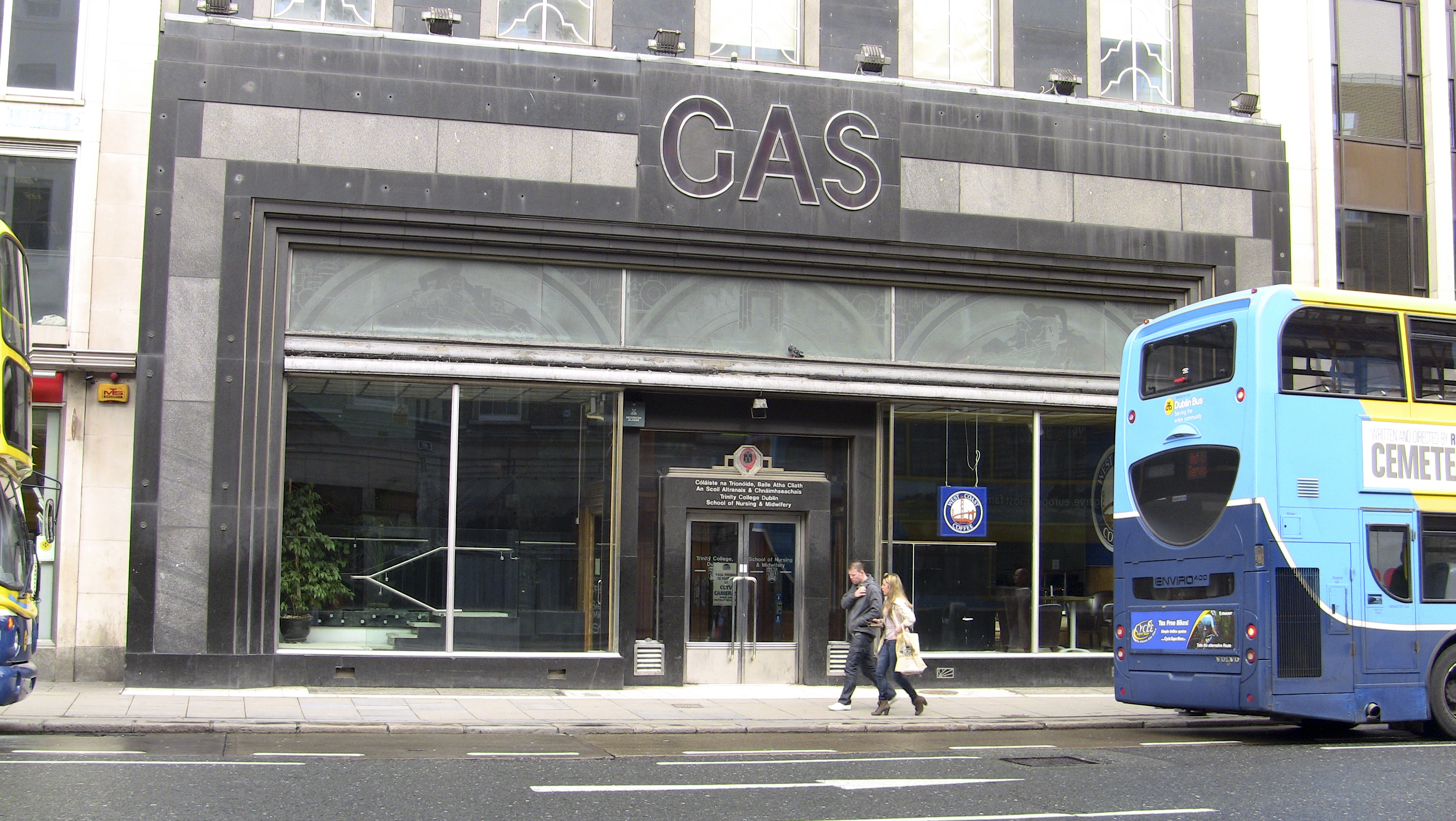
- Dublin Gas Company Building on Dublin's D'Olier Street
  Bank of Ireland Building, Belfast
- Bull Wall public bath shelters, Dublin
- Camden De Luxe (now the Palace club), Dublin
- Chancery House, Dublin, 1930–1940
- Church of Christ the King, Turner's Cross, Cork (city)
- Countess Markiewvicz House, Dublin, 1939
- Dara Cinema (formerly Coliseum Cinema), Naas, 1940
- Department of Enterprise, Tourism and Employment, Dublin, 1939
- Dublin Airport, Dublin, 1939, 1950
- Dublin Institute of Technology, School of Culinary Arts and Food Technology, Cathal Brugha Street, Dublin, 1939
- Forum Theatre (formerly the Regal), Waterford, 1937
- Gas Building (now the School of Nursing and Midwifery Studies, Trinity College), Dublin, 1818, 1934
- Inchicore Public Library, Inchicore, Dublin, 1937
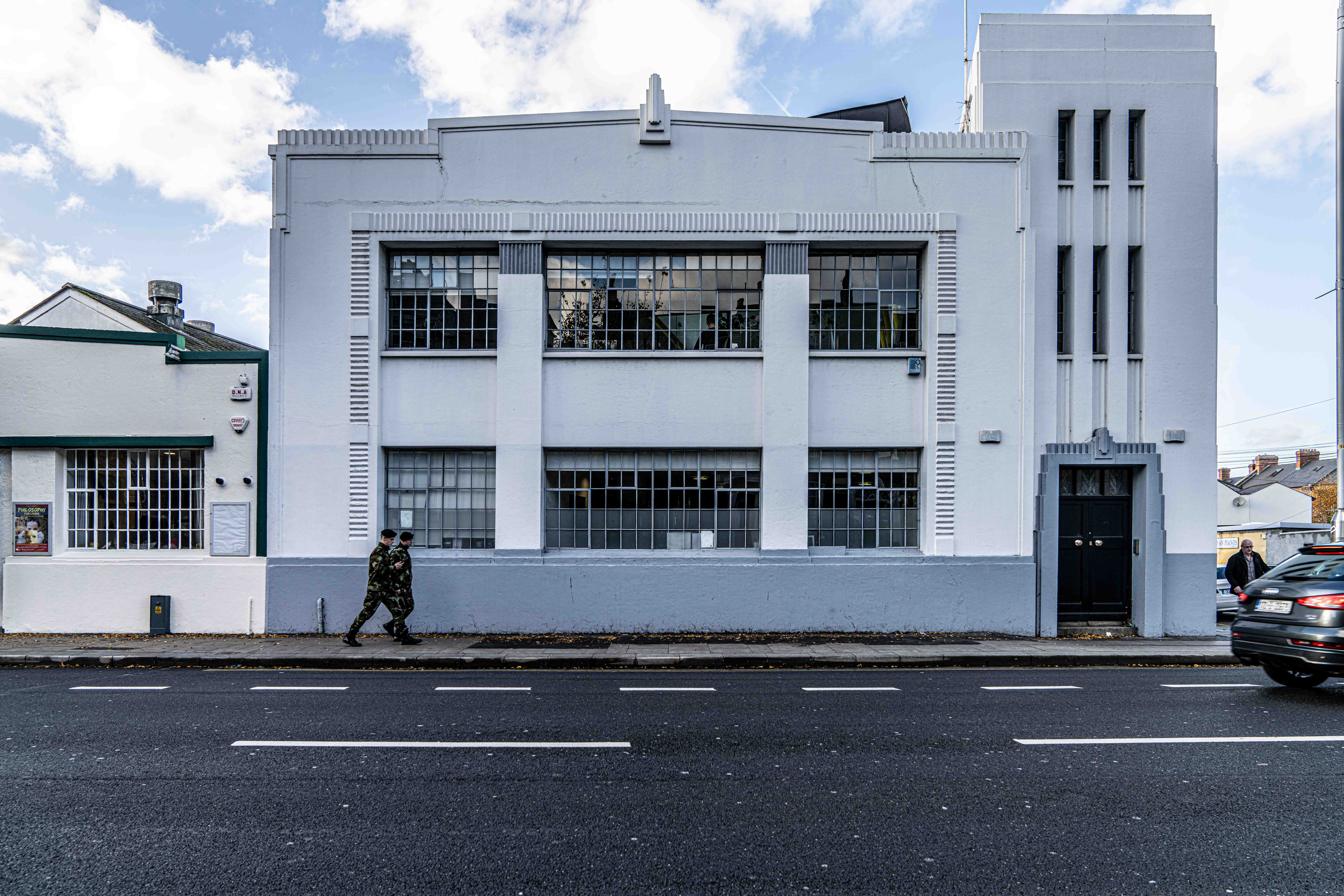
- Kodak House, Rathmines, Dublin
  Irish Wire Products Limited (IWP) Factory, Limerick, 1930s
- Kodak House, Rathmines, Dublin, 1930
- Leisureplex bowling alley, Dublin
- Liberty House, Dublin, 1936
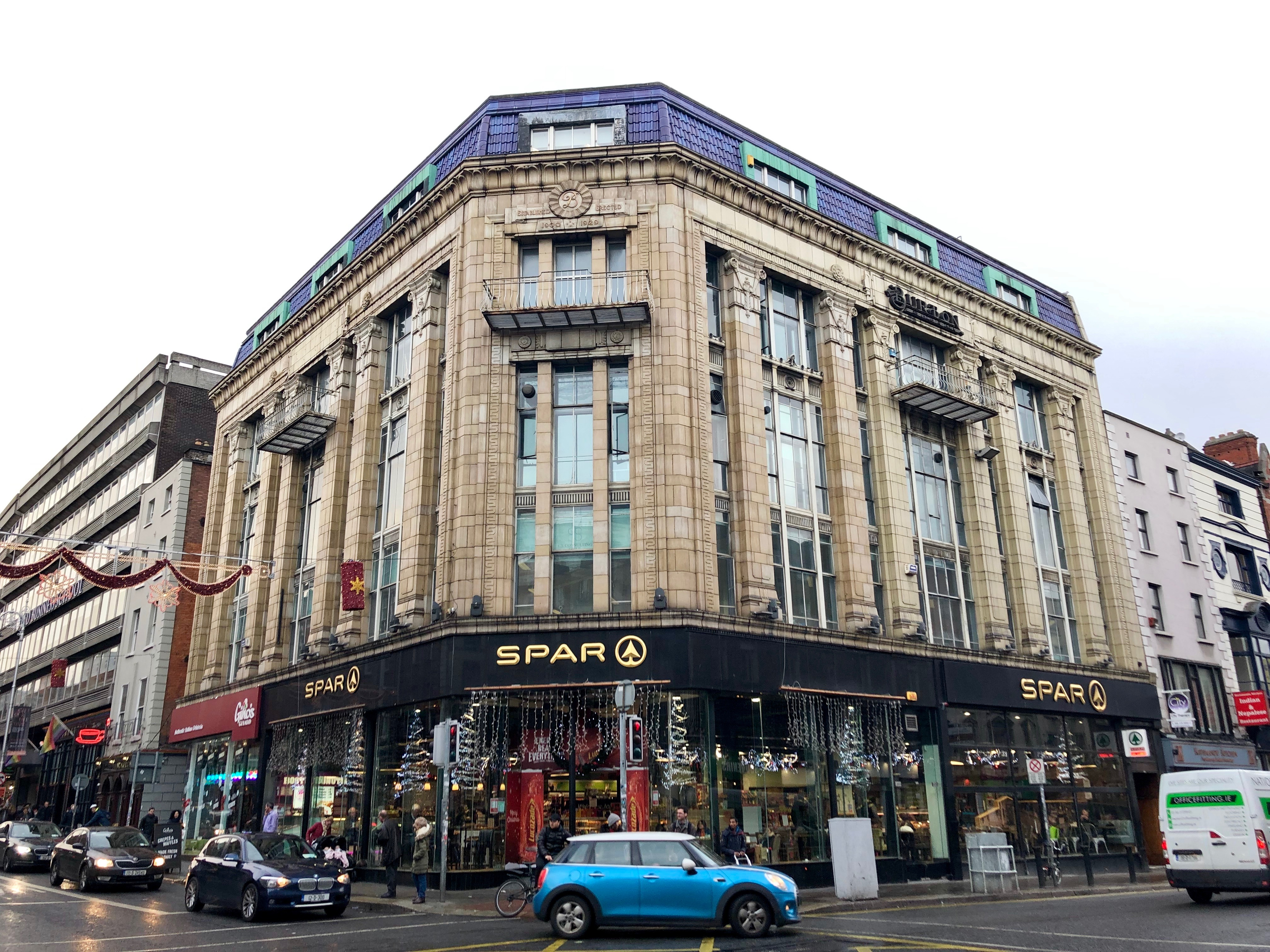
- Montague Burton Building, Dublin, Ireland
  Montague Burton Building, Dublin, 1930
- National Library of Ireland administration building, Dublin, 1936
- Pearse House Flats, Dublin, 1933
- Phoenix Cinema, Dingle
- Refuge Assurance Building, Ballinasloe, County Galway, 1935
- The Savoy Theatre (now the Book Centre), Waterford, 1930s
- School of Culinary Arts and Food Technology, Dublin Institute of Technology, Dublin, 1941
- Stella Theatre, Rathmines, Dublin, 1923
- Theatre Royal (the fifth), Dublin, 1935
- Tivoli Theatre, Dublin, 1934
- Watergate Theatre (formerly the Savoy), Kilkenny, 1937

== Italy ==
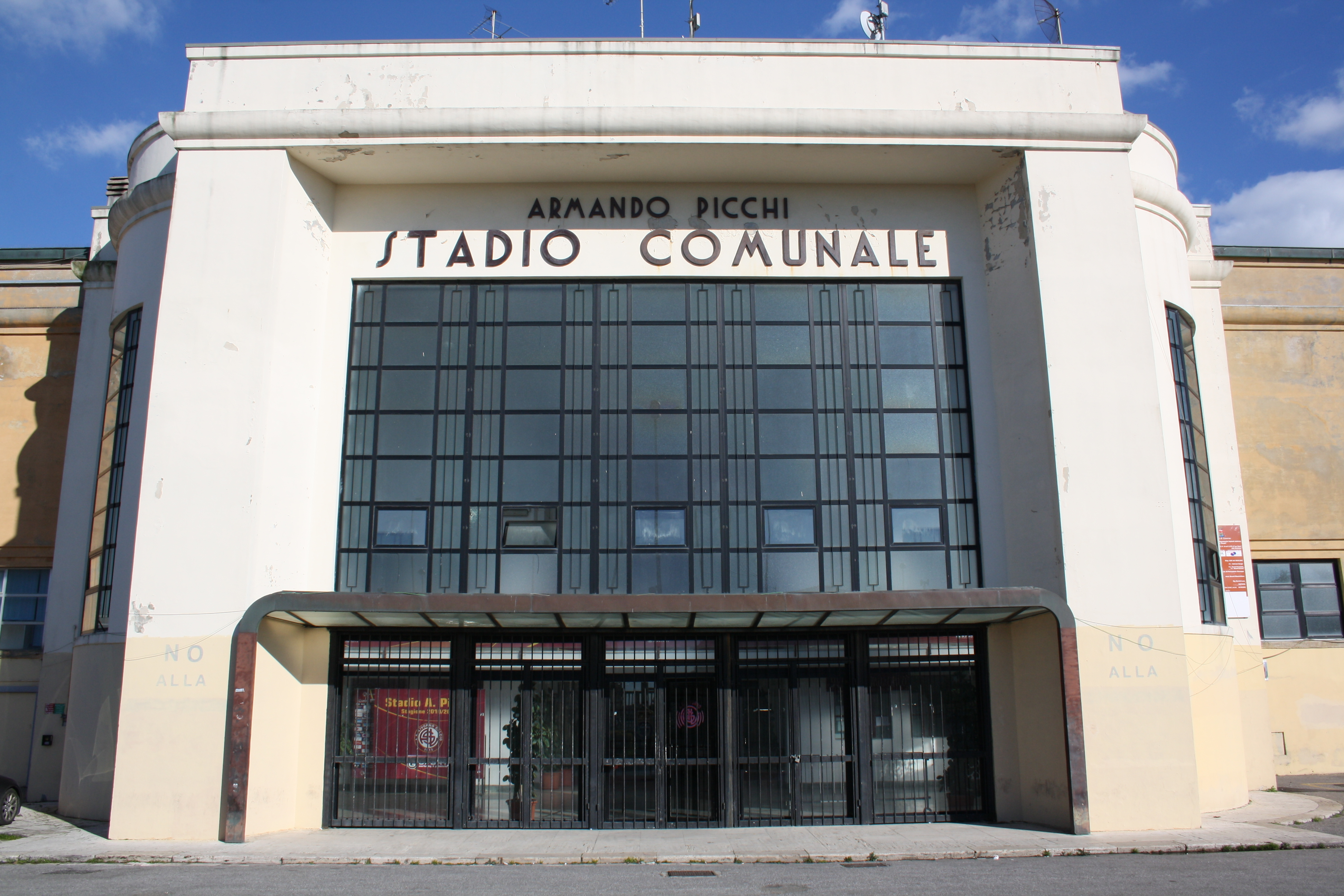
Stadio Armando Picchi, Livorno, Italy

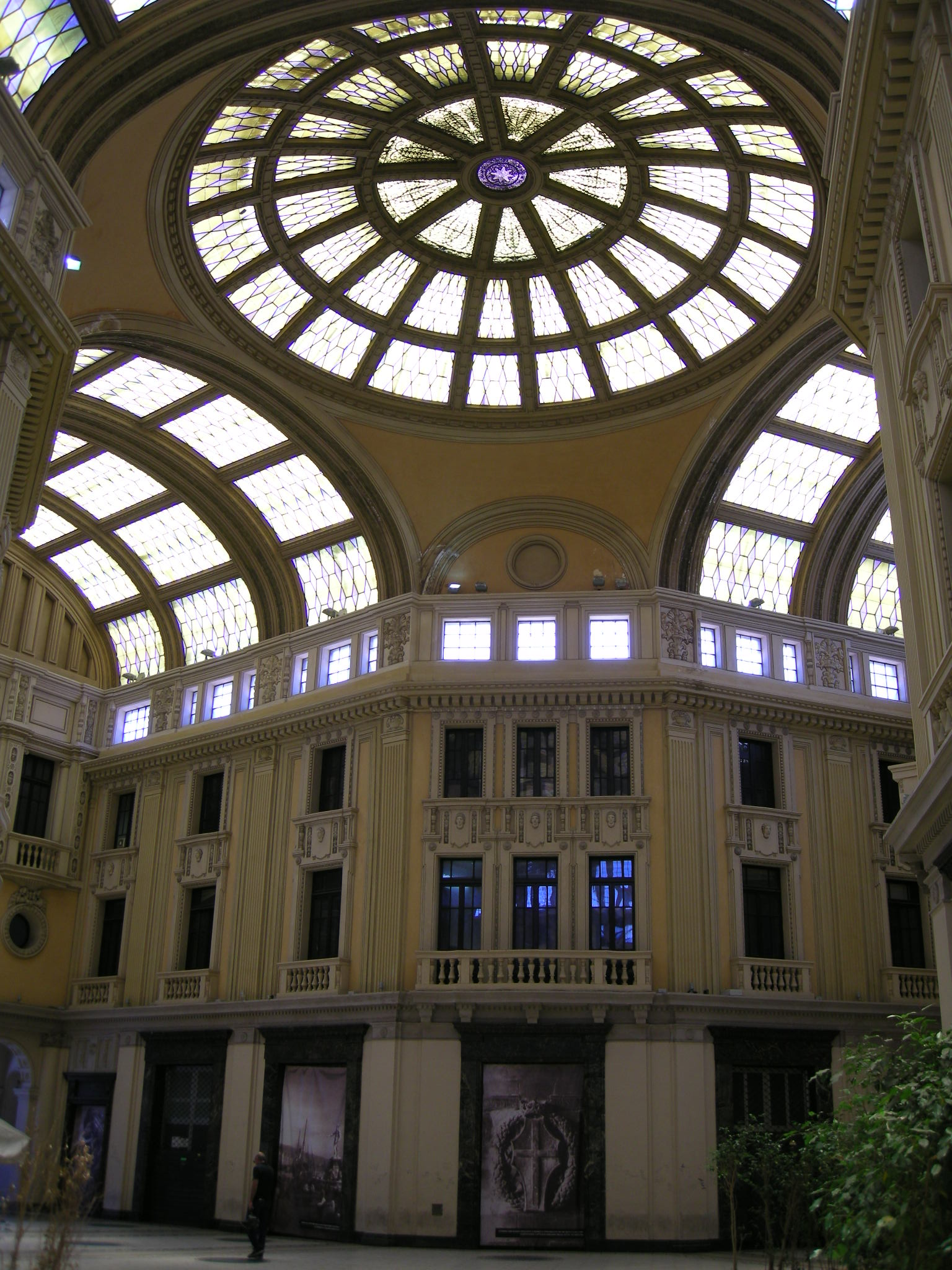
Galleria Vittorio Emanuele III, Messina, Italy

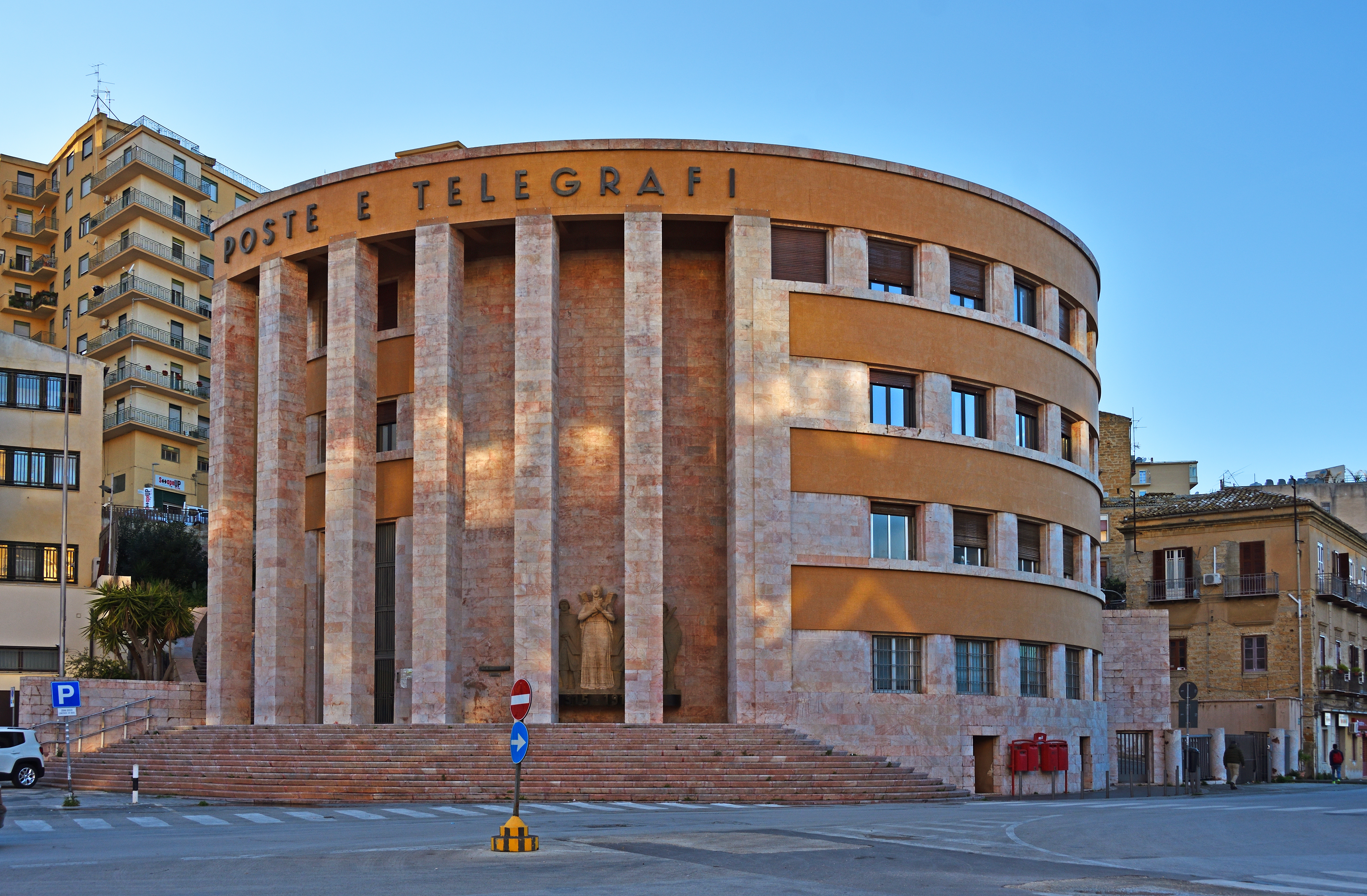
Central Post office, Agrigento, Sicily, Italy

- Albergo diurno Cobianchi, Milan, 1924
- Albergo diurno Venezia, Venice, 1926
- Bettoja Hotel Mediterraneo, Rome, 1936
- Casa-museo Boschi Di Stefano (House and museum), Milan, 1931
- Casa del passeggero (CASPAS), Rome, 1917
- Casa Savona, Palermo, Sicily, 1920
- Central Post office, Agrigento, Sicily, 1932-1936
- Cinema Teatro Odeon, Canicattì, Sicily, 1952
- La centrale idroelettrica di Crevola (hydroelectric plant), Crevoladossola, 1925
- Edicola Radice (shrine) in the cemetery of Busto Arsizio, 1919
- Giacomo Arengario restaurant, Museo del Novecento, Milan
- Palazzo dell'Upim department store, Genoa, 1928
- Galleria Vittorio Emanuele III, Messina, Sicily, 1924-1929
- Palazzo del Banco di Sicilia (via Roma) in Palermo, Sicily, 1935
- Palazzo delle Terme Berzieri palazzo, Salsomaggiore Terme, Parma, 1914–1929
- Quartiere Coppedè (Coppedè district), Trieste, Rome, 1915–1927
- Sala della Cheli, Vittoriale degli Italiani, Gardone Riviera, Lombardy, 1921–1938
- Stadio Armando Picchi, Livorno, 1935
- Stadio Artemio Franchi, Florence, 1931
- Stadio dei Marmi, Rome, 1928
- Stadio Renato Dall'Ara, Bologna, 1927
- Milano Centrale railway station, Milano, 1931
- Teatro Finocchiaro, Palermo, Sicily, 1922
- Odeon theater, Milan, 1929
- Teatro Odeon, Catania, Sicily, 1931
- Teatro Metropolitan, Catania, Sicily, 1955
- Torrione INA, Brescia, 1932
- Villa Grock, Imperia, 1927
- Villa Necchi Campiglio, Milan, 1935

== Latvia ==
- Laima Clock, Riga, 1924
- Riga Central Market, Riga, 1930
- Riga City Vidzemes Civil Registry Office, Riga, 1936

== Lithuania ==
Some of the notable Art Deco buildings include:

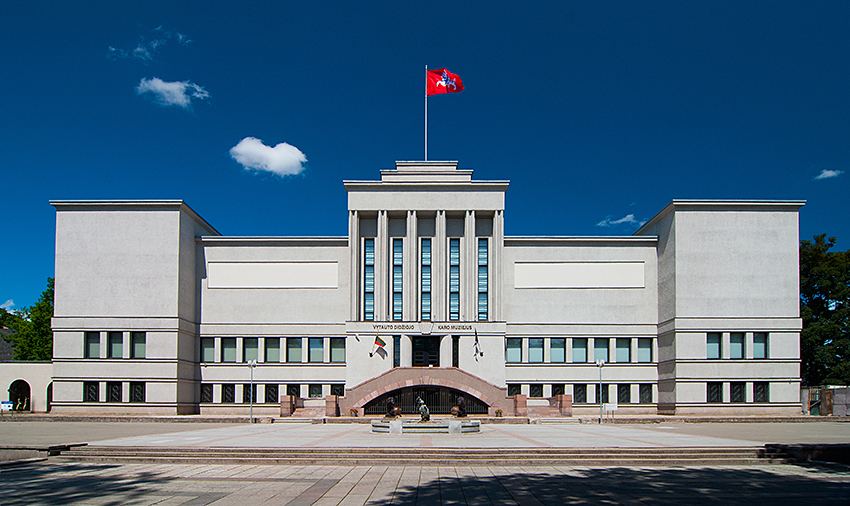
Vytautas the Great War Museum, Kaunas, Lithuania

- Aleksotas Funicular Railway, Kaunas, 1935
- Bank of Lithuania Building, Vilnius, 1939
- Central Post Office (Feliksas Vizbaras), Kaunas, 1932
- Chamber of Commerce, Industry, and Crafts (Vytautas Landsbergis-Žemkalnis), Kaunas, 1938
- Church of the Resurrection, Kaunas, 1941, 2006
- Daina Movie Theatre, Kaunas, 1938
- Firemen's Hall (Edmundas Alfonsas Frykas), Kaunas, 1930
- The Headquarters of the Milk Processing Company Pienocentras, Kaunas, 1934
- Kaunas Garrison Officers' Club Building (Stasys Kudokas), Kaunas
- Kaunas Municipality building (formerly Savings Bank), Kaunas, 1940
- Kaunas Sports Hall (Anatol Rozenblum), Kaunas, 1939
- Kriščiukaitis (Jonas Kova-Kovalskis,) 1937
- M. K. Čiurlionis National Museum of Art, Kaunas, 1921
- Our Lord Jesus Christ's Resurrection Basilica, Kaunas, 1940, 2004
- The Pažanga Company, Kaunas, 1934
- Romuva Cinema, Kaunas
- St. Vincent de Paul Elderly People’s Home, Kaunas, 1940
- State Philharmonic Hall, Kaunas (Edmundas Alfonsas Frykas, 1929), neoclassical style building with bright Art Deco architectural elements
- Vytautas the Great War Museum and M. K. Čiurlionis National Art Museum palace, Kaunas (Vladimir Dubenecki, 1936)

== Luxembourg ==
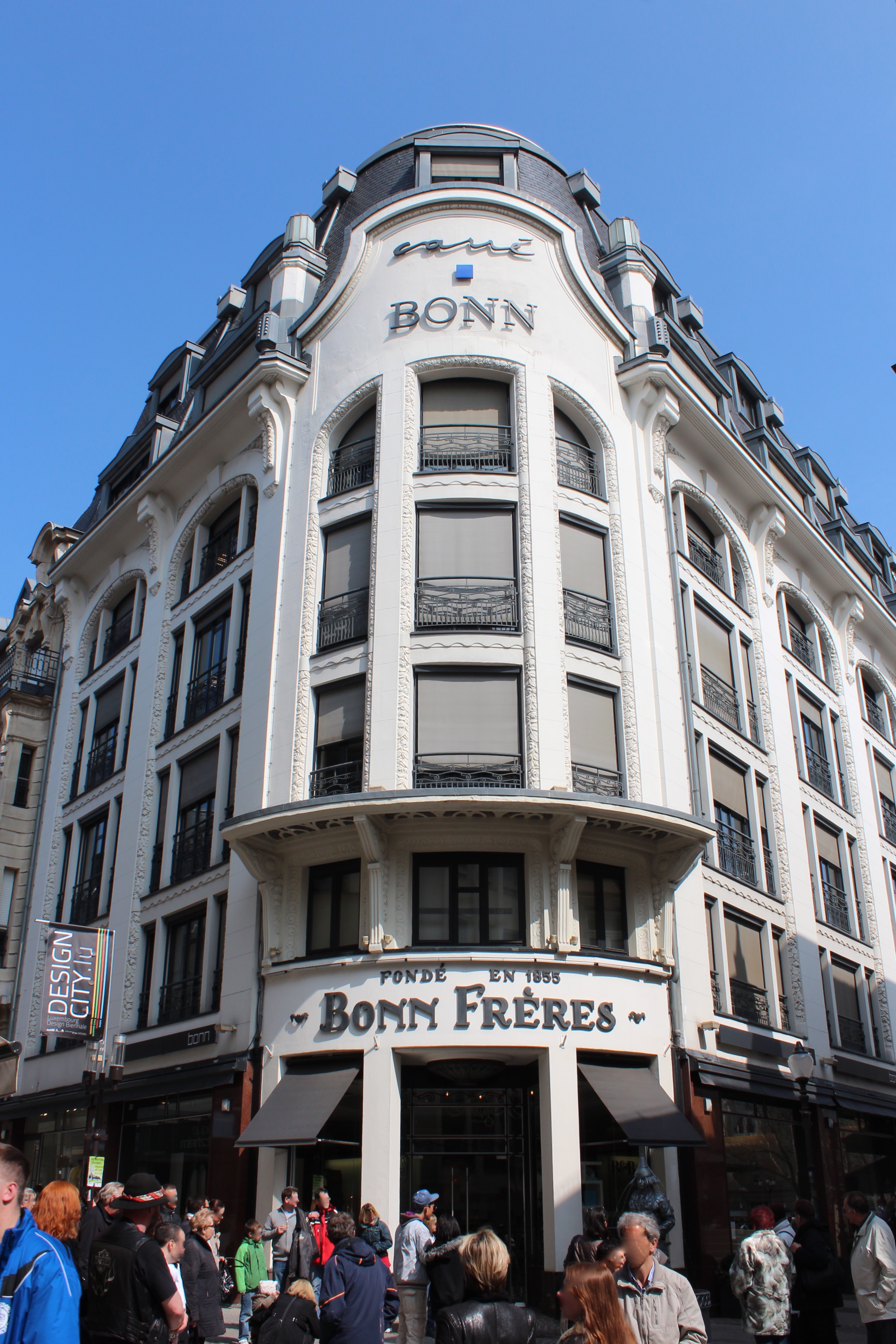
Palais du Meuble Bonn Frères, Luxembourg City, Luxembourg

- À la Bourse clothing store, Luxembourg City, 1934
- Chapelle du Christ-Roi, Luxembourg City, 1932
- Fielmann Building, Luxembourg City
- Grenzerkierch (Church of the Sacred Heart), Esch-Uelzecht, 1932
- Hotel Alfa, Luxembourg City, 1930
- Former Hotel du Parc, Esch-sur-Alzette, 1930
- Kino Rex (former cinema), Esch-Uelzecht, 1938
- Lycée Guillaume Kroll, Esch-Uelzecht, 1937
- Palais du Mobilier Bonn Frères (furniture store), Luxembourg City, 1926
- Victor-Hugo-Plaz technical school, Lycée Guillaume Kroll, Esch-Uelzecht, 1936
- Villa Heldenstein, Luxembourg City, 1927

== Malta ==
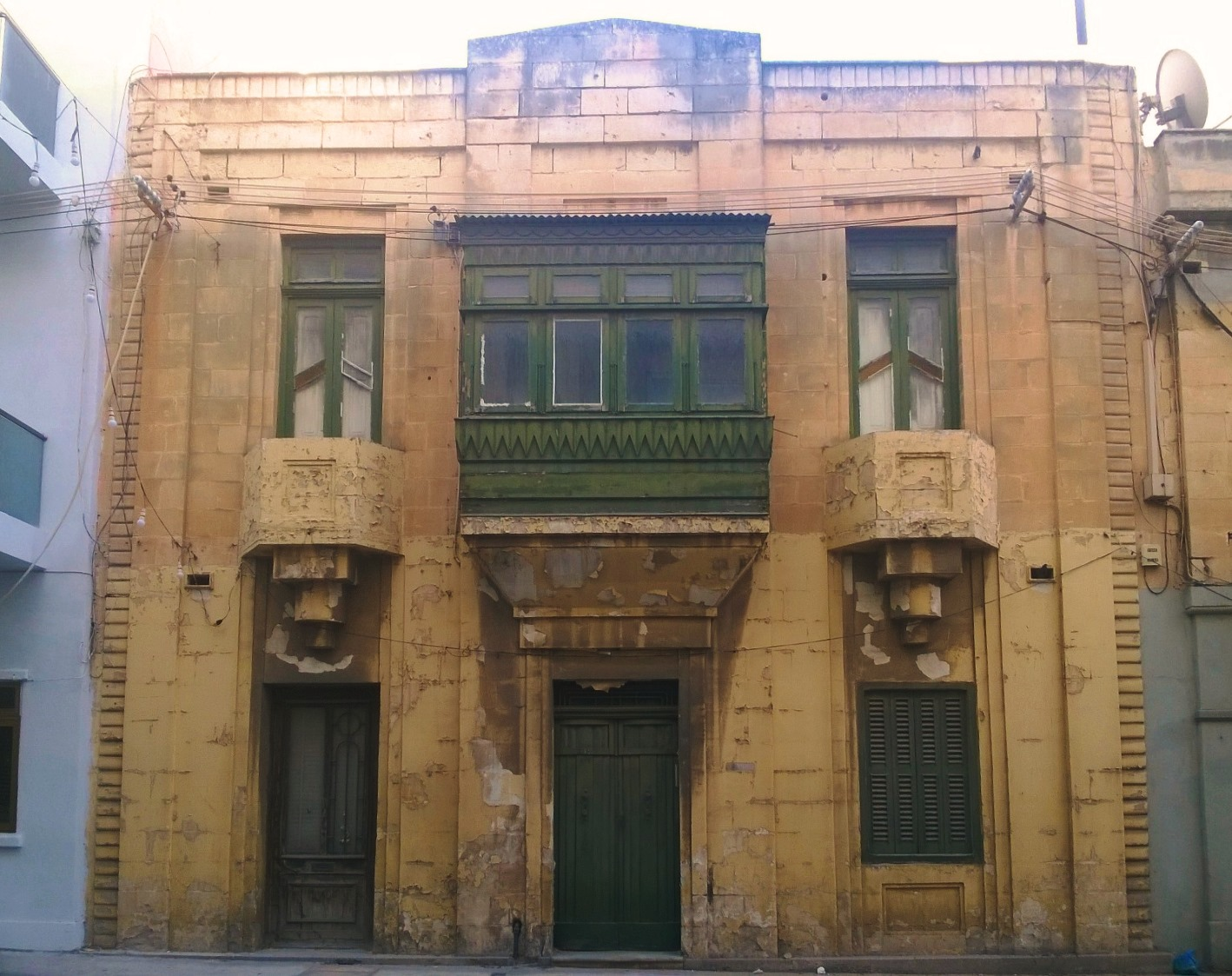
Private residence of Joseph Columbo, Gżira, Malta

- Blue Arena theatre, Żabbar, 1950s
- former Gżira government primary school, Gżira, 1930s
- Hotel Phoenicia, Floriana, 1930s, 1947
- former HSBC Bank (formerly Rialto Cinema), Bormla
- Lombard Bank, Sliema
- Muscats Motors, Gżira, 1945
- Palazzina Vincenti, St. Julian's, 1948
- Plaza Cinema, Zurrieq, mid-1930s
- Private residence of Joseph Colombo in Triq d'Argens, Gżira, 1936
- former Royal Cinema, Victoria, Gozo
- Titan International Limited building (formerly Lyric Theatre), Msida, 1930s

== Monaco ==
- 18 Boulevarde de Suisse, Monaco
- The Victoria building, Monaco

== Montenegro ==
- Podgorica Main Post Office, Podgorica

== Netherlands ==
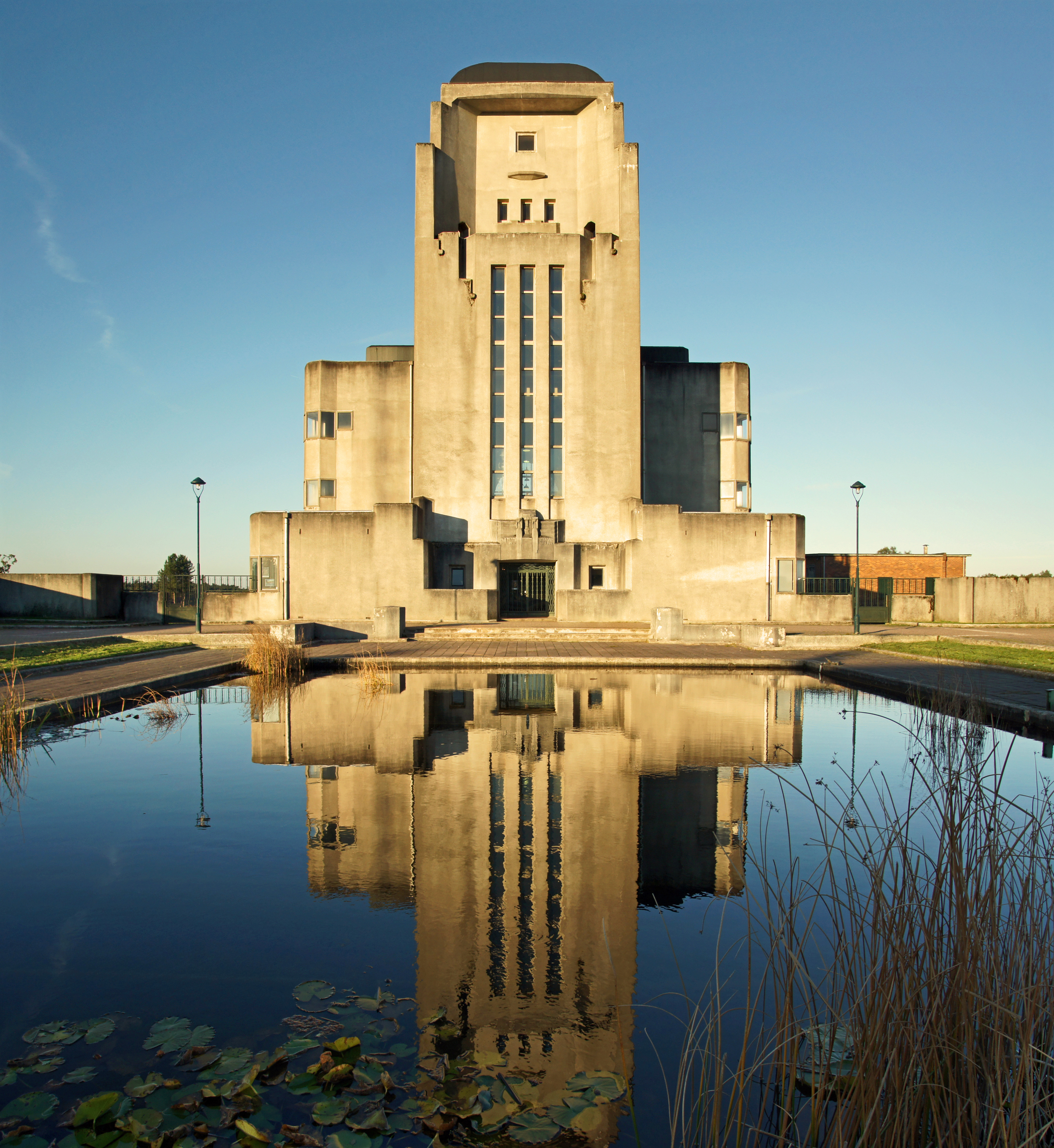
Radio Kootwijk, Building A, Apeldorn, Netherlands

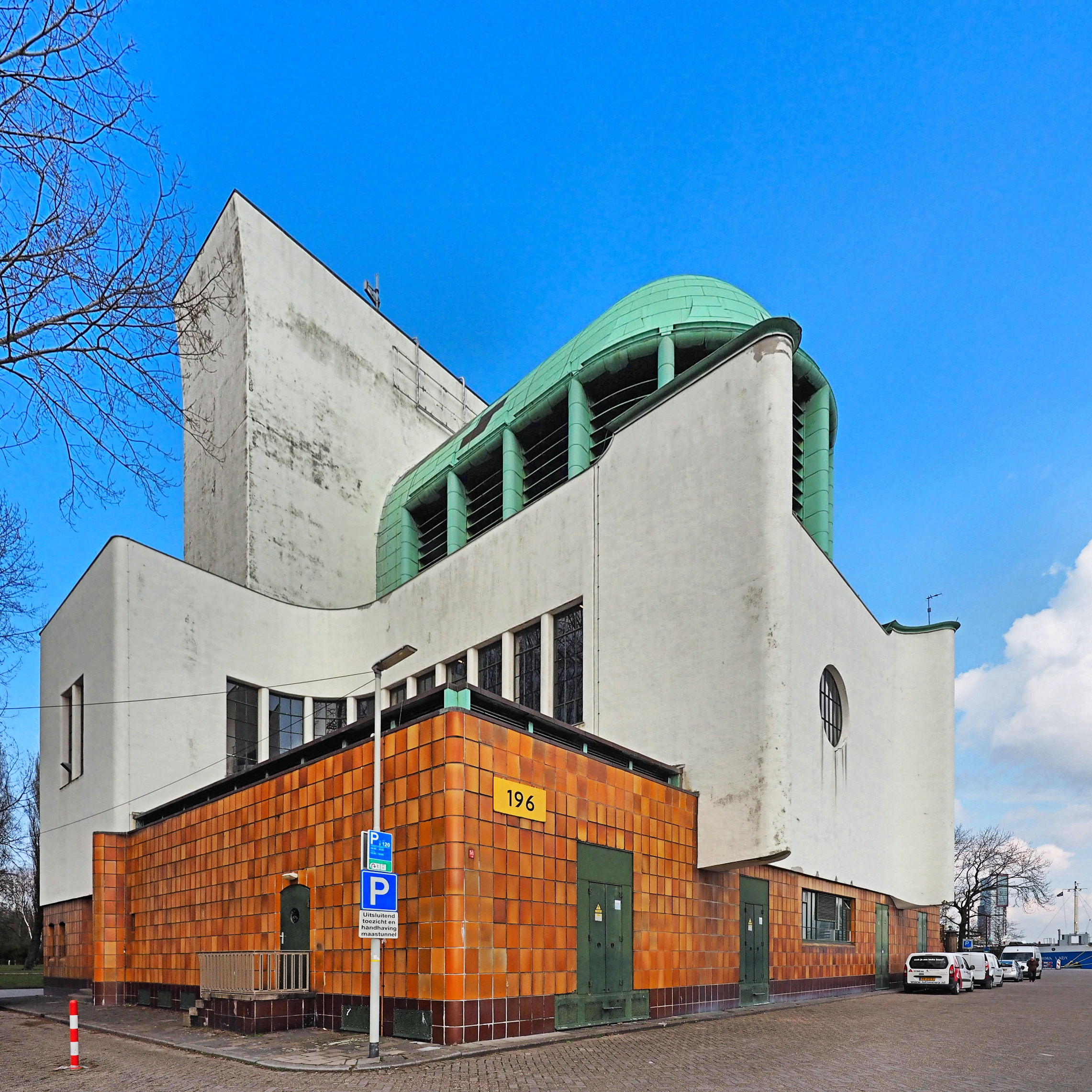
Ventilation tower of the Maastunnel, Rotterdam, Netherlands

- Atlantic Huis, Rotterdam, 1930
- De Baarsjes neighbourhood, Amsterdam
- City Theater, Amsterdam, 1935
- De Dageraad apartments, Amsterdam-Zuid, 1920
- Concertgebouw de Vereeniging, Nijmegen, 1914
- Harlingen Lighthouse, Harlingen, Friesland, 1922
- Kraajiveld House, Rotterdam, 1938
- Minnervahuis, Rotterdam, 1937
- De Nieuwe Badkapel church, Scheveningen, 1916
- Nieuwe Synagoge (New Synagogue), Nijmegen, 1913
- Pathe City (formerly City Theater), Amsterdam, 1935
- Plein 26, Mauritshuis Museum, The Hague, 1930
- Prins Hendrik Barracks (former barracks), Nijmegen, 1911
- Radio Kootwijk, Apeldoorn, 1922
- Scheepvaarthuis, Amsterdam, 1916, 1928
- Tuschinsky Theater, Amsterdam, 1921
- Ventilation tower of the Maastunnel, Rotterdam, 1937
- Vleeschhouwerij, Weesp
- Wilhelminapark 63 and 53a, Tilburg, 1914

== Norway ==
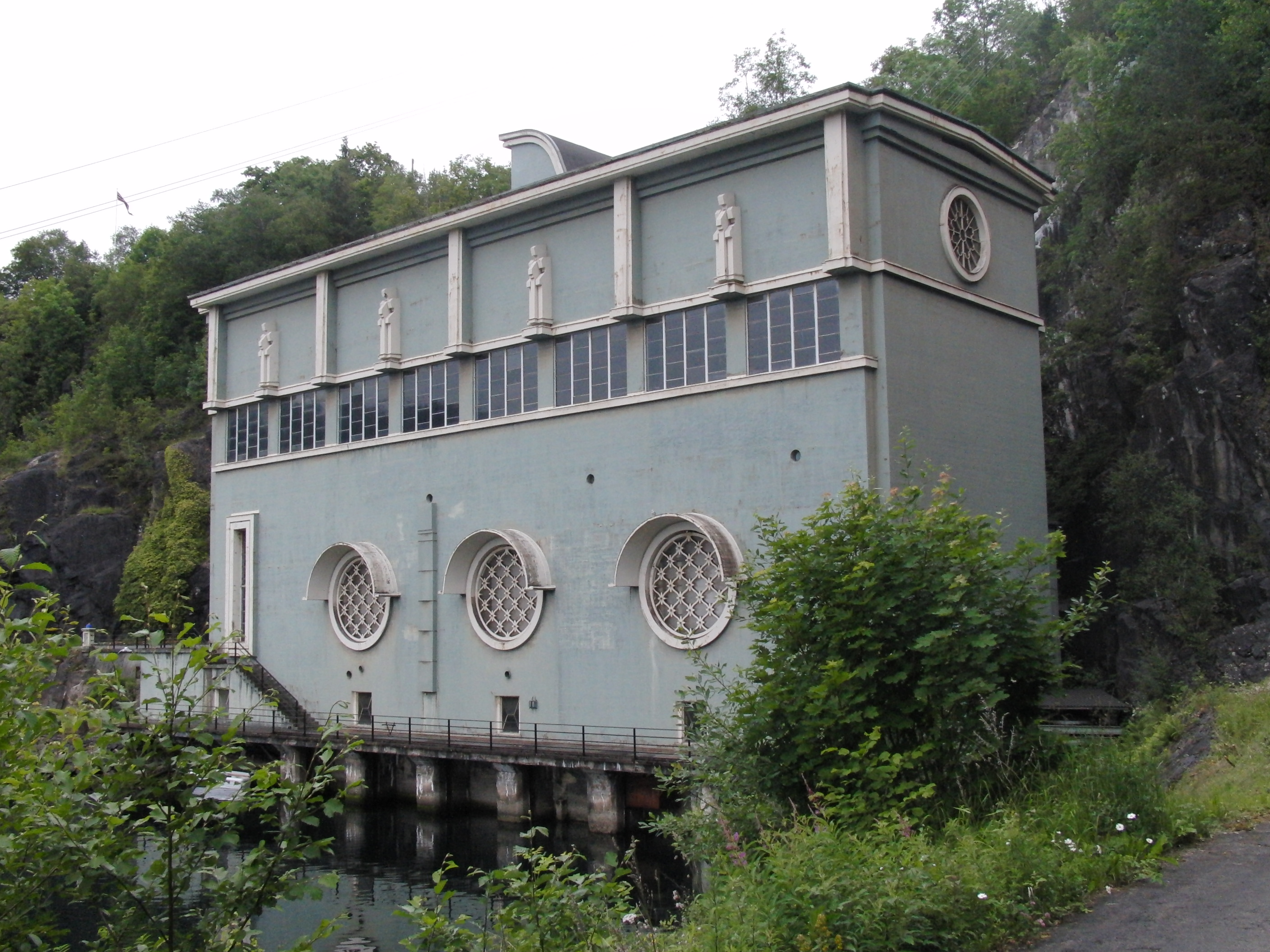
Sauda III hydroelectric station, Sauda, Norway

- Arbeiderpartibygningen (Labor Party headquarters), Oslo, 1929–1935
- Folketeateret, Oslo, 1935
- Folkets Hus cultural center, Tofte, 1930
- Forum Kino, Bergen, 1936
- Oslo Rådhus (City Hall), Oslo, 1931-1950
- Sauda III hydroelectric power station, Sauda, Rogaland, 1930
- Steen & Strøm, Kongens gate No. 23, department store, Oslo, 1930
- Studentersamfundet i Trondhjem, Trondheim, 1927

== Poland ==
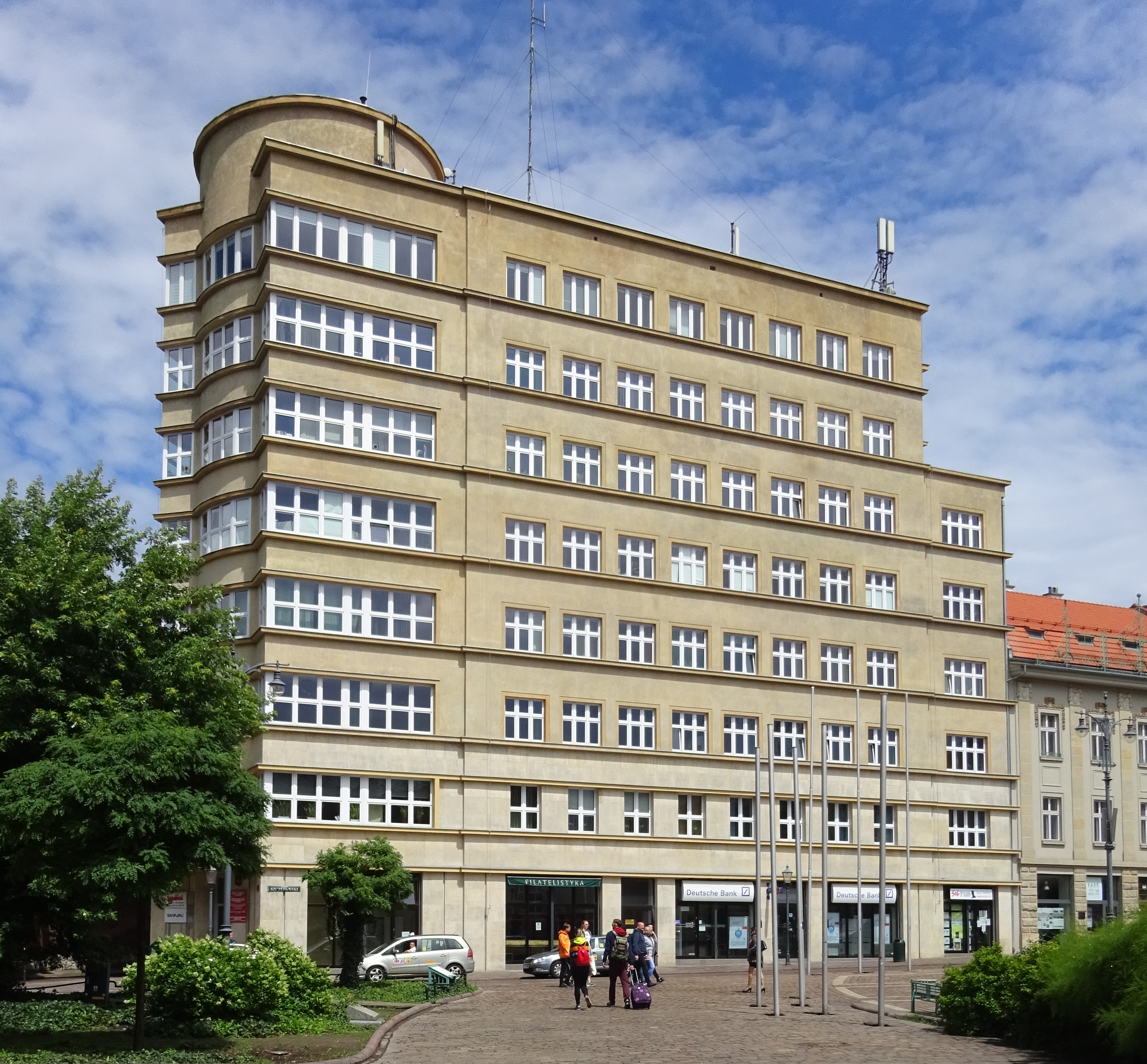
Municipal Savings Bank (Budynek Komunalnej Kasy Oszczędnościowej), Kraków, Poland

- Dom mieszkalny profesorów Uniwersytetu Jagiellońskiego (Professors' House), Jagiellonian University, Kraków, 1931
- Dom Centralny (Central House), Zamość, 1911
- Diaknostyka (Diagnostics and Medical Laboratories), Cieszyn
- Gdynia City Hall (formerly ZUS Building), Gdynia, 1936
- Higher School of Health Promotion recruitment center (Krakowska Wyższa Szkoła Promocji Zdrowia Rekrutacja), Krakow
- HSW Building (Huta Stalowa Wola), Stalowa Wola, 1938
- Izba rzemieślnicza (Chamber of Crafts organization building), Poznań, 1929
- Jakub Lando's Tenement building, Łódź, 1939
- Jastrzębiec Villa, Zalesie Dolne, 1933
- Lviv Mental Insurance Employee tenement house, Kraków, 1926
- Municipal Savings Bank (Budynek Komunalnej Kasy Oszczędnościowej), Kraków, 1935
- Narrow Gauge Railway Museum (Muzeum Kolei Wąskotorowej w Sochaczewie, former railway station), Sochaczew, 1920s
- Olympic Stadium, Wrocław, 1928
- PAST (Polish Telephone Joint-stock Company), Łódź, 1928
- Petersdorff Department Store, Wrocław, 1928 (in Polish)
- Polish Telephone Joint-stock Company (PAST), Łódź, 1928
- Północna Tram Station, Łódź, 1951
- Renoma Department Store, Wrocław, 1930
- Steelwork General Directorate Building, Stalowa Wola, 1938
- Teatr Muzyczny Capitol, Wrocław, 1930

=== Warsaw ===
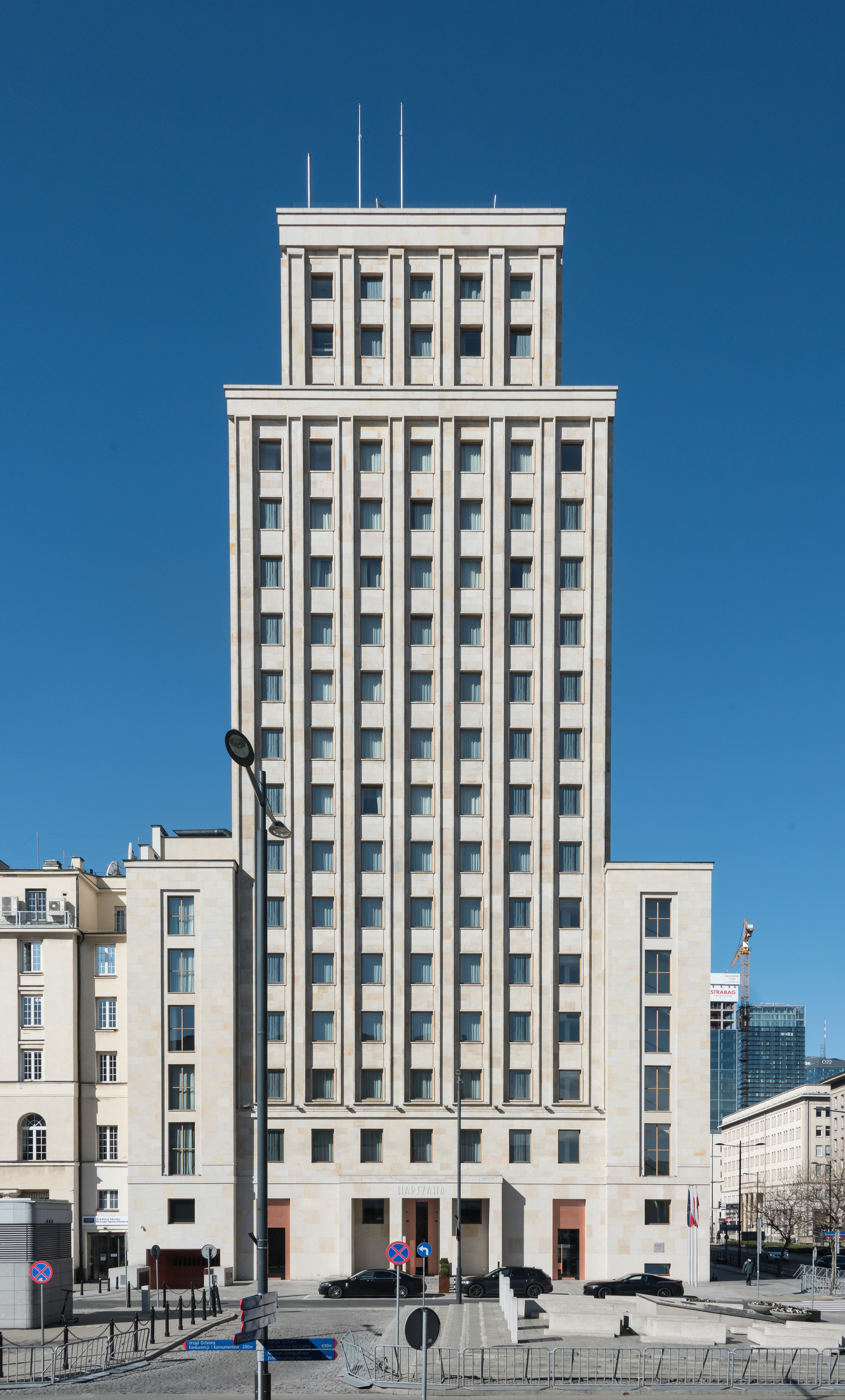
Prudential building, Warsaw, Poland

- Campus of SGH Warsaw School of Economics (Building A and Library), Warsaw, 1925-1931
- 4 Mochnackiego Street, Warsaw
- 43 Grójecka Street (former professors' cooperative housing of the Wolna Wszechnica, Free University), Warsaw
- 78 Wawelska Street, Kolonia Lubeckiego, Warsaw
- A. & M. Orlowscy Tenement House, Warsaw, 1939
- BGK Building and Cafe Cyganeria, Warsaw, 1936–1939
- Franciszka Glasenappowa Tenement House, Warsaw, 1938
- Kazimierz Kolinski Tenement House, Warsaw
- Krenski Company Tenement House, Warsaw, 1939
- Mauzoleum Walki i Męczeństwa (Mausoleum of Struggle and Martyrdom), Warsaw, 1952
- Miastoprojekt office building, Warsaw, 1912
- Ministerstwa Wyznań Religijnych i Oświecenia Publicznego (Polish Ministry of National Education building), Warsaw, 1918
- Muzeum Wodociągów i Kanalizacji, Lindley Filters (Stacji Filtrów) (reliefs by Jan Goliński at the Museum of Water Supply and Sewerage at the Lindley Filter Station), Warsaw
- Ośrodek Studiów Wschodnich (Centre for Eastern Studies), Warsaw
- Prudential building in Warsaw, Warsaw, 1933
- Sejm and Senate Complex, Parliament of Poland, Warsaw, 1928
- Telephone and Telegraph Building (Telefon Miedzymiastowy Telegraf Radiotelegraf), Warsaw
- Trade Union of Local Government Employees (Zwiazek Zaw Pracownikow Samorzadu Terytorialnego), Warsaw
- Warsaw Airport Arrivals Hall, Warsaw, 1934

== Portugal ==
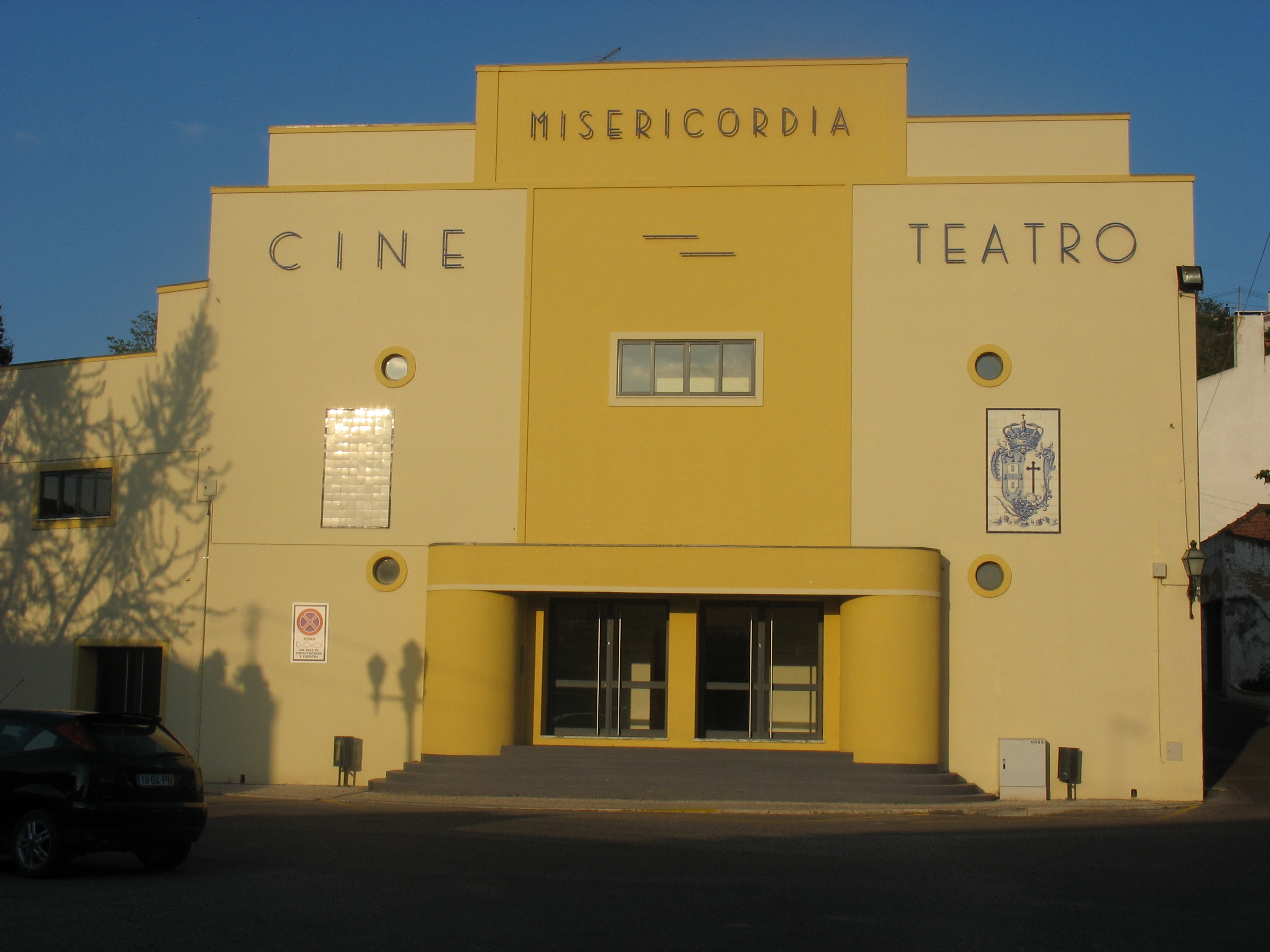
Cine-teatro da Misericórdia, Chamusca, Portugal

- Algarcines de Lagos (formerly the Império Cine), Lagos, Algarve, 1930s
- Apartments and offices at 73 and 83 R. Alexandre Herculano Viseu, Centro
- Bus Station (Ernesto Camilo Korrodi), Caldas da Rainha, Oeste, 1949
- Café Central, Santarém, Alentejo, 1937
- Cine-Theater, Sobral de Monte Agraço, Greater Lisbon District
- Cinema Carlos Alberto, Sintra, Greater Lisbon District
- Cinema da Ponta do Sol, Ponta do Sol, Madeira, 1933
- Commercial building at Avenida José da Costa Mealha 94, Loulé, Faro, Algarve
- Edificio O Coreto, Loulé, Faro, Algarve
- Emporium Apartment building, Porto, 1940s
- Grocery store at 24 Largo General Humberto Delgado, Viseu, Centro
- Loulé Coreto Hotel, Loulé, Faro, Algarve
- Misericórdia Cine-Theater, Chamusca, Santarém, Alentejo, 1942
- Portarade Suites Hotel and Restaurant, Ferragundo, Lagoa, Algarve
- Theater Rosa Damasceno, Santarém, Alentejo, 1937
- Tribunal Judicial da Comarca de Faro – Secção Central (County Courthouse), Faro, Algarve, 1930s

=== Coimbra ===
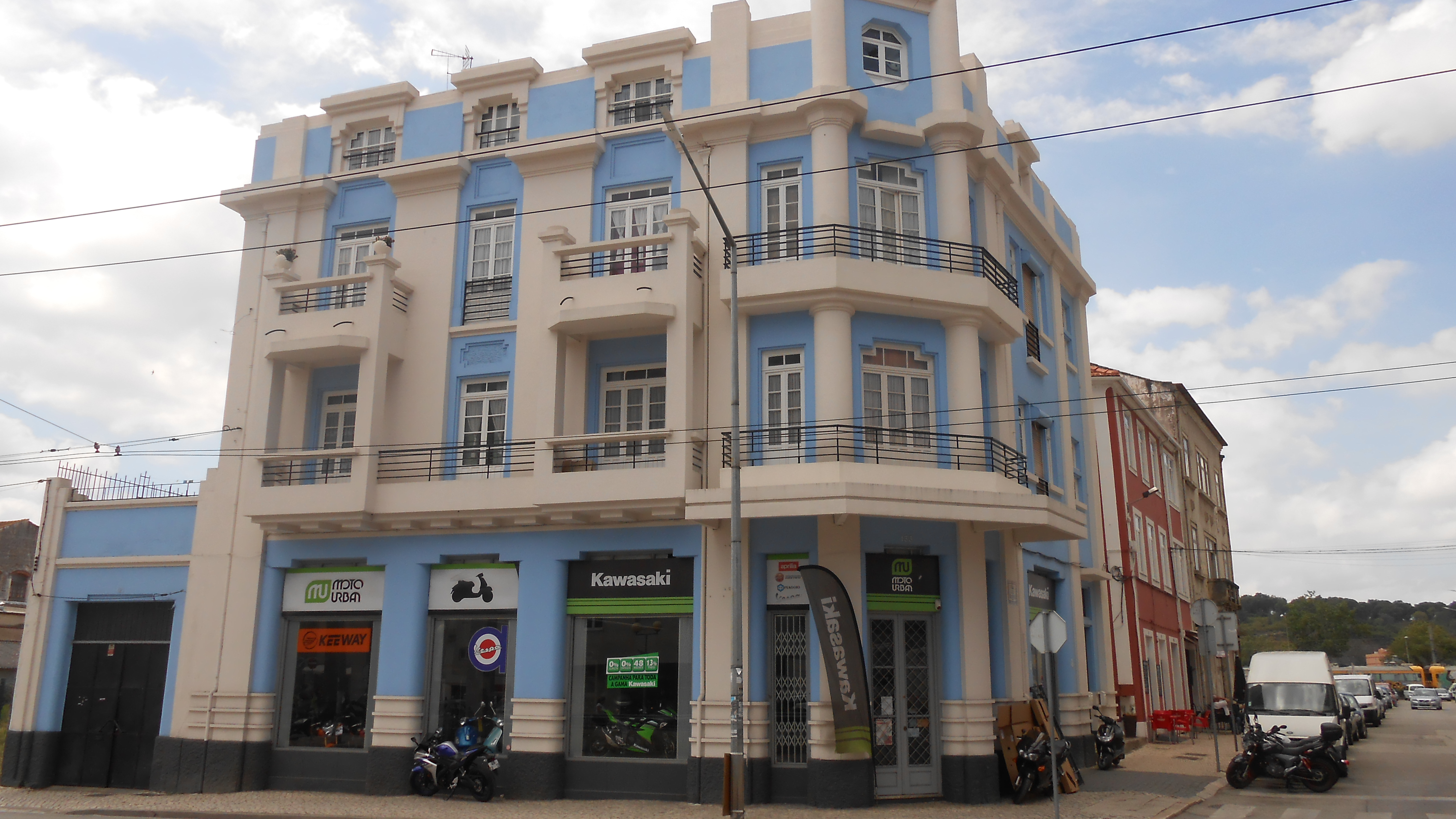
Commercial building at Av. Fernão de Magalhães 133, Coimbra, Portugal

- Alfarelos/Granja do Ulmeiro station, Granja do Ulmeiro, Soure, Coimbra, Central
- Associação Humanitária de Bombeiros Voluntários de Coimbra, Coimbra
- Auto-Industrial, SA - Opel and Isuzu, Coimbra
- Biblioteca Geral, University of Coimbra General Library, Coimbra
- Commercial building at R. João Machado 31, Coimbra
- Commercial building at Av. Fernão de Magalhães 133, Coimbra
- Hotel Mondego, Coimbra, 1930s
- José Falcão High School (Secondary School), Coimbra, Central, 1928

=== Funchal ===
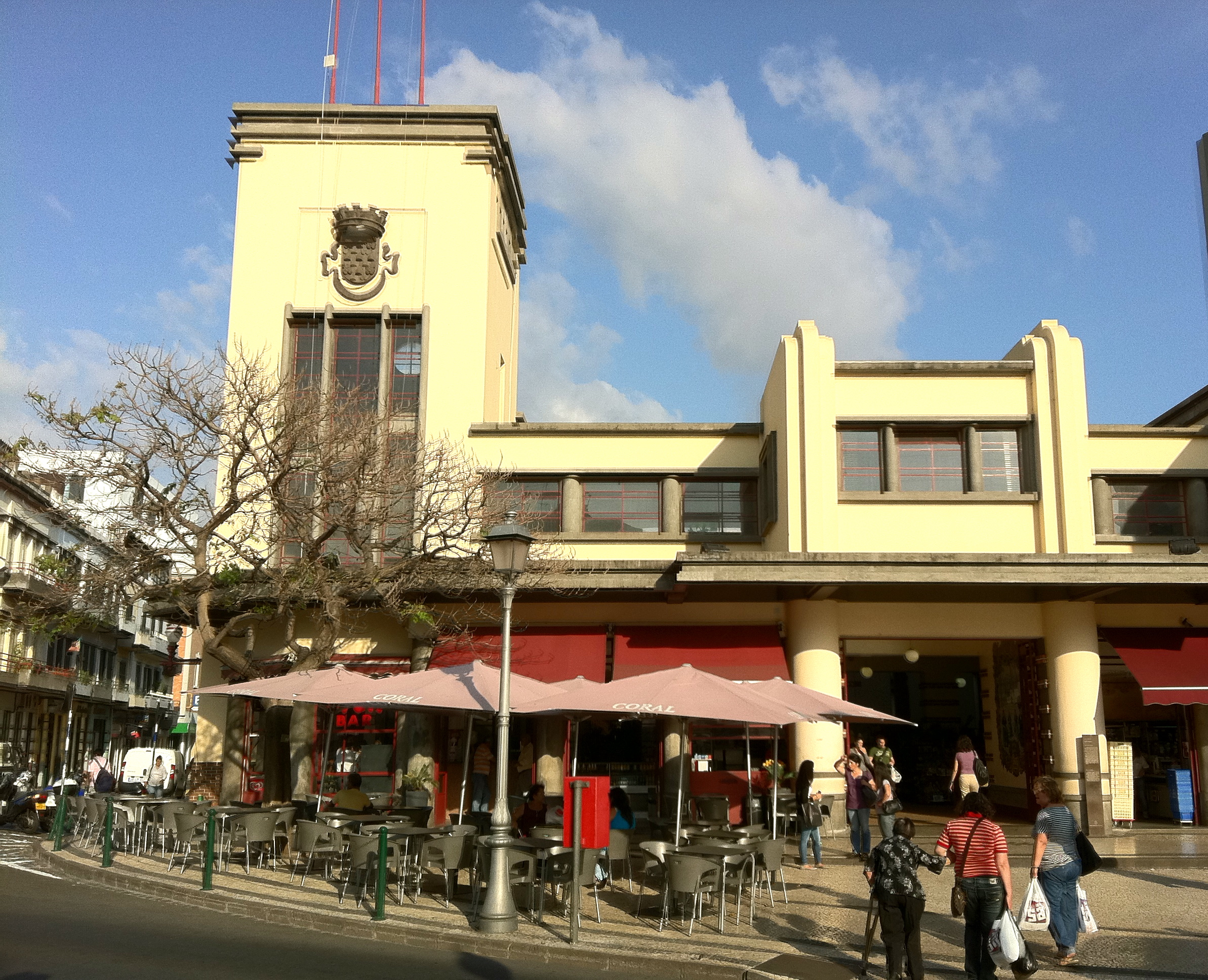
Mercado dos Lavradores, Funchal, Madeira, Portugal

- Casa de Saúde da Carreira, São Pedro, Funchal, Madeira
- Casa do Dr. Walter Belmonte, Funchal, Madeira, 1945
- Cliff elevator at Rua Portao Sao Tiago, Funchal, Madeira
- Hospital Dr. João de Almada, Funchal, Madeira, 1940
- Hotel Galerias Jardins da Ajuda, Funchal, Madeira
- Lar Santa Isabel nursing home (former hospital), Funchal, Madeira, 1936
- Liceu de Jaime Moniz (Escola Secundária Jaime Moniz), Funchal, Madeira, 1946
- Mercado dos Lavradores, Funchal, Madeira, 1940
- Oudinot Shopping Center, Funchal, Madeira
- Slaughterhouse (Matadouro), Funchal, Madeira

=== Lisbon ===
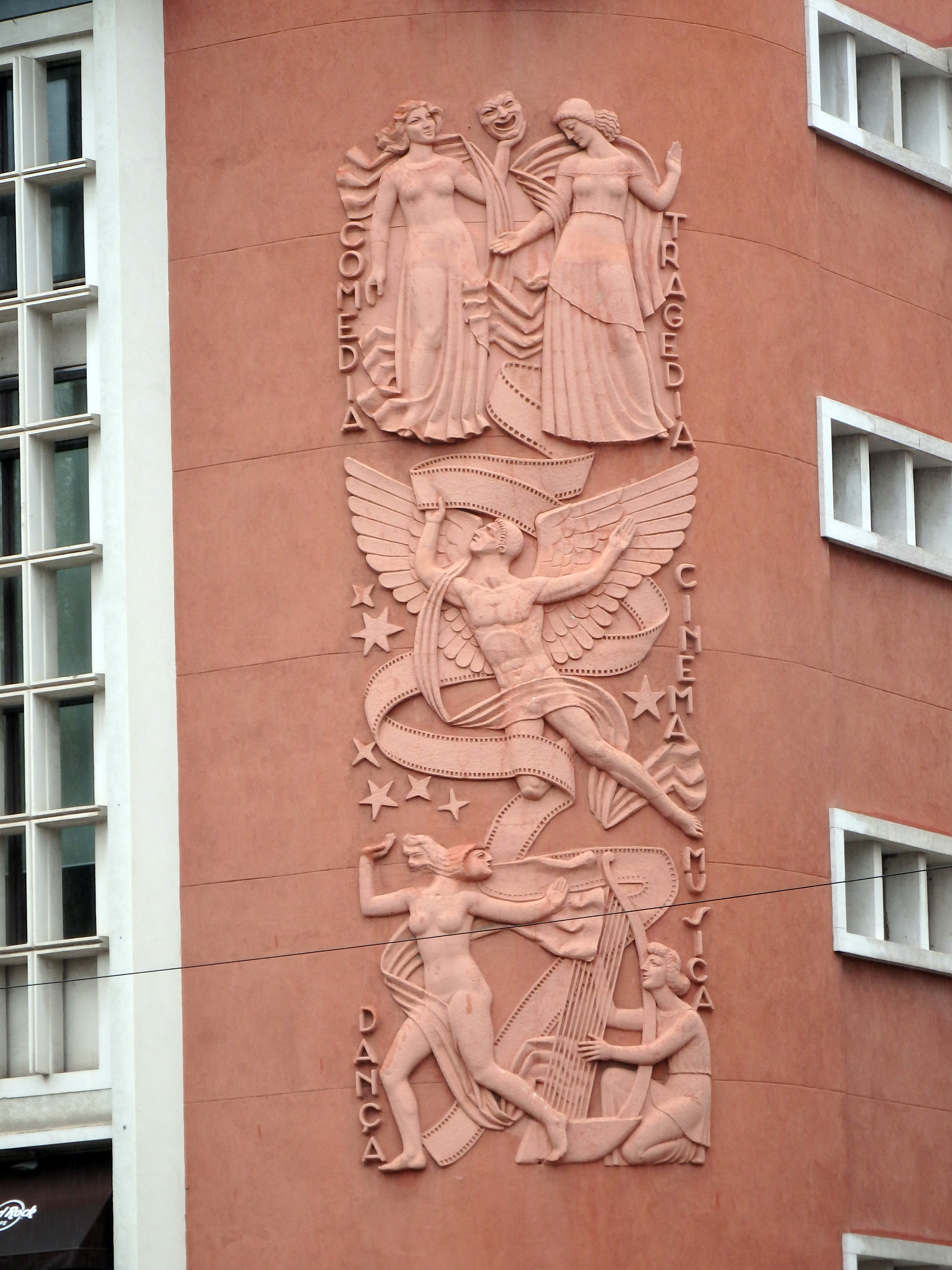
Detail from former Condes Cinema (now Hard Rock Cafe), Lisbon, Portugal

- 42 Campo Pequeno Street, Lisbon
- 168–170 Avenida da Liberdade, Lisbon
- A Barraca theatre (formerly Teatro Cinearte), Lisbon, 1938
- Apartments at Avenida António Augusto de Aguiar, Saldanha, Lisbon, 1930s
- Apartments at corner of R. Fialho de Almeida and Av. Pedro Álvares Cabral, Lisbon
- Apartments at Av. Praia da Vitória 50, Lisbon
- Apartments at 169, 171, 175, 179, 183, and 185 Rua do Salitre, Rato, Lisbon
- Café A Brasileira, Lisbon, 1905, 1922
- Cais do Sodré Railway Station, (Pardal Monteiro), Lisbon, 1928
- Capitólio Cinema, (Cristino da Silva), Lisbon, 1931
- Casa Gardénia, Edificio na Rua Garret, Lisbon, 1993
- Cinema Império, Lisbon, 1947-1952
- Cinema Batalha (formerly Cinema High Life), Portugal, 1947
- Cinema Paris, Lisbon, 1931
- Cineteatro Éden, 1937
- Diário de Notícias Building (newspaper), Lisbon, 1940
- Estação Fluvial de Sul-Sueste (River station), Lisbon, 1932
- Estação Marítima da Rocha do Conde de Óbidos, Estrela (Maritime station, ship terminal), Lisbon
- Garage Liz, Lisbon, 1933
- Alcântara Maritime Terminal (port building), Alcântara, Lisboa, 1943–1948
- Gare Marítima da Rocha do Conde de Óbidos (port building), Cais da Rocha, 1934
- Hard Rock Cafe (formerly Condes Cinema), Lisbon, 1927
- Igreja de Nossa Senhora do Rosário de Fátima (Our Lady of Fatima church, Pardal Monteiro), Lisbon, 1938
- Instituto Nacional de Estatística (National Institute for Statistics - Statistics Portugal), Lisbon, 1935
- Instituto Superior Técnico, Lisbon, 1927
- Jardim do Ultramar (Botanical Garden) buildings, Belém, Lisbon
- Laboratório Nacional de Engenharia Civil, Lisbon, 1946
- National Statistics Institute, (Pardal Monteiro), Lisbon, 1930
- Teatro Capitólio, Parque Mayer, Lisbon, 1931
- Teatro Maria Vitória, Parque Mayer, Lisbon, 1922
- Vitória Labor Center of the Portuguese Communist Party (formerly Hotel Vitória, Cassiano Branco), Lisbon, 1936
- Universidade de Lisboa, Faculdade de Direito (School of Law), Lisbon, 1952
- Universidade de Lisboa, Faculdade de Letras (School of Literature), Lisbon, 1952
- Universidade de Lisboa Rectory, Lisbon, 1952

=== Porto ===
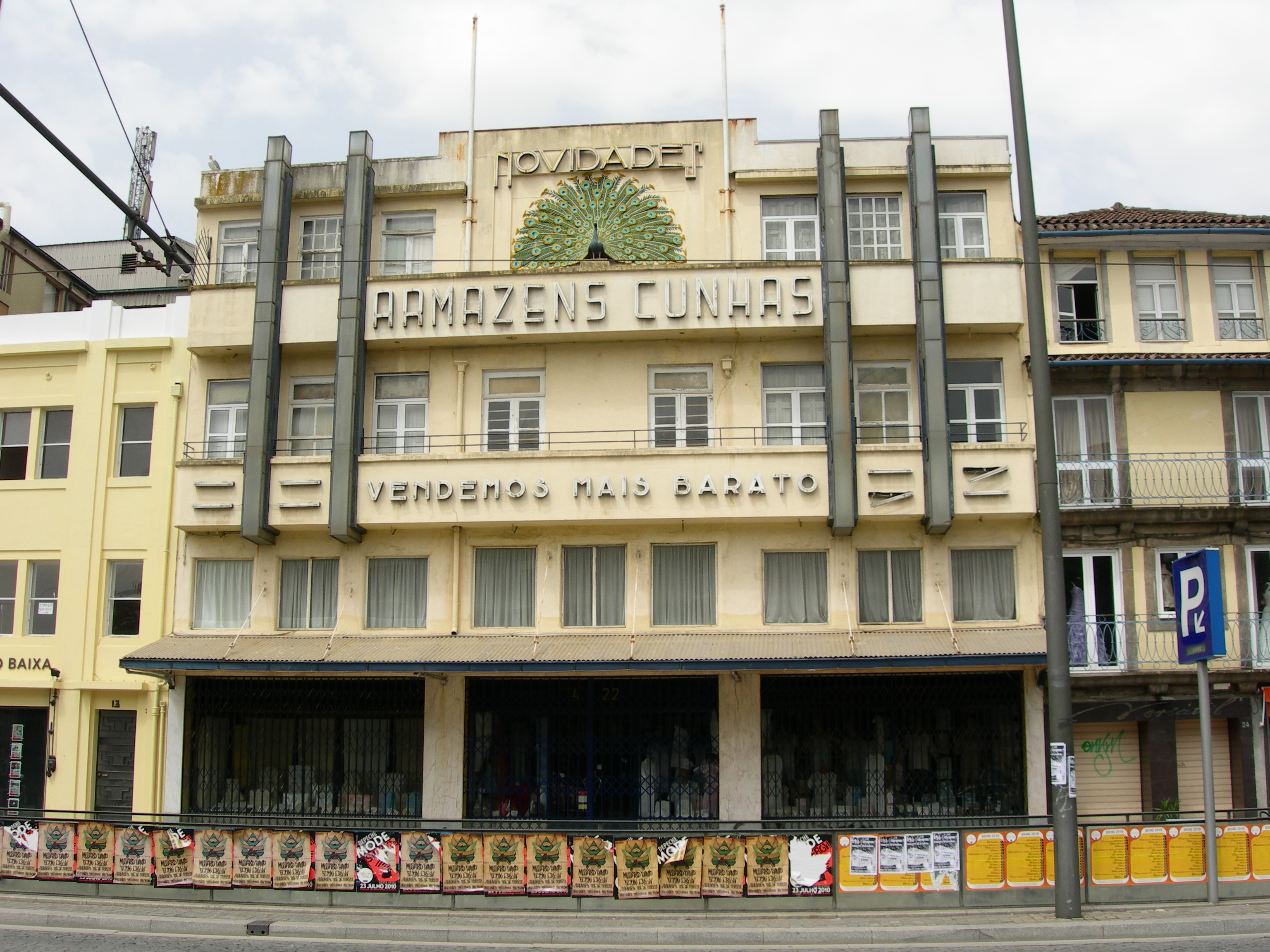
Armazéns Cunha department store, Porto, Portugal

- Armazéns Cunhas department store, Porto, 1936
- Casa de Serralves, (Marques da Silva), Porto, 1940
- Cinema Batalha, Porto, 1947
- Cine Teatro Julio Deniz, Porto, 1930s
- Cine-Teatro Vale Formoso, Porto, late 1940s
- Club Fluvial Portuense, Porto, 1933
- Coliseum of Porto, Porto, 1941
- Edifício d'O Comércio (now Banco Internacional do Funchal), Porto
- Edifício Imperial (formerly Cafe Imperial, now McDonald's) Porto
- Estação de serviços (Service Station and Maus Hábitos cultural organization), Rua de Passos Manuel, Porto, 1939
- Farmácia Vitália, Porto, 1932
- Garage on Rua de Passos Manuel, Porto
- Hotel Vincci, Porto, 1934
- Quiosque do Serviço de Transportes Colectivos (Transportation kiosk), Santo Ildefonso, Porto, 2017
- Rivoli Theatre, (Júlio Brito), Porto, 1923

== Romania ==
- Academic College (Casa Universitarilor), Cluj-Napoca, 1937
- Cinema Arta, Cluj-Napoca, 1924
- Cinema Victoria, Cluj-Napoca
- Hotel Rex, Mamaia, 1936
- Unitarian Church, Braşov

=== Bucharest ===
Palatul Telefonelor, Telephone Palace, Bucharest, Romania

- Apartments at 127 Calea Moșilor, Bucharest
- ArCub (formerly Palatul Societății Funcționarilor Publici/Palace of the Society of Civil Servants), Bucharest, 1934
- ARO Bucharest building, (former Patria Cinema) Bucharest, 1931
- ASIROM Vienna Insurance building (formerly Fostul Hotel), Bucharest, 1930s
- Athénée Palace Hilton, Bucharest, 1914
- Building at 13, Strada Piața Amzei, Bucharest
- Capitol Cinema, Bucharest, 1912, 1938
- Cinema Aro (formerly Scala Cinema), Bucharest, 1937
- Cinematograf Europa, Bucharest, 1935
- Corneliu Coposu House, Bucharest
- Frascati Building, Bucharest
- Gara de Nord (Bucharest North Railway Station), Bucharest, 1928
- Hotel Ambasador, Bucharest, 1939
- Hotel Lido, Bucharest, 1930
- Hotel Negoiu (now Banco Turco), Bucharest, 1929
- Hotel Opera, Bucharest, 1934
- Hotel Union, Bucharest, 1931
- House of Magistrates, Bucharest, 1937
- Palatul CFR, Bucharest, 1937
- Palatul Societății Funcționarilor Publici (Palace of the Society of Civil Servants), Bucharest, 1034
- Palatul Monopolurilor de Stat (Palace of State Monopolies), Bucharest, 1931–1941
- Palatul Telefoanelor, (Telephone Palace), Bucharest, 1934
- Teatrul Constantin Tănase (Tănase Theatre), Bucharest, 1919, 1945
- Villa Solly Gold, Bucharest, 1934
- Volo Hotel, Bucharest

=== Constanța ===
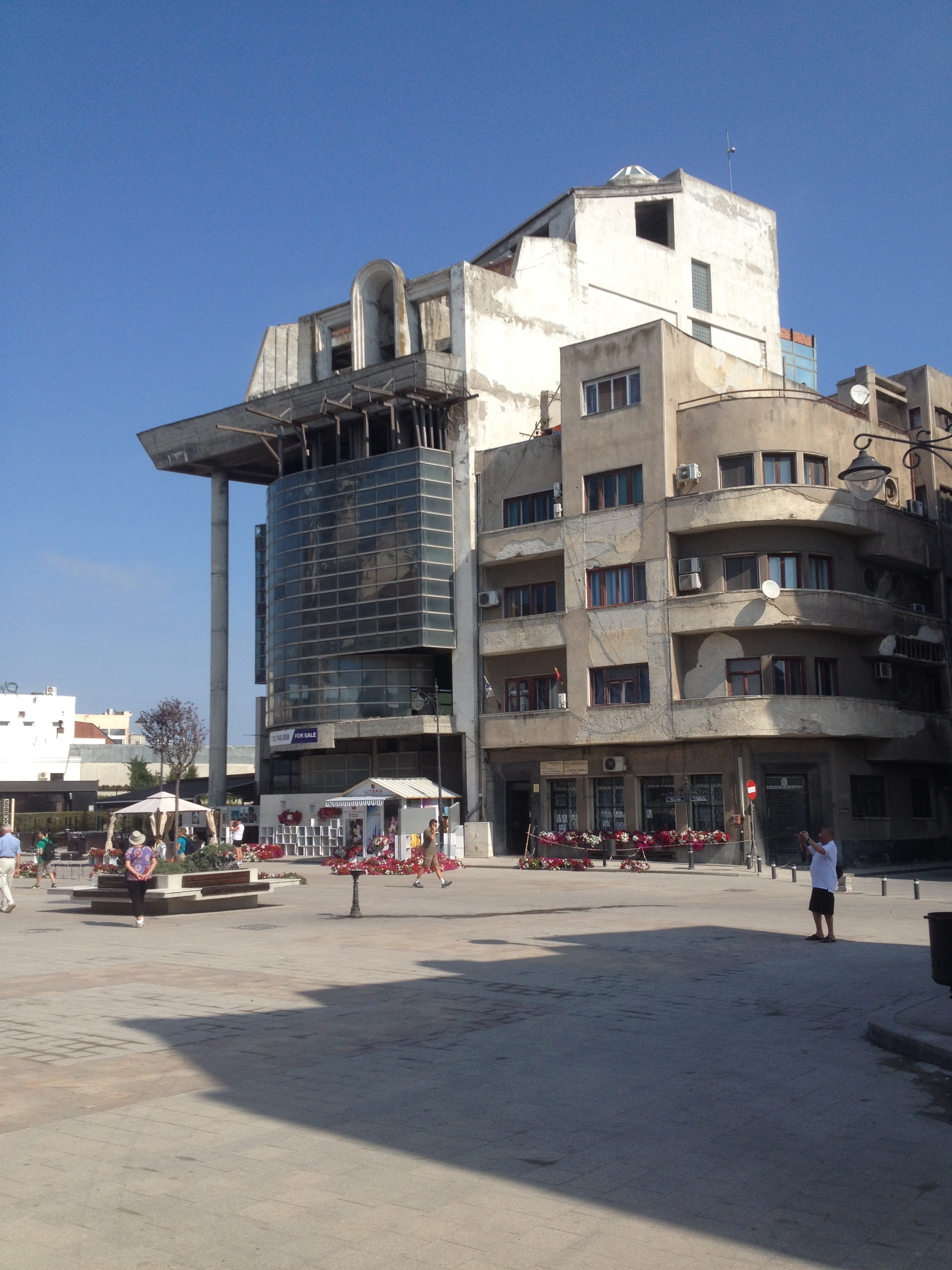
Building in Constanța, Romania

- Bloc A4, Bulevardul Ferdinand, Constanța
- Acord apartment building, Constanța
- Apartments at 26, 40, 48, 52 and 54 Bulevardul Ferdinand, Constanța
- Arpinav offices, Bulevardul Ferdinand, Constanța
- Buildings at 56, 78 and 80 Bulevardul Tomis, Constanța
- Casino Mamaia, Constanța
- CFR Călători Train Station office, Bulevardul Ferdinand, Constanța
- Constanța Train Station, Constanța
- Gara C.F. Maritimă, Constanța
- Hotel Ferdinand, Constanța
- Lupamed/Cardiomed, Bulevardul Ferdinand, Constanța
- Radio Sky offices, Bulevardul Ferdinand, Constanța
- Restaurant Scapino, Bulevardul Ferdinand, Constanța
- Romned Port Operator Storage building, Constanța

== Russia ==
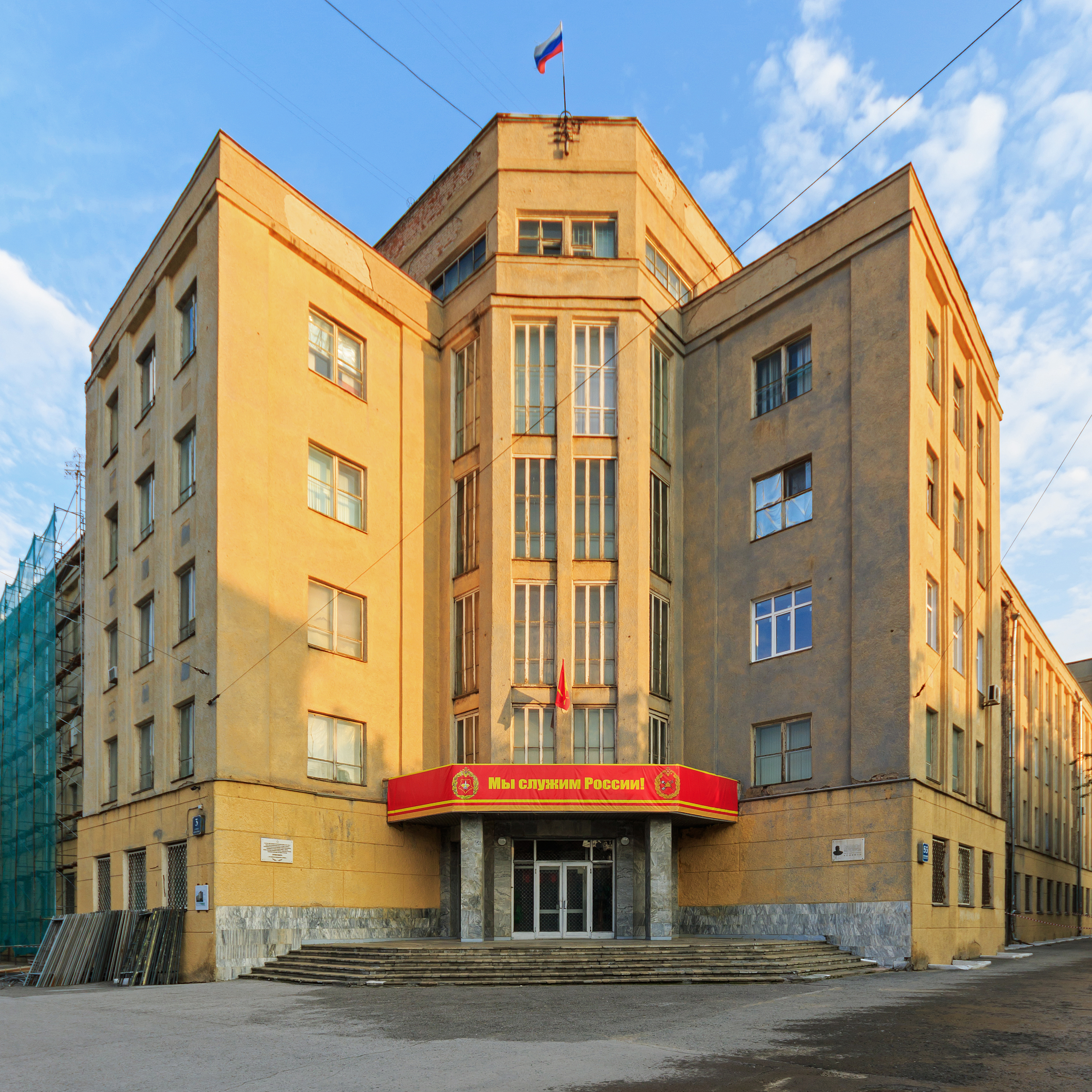
Army staff building, Novosibirsk Krasny, Russia

- Aeroport Metro Station, Moscow, 1938
- Army staff building, Novobirisk Krasny
- Council of Labor and Defense building, Moscow, 1935
- Hotel Astoria, St. Petersburg, 1912
- Hotel Astoria (Hotel Volga), Saratov, 1917
- Kremlin Gas Station on Volkhonka street, Moscow, 1930s
- Mayakovskaya Metro station, Moscow, 1938
- Ministry of Aviation Industry building, Moscow, 1934
- Ministry of Foreign Affairs building, Moscow, 1953
- Oreanda Hotel, Yalta, 1907
- State Archive of the Russian Federation, Moscow
- Stokvartirny House (The 100-Flat Building), Novosibirsk, 1937
- Telephone station of the Frunzensky district, Moscow, 1933
- Third Home Office, Moscow, 1938–1951

== Serbia ==
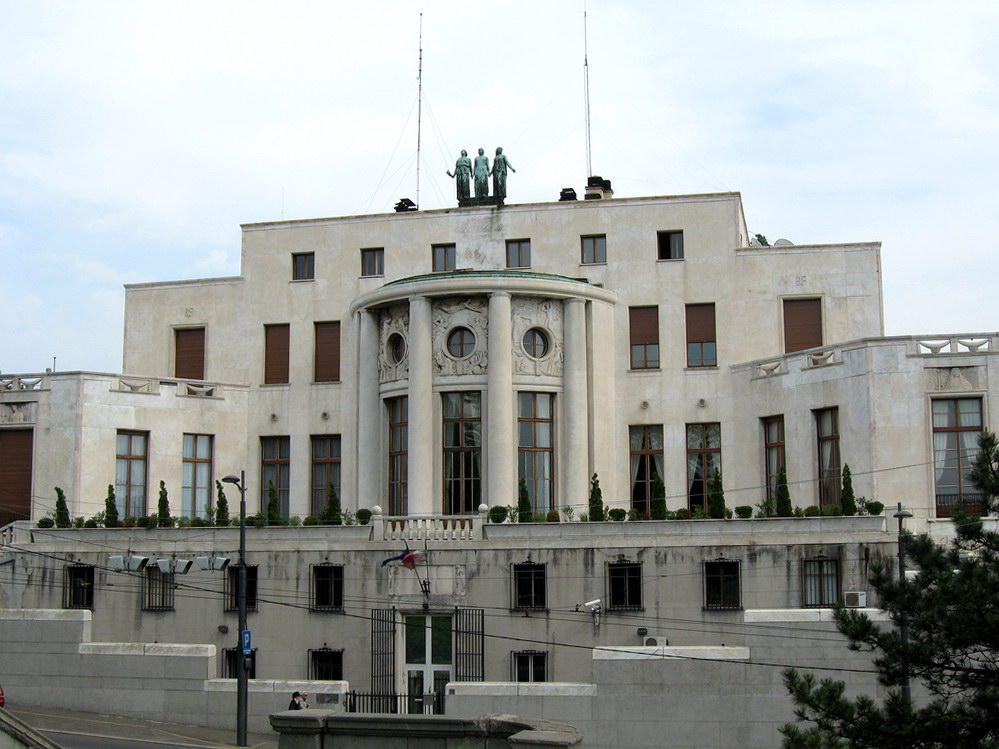
Embassy of France, Belgrade, Serbia

- Agrarian Bank Building, Belgrade, 1934
- Air Force Command Building, Belgrade, 1935
- Building of the First Danube Steamboat Society, Belgrade, 1929
- Cvijeta Zuzorić Art Pavilion, Belgrade, 1928
- Embassy of France (by Roger-Henri Expert), Belgrade, 1929
- Ethnographic Museum, Belgrade
- Faculty of Law, University of Belgrade, Belgrade, 1936–1940
- Igumanova palača (Igman's Palace), Belgrade, 1938
- Palace Albanija, Belgrade, 1940
- Pension Fund Building (now Theatre-on-Terazije), Belgrade, 1939
- PRIZAD building, Belgrade, 1937
- Serbian Journalists’ Association Building, Vračar, Belgrade, 1934

== Slovakia ==
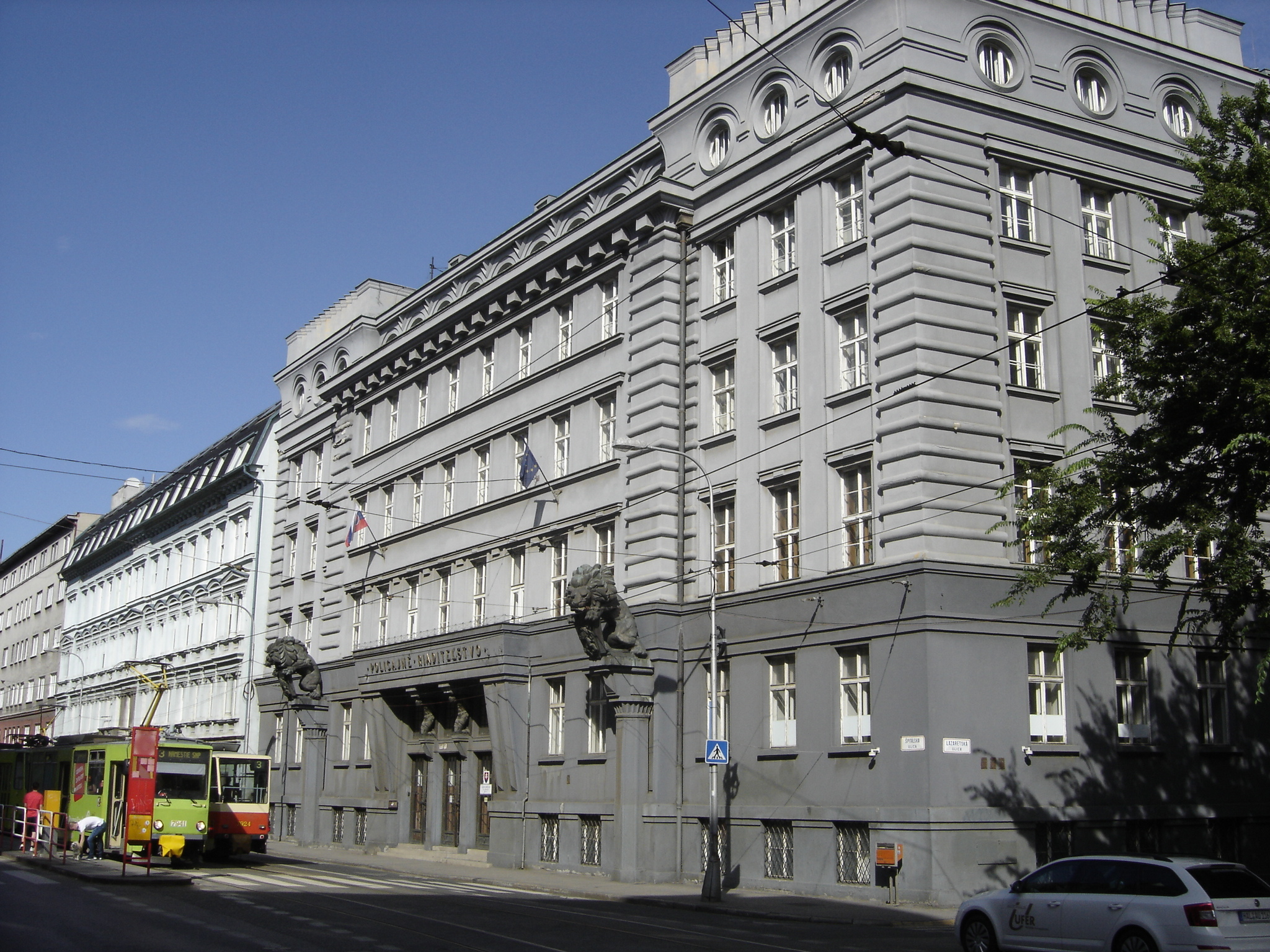
Police headquarters building ("The two lions building" – "U dvoch levov"), Bratislava, Slovakia

- Dušan Jurkovič's villa, Lermontovova, Bratislava, 1924
- General Post Office, Košice, 1930
- Heydukova Street Synagogue, Bratislava, 1926
- High school dormitory on Ulica 29 Augusta (August 29 Street), Bratislava, 1925
- Kino Choč, Donly Kubin
- Metropol Building - Metropol Cafe, Bratislava, 1928
- Police headquarters building ("The two lions building"- "U dvoch levov"), Bratislava, 1922
- Post Office (formerly Hotel Luxor), Trenčianske Teplice
- Slovak National Theatre cooperative apartments, Bratislava, 1923
- Trenčianske Teplice hydroelectric power plant, Trenčianske Teplice, 1920
- Tvarožkova Villa, Bratislava, 1921
- Unicredit Bank, Martin, 1940
- Vúb Bank, Martin
- YMCA Building, Bratislava, 1921

== Slovenia ==
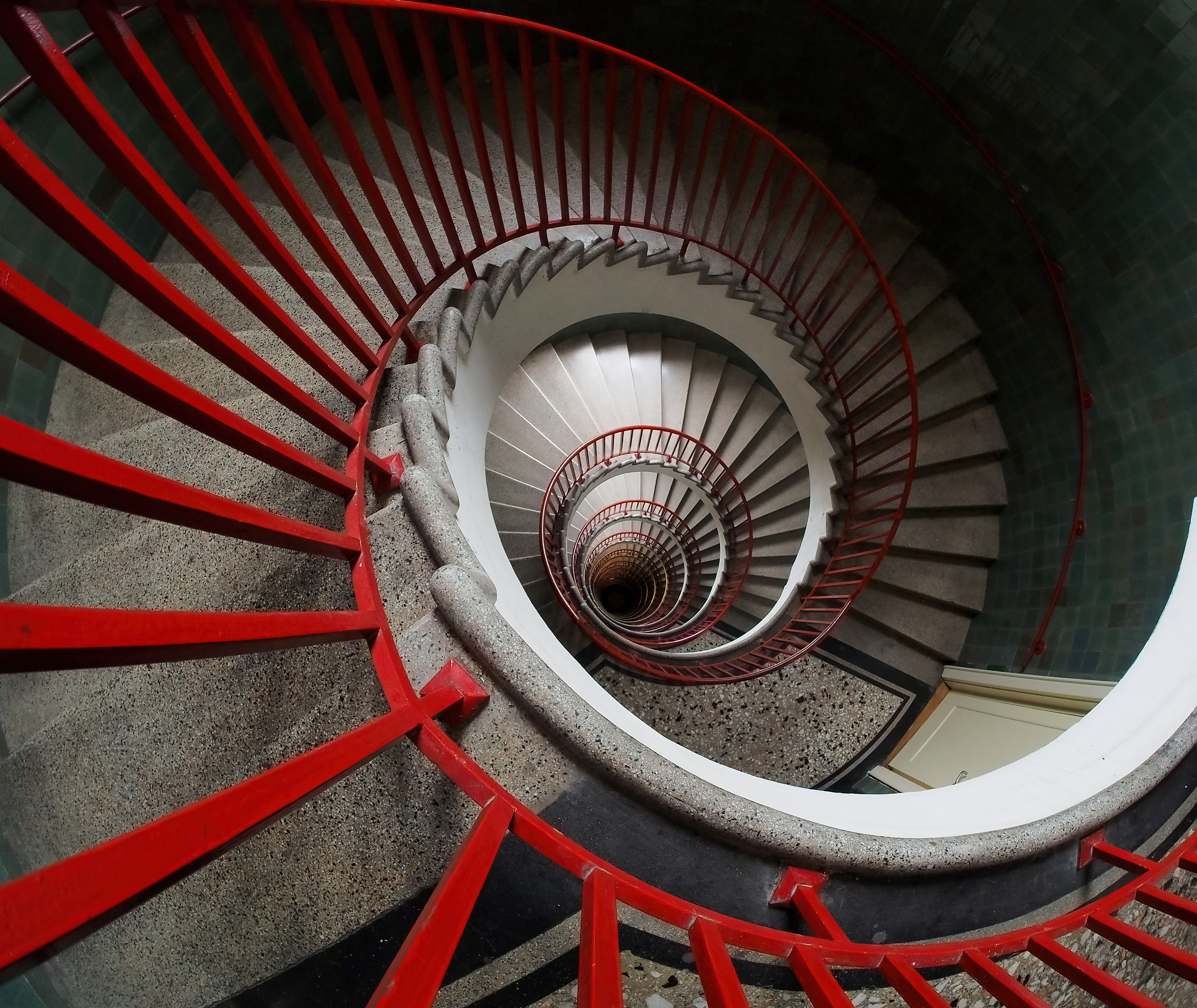
Art déco spiral stairs. Nebotičnik skyscraper, Ljubljana, Slovenia

- Nebotičnik skyscraper, Ljubljana (1933)

== Spain ==
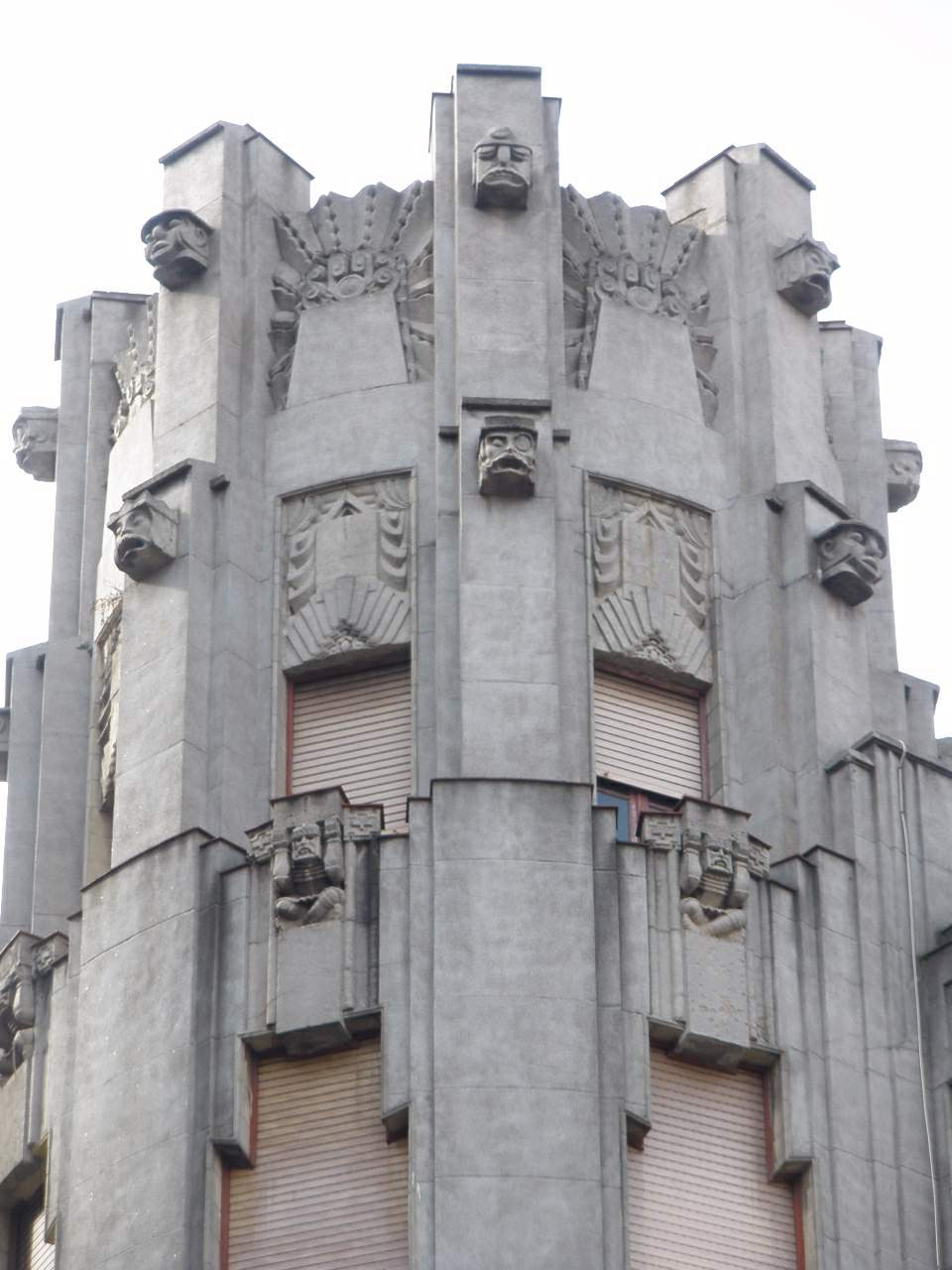
27 Marqués de San Esteban, Gijón, Asturias, Spain

- 4 Calle Asturias, Gijón, Asturias
- 19 Calle Císter, Málaga, Andalusia, 1927
- 27 Marqués de San Esteban, Gijón, Asturias
- 38 Iparraguirre y Licenciado Poza, Bilbao
- Biblioteca Foral de Bizkaia, Bilbao, 1924
- Bus station, Cartagena, Murcia, 1995
- Caja General de Ahorros de Ferrol (General Savings Bank of Ferrol), Ferrol, Galicia, 1934
- Caja Rural de Soria, Soria, Castilla y León
- Casa Blanca, Oviedo, Asturias, 1932
- Centro de Estudios Públicos Luis Briñas, Santutxu, Bilbao, 1933
- Colegio de la Asunción, Málaga, Andalusia, 1950
- Edificio la Aurora, Bilbao, 1935
- Edificio Central de Correos (Central Post Office), Sevilla, 1930
- Edificio Curbera, Vigo, Galicia, 1939
- Edificio Sanchón, Vigo, Pontevedra, Galicia, 1935
- Edificio Seguros Santa Lucía, Seville, Andalusia, 1910
- Edificio Siboney, Santander, Cantabria, 1931
- former Farmacia Méndez, Málaga, Andalusia, 1952
- Gasolinera Goya, Vitoria, Álava, 1935
- Teatro Góngora, Córdoba, 1932
- Teatro Virginia, Sotrondio, San Martín del Rey Aurelio, Asturias, 1930

=== Alicante Province ===
- Cine Astoria, Alicante, 1930s
- Cine Goya, Alcoy, 1949
- Edificio La Adriática, Alicante, 1936
- Edificio Galiana, Alicante, 1935
- Edificio Merín, Cocentaina, Alicante Province, 1931
- Edificio Reyes de Anta-Barrio, Alicante, 1929
- Edificio Roma, Alicante, 1942
- Edificio La Unión y el Fénix, Alicante, 1942
- San Jorge Bridge, Alcoy, Alicante Province, 1931

=== Barcelona Province ===
- Alexandra Teatro, Barcelona, 1947
- Casa Ferran Guardiola (Casa China), Barcelona, 1929
- Casa Lluís Ferrer-Vidal, Barcelona, 1916
- Jorba Building, Manresa, Bages, Barcelona Province
- Myrurgia perfume factory, Barcelona, 1930
- Phenomena Experience Room (formerly Cinestudio Napoles, Cine Napols), Barcelona, 1962
- Teatro Borrás, Barcelona, 1931

=== Madrid ===
- 10 Juan de Austria, Madrid
- 25 Bustamante, Madrid
- 27 Marcelino Camacho, Madrid
- 45 Calle de Alcalá (formerly Banco de Vizcaya building), Madrid, 1934
- 49 Altamirano, Madrid
- 52 Gran Vía, Juzgados de lo Contencioso-Administrativo y de Primera Instancia. Madrid, 1931
- Capitol Building/Edificio Carrión, Madrid, 1933
- Casa de las Flores, Madrid, 1930
- Central Telefónica, Tetuán, Madrid
- Centro Cultural Nicolás Salmerón, Madrid, 1933
- Cine Barceló, Madrid, 1930
- Cine Bilbao (now El Corte Inglés/Sfera shopping center), Madrid, 1925
- Cine Callao interior, Madrid, 1927
- Cine Capitol, Madrid, 1933
- Cine Doré (now Filmoteca Española), Madrid, 1925
- Cinema Europa, Madrid, 1928
- Edificio Coliseum (Teatro Coliseum), Madrid, 1933
- Edificio Serrano 37, Madrid
- Edificio La Unión y el Fénix, Madrid, 1931
- Hotel Vincci Centrum, Madrid, 1928
- Teatro Pavón, Madrid, 1925

=== Melilla ===
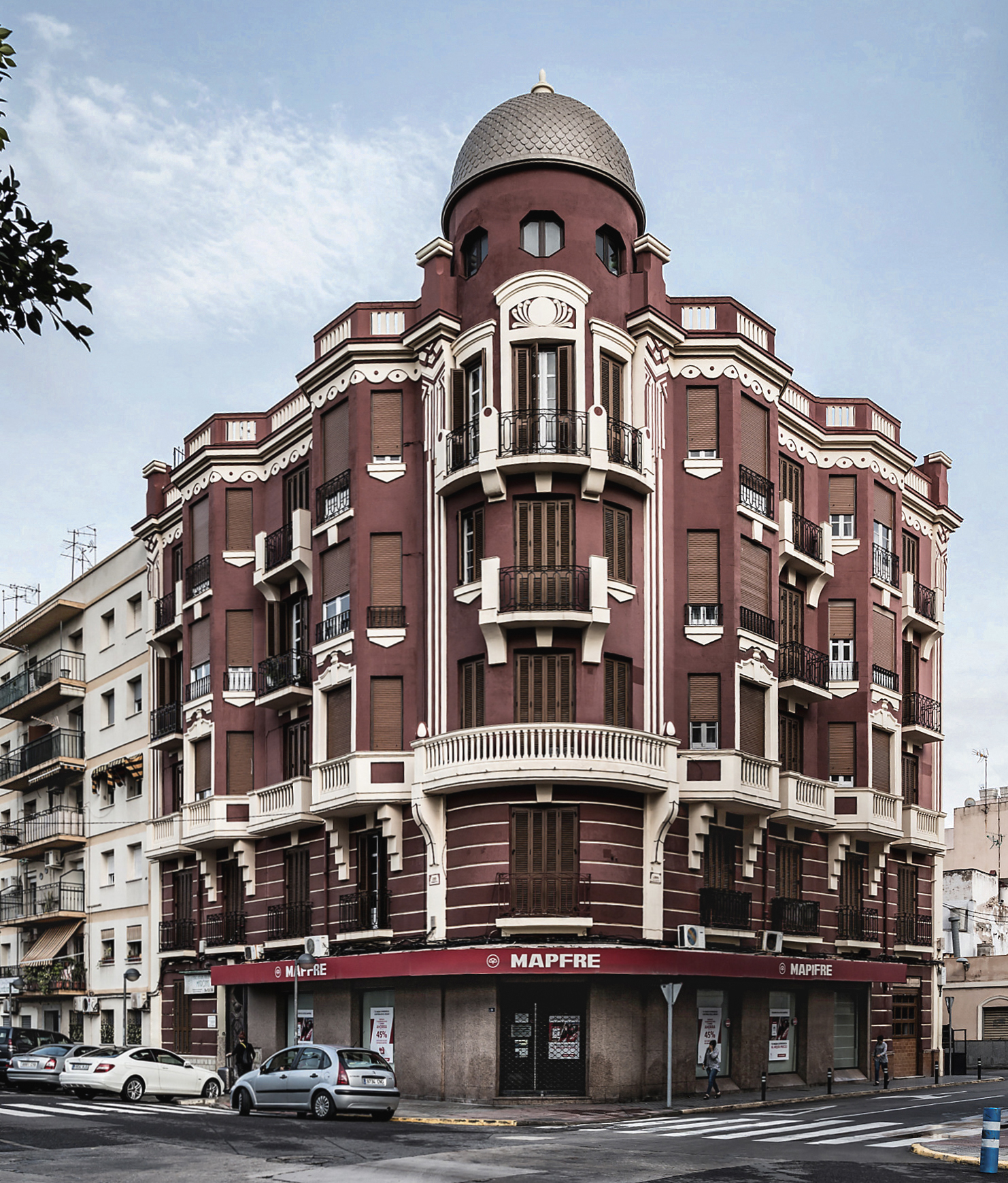
Edificio Rojo, Melilla, Spain

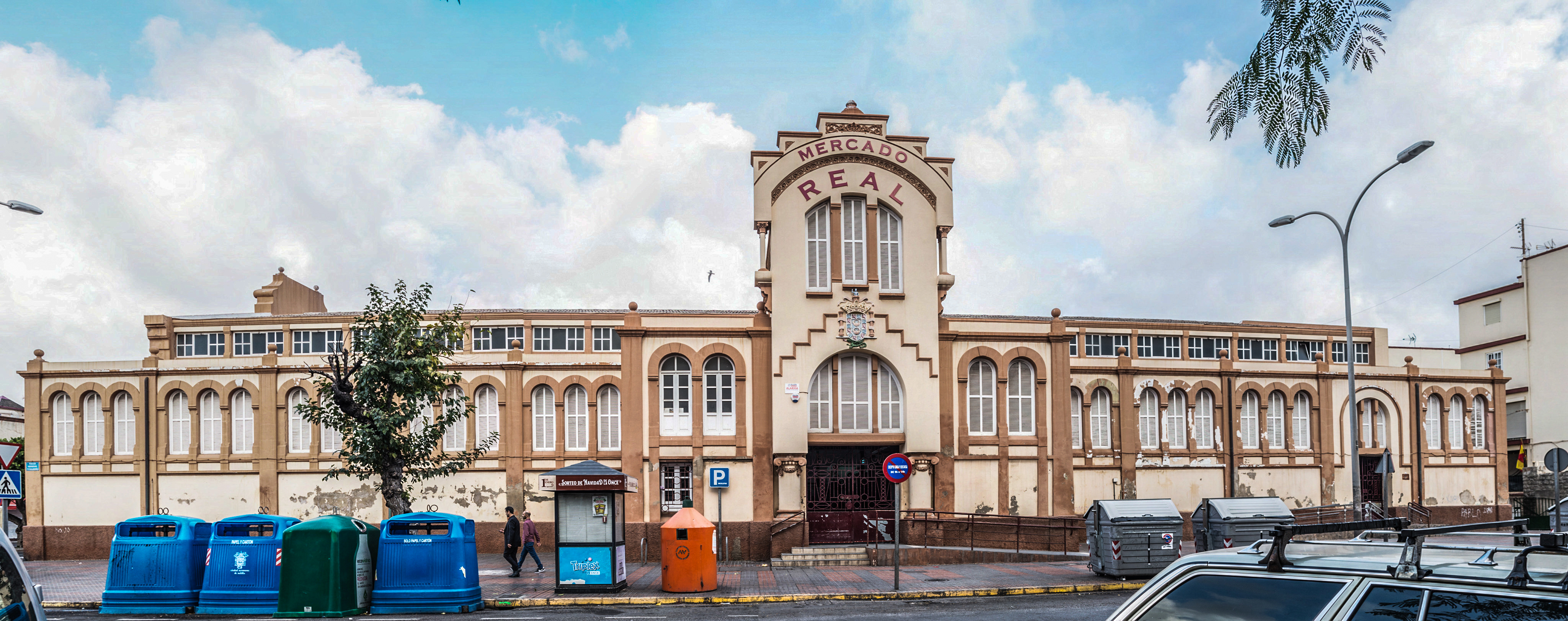
Mercado del Real, Melilla, Spain

- Casa Carcaño, Melilla, 1935
- Casa de Abraham Benatar, Melilla, 1934
- Casa de Bertila Seoane, Melilla, 1932
- Casa de Enrique Nieto, Melilla, 1932
- Casa de Jacinto García Marfil, Melilla, 1932
- Casa de Jacques EskEnazi Aguilerun, Melilla, 1938
- Casa de Josefa Botella Segarra, Melilla, 1936
- Casa de Juan Parres Puig, Melilla, 1936
- Casa de Luis Raya, 1932
- Casa de Pedro Fernández Batanero, Melilla, 1944
- Casa de Rafael Rico Albert, Melilla, 1935
- Chalet Ben Jeloun, Melilla, 1943
- Edificio Rojo, Melilla, 1935
- El Corte Inglés shopping center, Plaça de Catalunya, Barcelona
- Mercado del Real, Melilla, 1941
- Monumental Cinema Sport, Melilla, 1932
- Palacio de la Asamblea de Melilla, (Town Hall). Melilla, 1935–1943
- Villegas 7, Melilla, 1949

=== Valencia Province ===
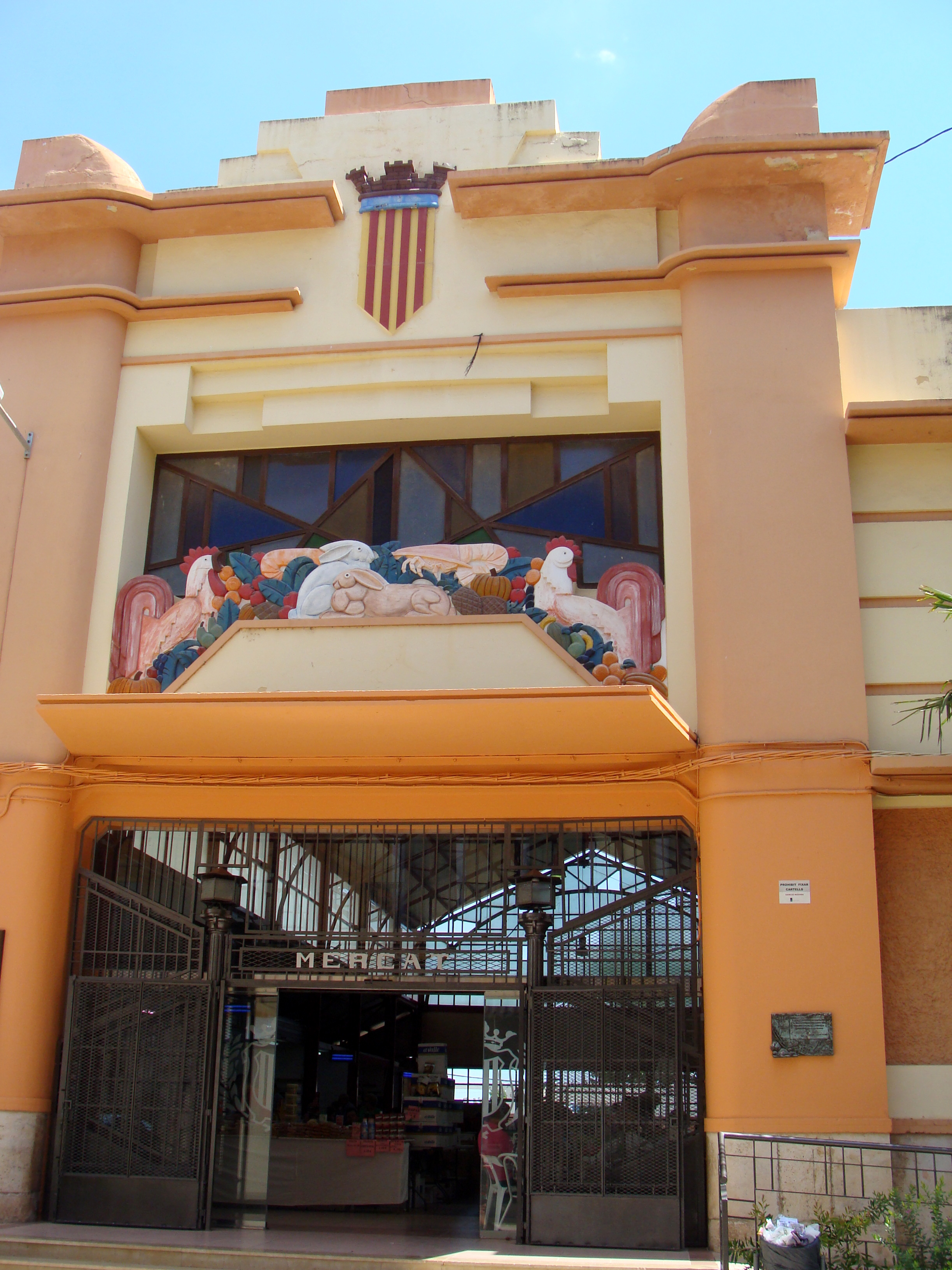
Mercado de Carlet, Valencia Province, Spain

- Ateneo Sueco del Socorro, Sueca, Valencia Province, 1929
- Bombas Hidráulicas Carlos Gens SL (Carlos Gens hydraulic pumps factory), Valencia, 1930
- Casa Judía, Valencia, 1930
- Cine Capitol, Valencia, 1930
- Cine Metropol, Valencia, 1934
- Cine Rialto, Valencia, 1939
- Colegio Mayor Luis Vives, Valencia, 1934–1954
- Edificio Alonso, Valencia, 1940
- Edificio Cánovas, Valencia, 1934
- Edificio Cervera, Valencia, 1931
- Edificio Cuadrado, Valencia, 1933
- Edificio Gil, Valencia, 1931
- Edificio Lorente, Valencia, 1929
- Edificio Martí Cortina, Valencia, 1943
- Edificio Roca, Valencia, 1936
- Edificio Roig Vives, Valencia, 1944
- Edificio Telefónica, Valencia, 1928
- Finca Roja, Valencia, 1933
- Garaje de TASA, Gandía, Valencia Province, 1934
- Mercado de Abastos, Valencia, 1939–1948
- Mercado municipal de Carlet, Carlet, Valencia Province, 1934
- Rectorado (Rectory), Universidad de Valencia, Valencia, 1908–1944
- Sociedad Recreativa la Agricultura, Sueca, Valencia Province, 1930s
- Teatro Serrano, Sueca, Valencia Province, 1934

== Sweden ==
- Bio Roy (Royal Cinema), Stockholm, 1940
- Biografen Manhattan, Stockholm, 1935
- Biografen Rival, Rival Hotel, Stockholm, 1937
- Nojeastern (formerly Amiralen Teatern), Malmo, 1940
- Saga Cinema, Stockholm, 1937

== Switzerland ==
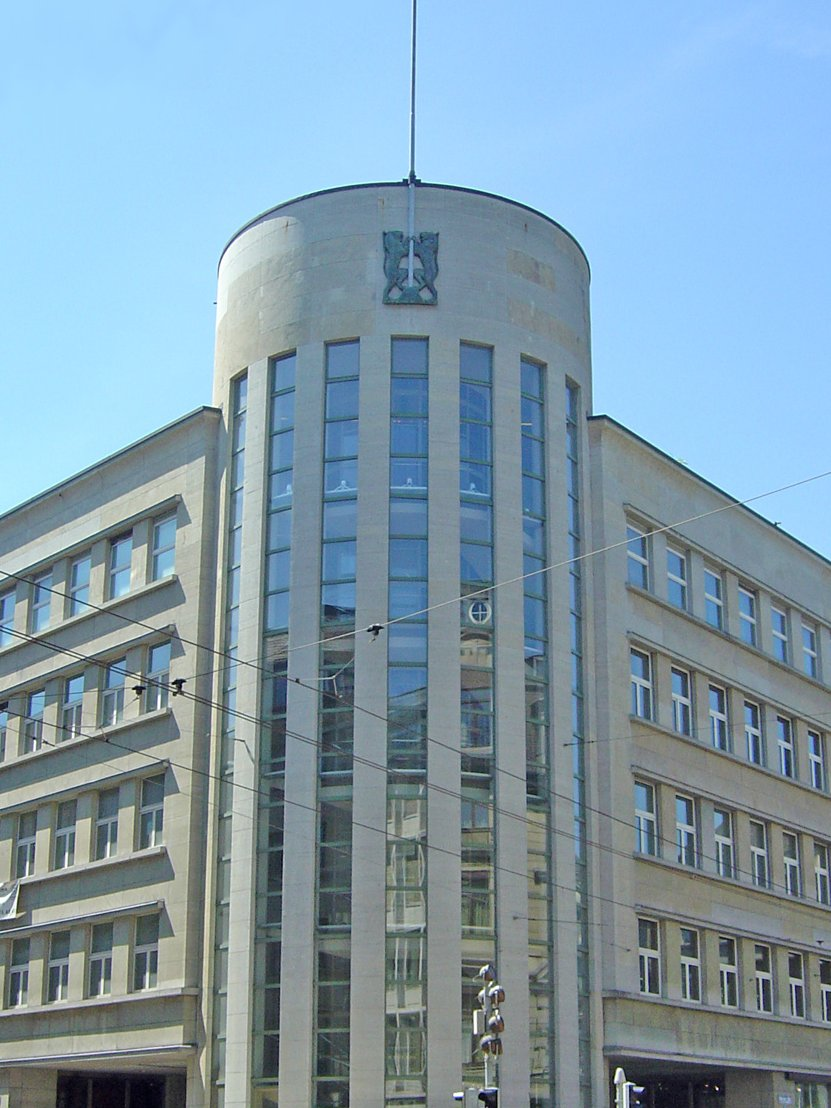
Alte Bourse – former stock exchange, Zürich, Switzerland

- former Alte Bourse (stock exchange building), Zürich, 1930
- Beau-Rivage Palace, Lausanne
- Capitol Cinema, Bern, 1929 (theater hall, interior decoration)
- Genève-Cornavin railway station, Geneva, 1858, 1931
- Lausanne Palace, Lausanne
- Loryspital, Hôpital de l'Île, Berne, 1929
- Palace of Nations, Geneva, 1938
- Tour de Bel-Air, Lausanne, 1932

== Turkey ==
- Ankara railway station, Ankara, 1937
- Bilecik Central Station, Bilecik
- Bursa Merinos Central Station, Bursa
- Çatalkaya Inn (General Directorate of Foundations), İzmir, 1931
- Court of Cassation - Supreme Court of Appeals of Turkey, Ankara, 1935
- İşbank Tower 1, Levent, Istanbul, 2000
- Kurukahveci Mehmet Efendi store at the Spice Bazaar, Istanbul
- School of Language and History-Geography, Ankara University, Ankara, 1950
- Sivas Central Station, Sivas, 1934
- Süreyya Opera House, Kadıköy, Istanbul, 1927
- Yayla Apartments, Istanbul, 1939

== Ukraine ==
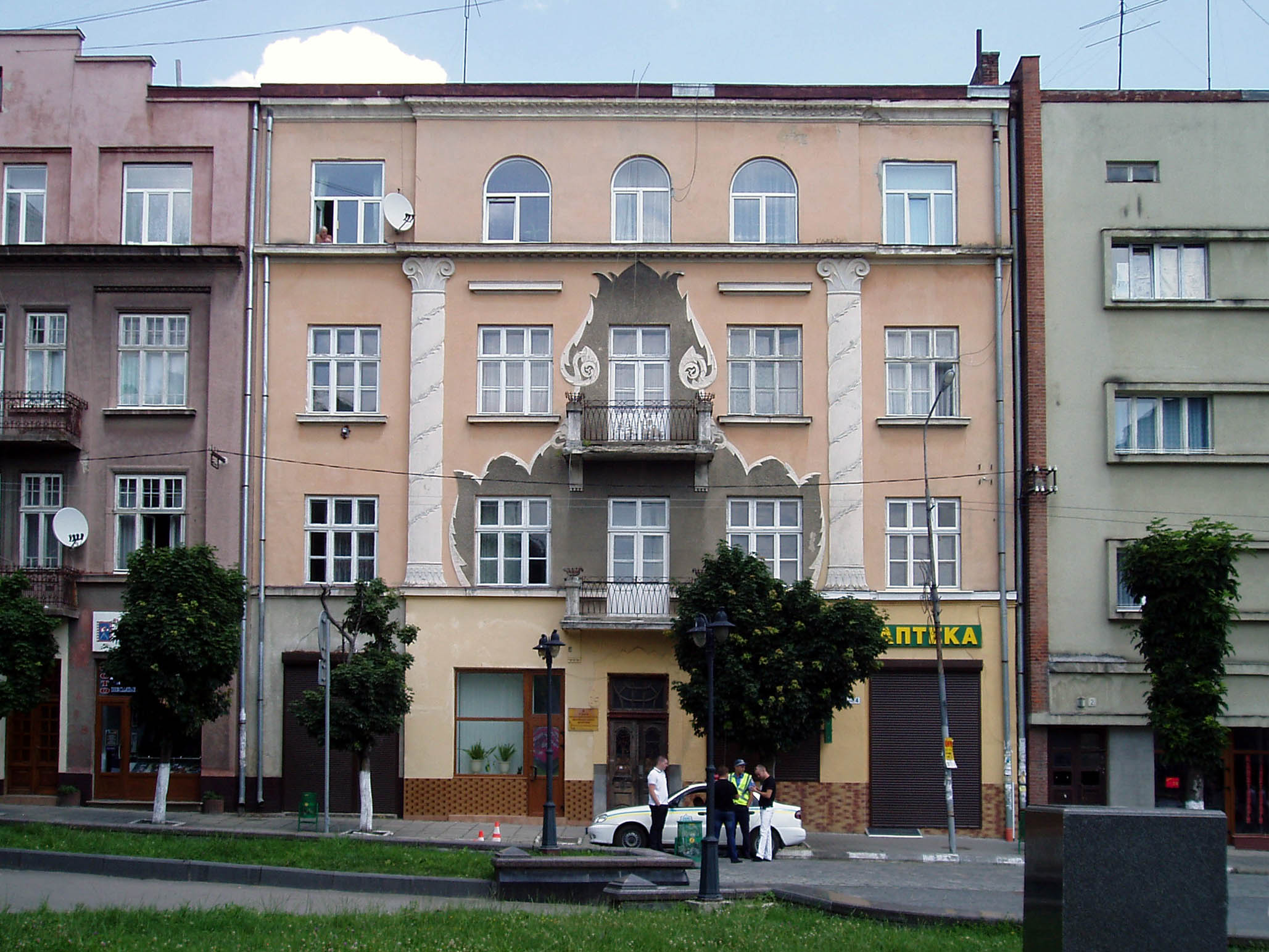
4 Osmomysla Street, Drohobych, Ukraine

- 4 Osmomysla Street, Drohobych
- Foxtrot Shopping Center, Odesa
- Ratusha (Ivano-Frankivsk), Ivano-Frankivsk, 1935
- Oreanda Hotel, Yalta, 1907, 1950s
- Peremoha Cinema, Mukachevo
- Town Hall, Rynok Square, Ivano-Frankivsk, Ivano-Frankivsk Oblast
- UKR Telecom, 37 Yevropeiska Street, Odesa

=== Kharkiv ===
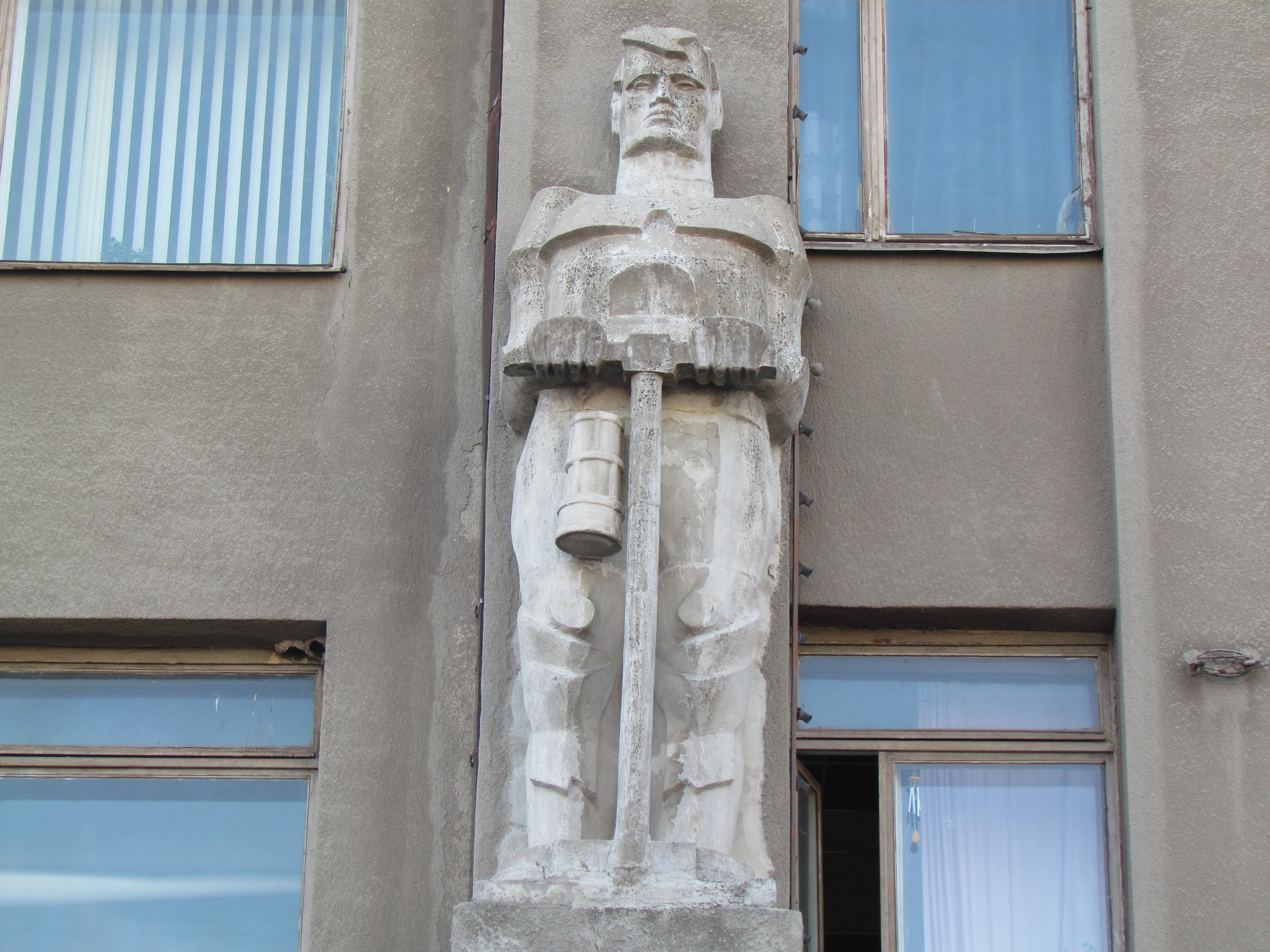
Detail of a coal miner by sculptor I. Kavaleridze at 5 Pushkins'ka Street, Kharkiv, Ukraine

- 5 Pushkinska Street (Mykolaiv) (former headquarters of DonUgol Trust (Coal of Donbas)), Kharkiv, 1925
- 6 Alchevskykh Street, Kharkiv, 1928
- 9 Constitution Street, Kharkiv, 1925
- Kharkiv Red-and-Steel State Ukrainian Drama Theater (formerly the Chervonozavodsky Theater), Kharkiv, 1931
- Metalist Oblast Sports Complex, Kharkiv, 1926–1940
- Ministry of Culture, Kharkiv, 1931

=== Kyiv ===
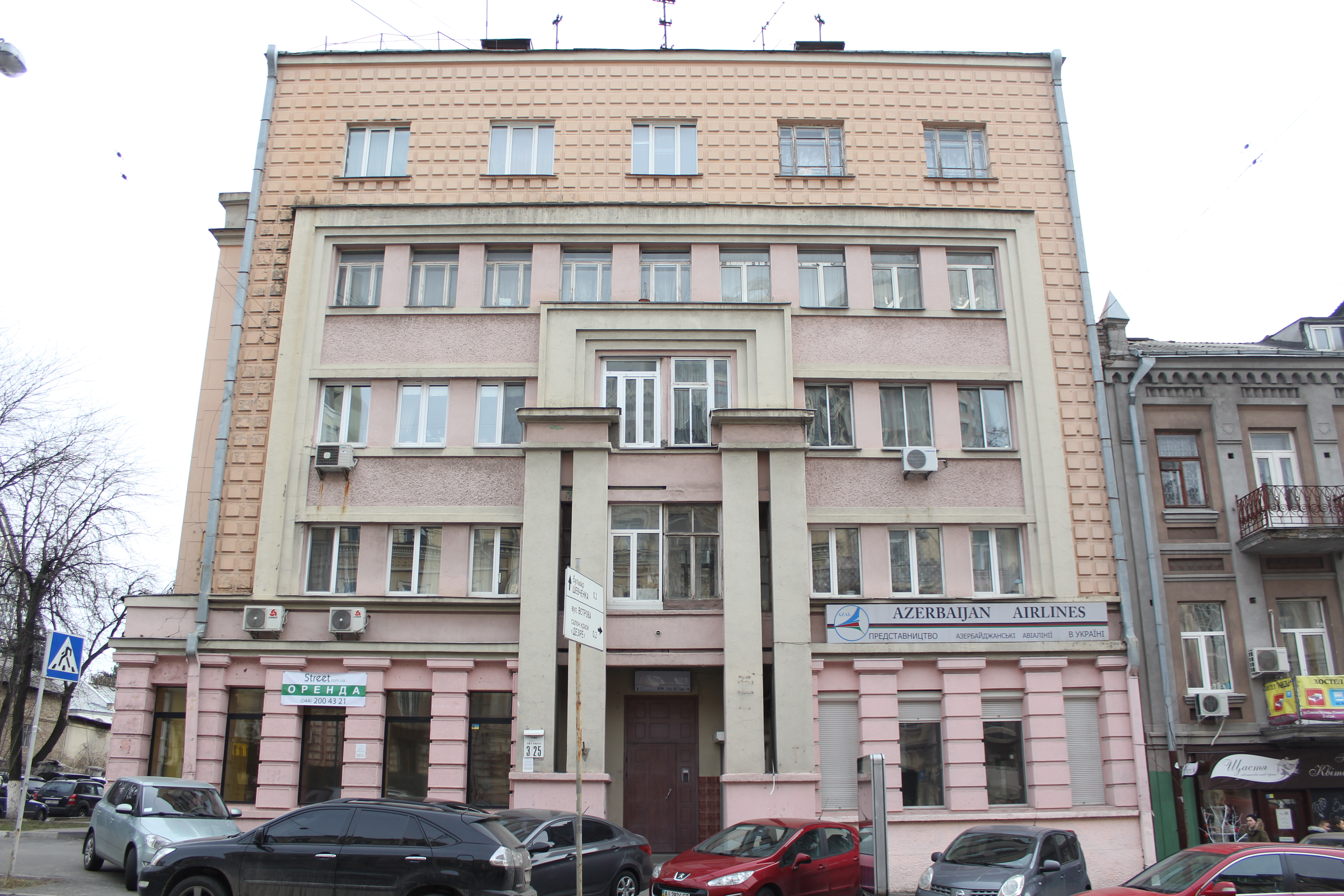
3/25 Symona Petliury Street, Kyiv, Ukraine

- 15/5 Instytutska Street, Kyiv, 1941
- 3/25 Symona Petliury Street, Kyiv
- 38 Bohdana Khmelnytskoho Street, Kyiv, 1936
- 7–9 Symona Petliury Street, Kyiv Λ
- 7/29 Tarasa Shevchenka Boulevard, Kyiv, 1912
- Crypt at Baikovo Cemetery, Kyiv
- 5a Pyrohova Street, Kyiv
- National Museum-Reserve of the Battle for Kyiv in 1943, Kyiv
- TsUM Kyiv, Kyiv

=== Lviv ===
- 10 Kovzhuna Street, Lviv, 1924
- 78 Konovaltsia Street, (now Heavenly B&B), Lviv, 1925
- 8 Karmanskoho Street, Lviv, 1923
- 9 Repina Street, Lviv
- Mazanczow House, Lviv, 1923
- Obrońców Cemetery, Lviv, 1924
- Tomb of Henryk Perier, Lviv
- Tomb of Komorowski and Stroński families at Lychakiv Cemetery, Lviv, 1929

== United Kingdom ==
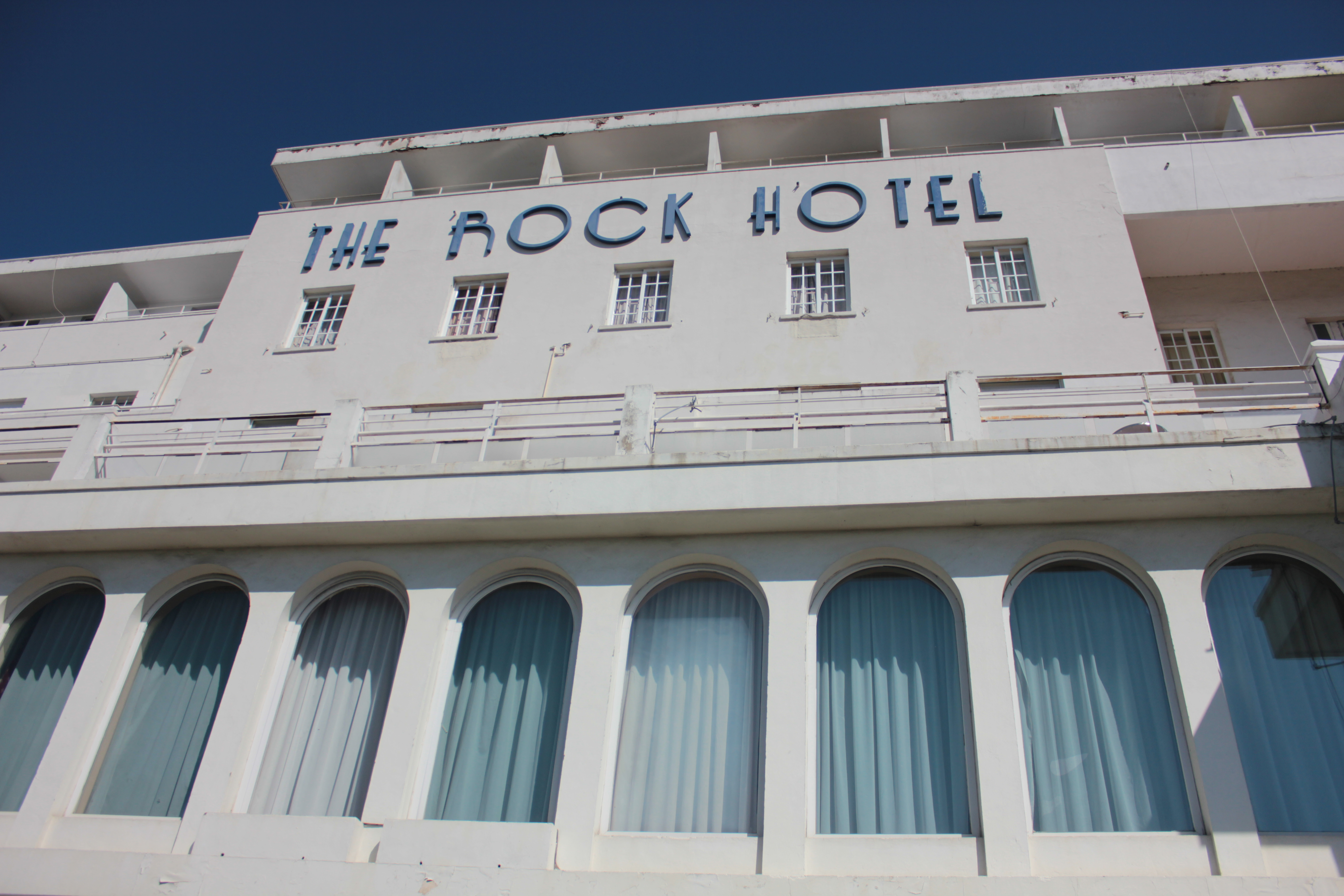
The Rock Hotel, Gibraltar, U.K.

- Ocean liners Ile de France, Normandie and RMS Queen Mary
- The Rock Hotel, Gibraltar, 1932

=== England ===
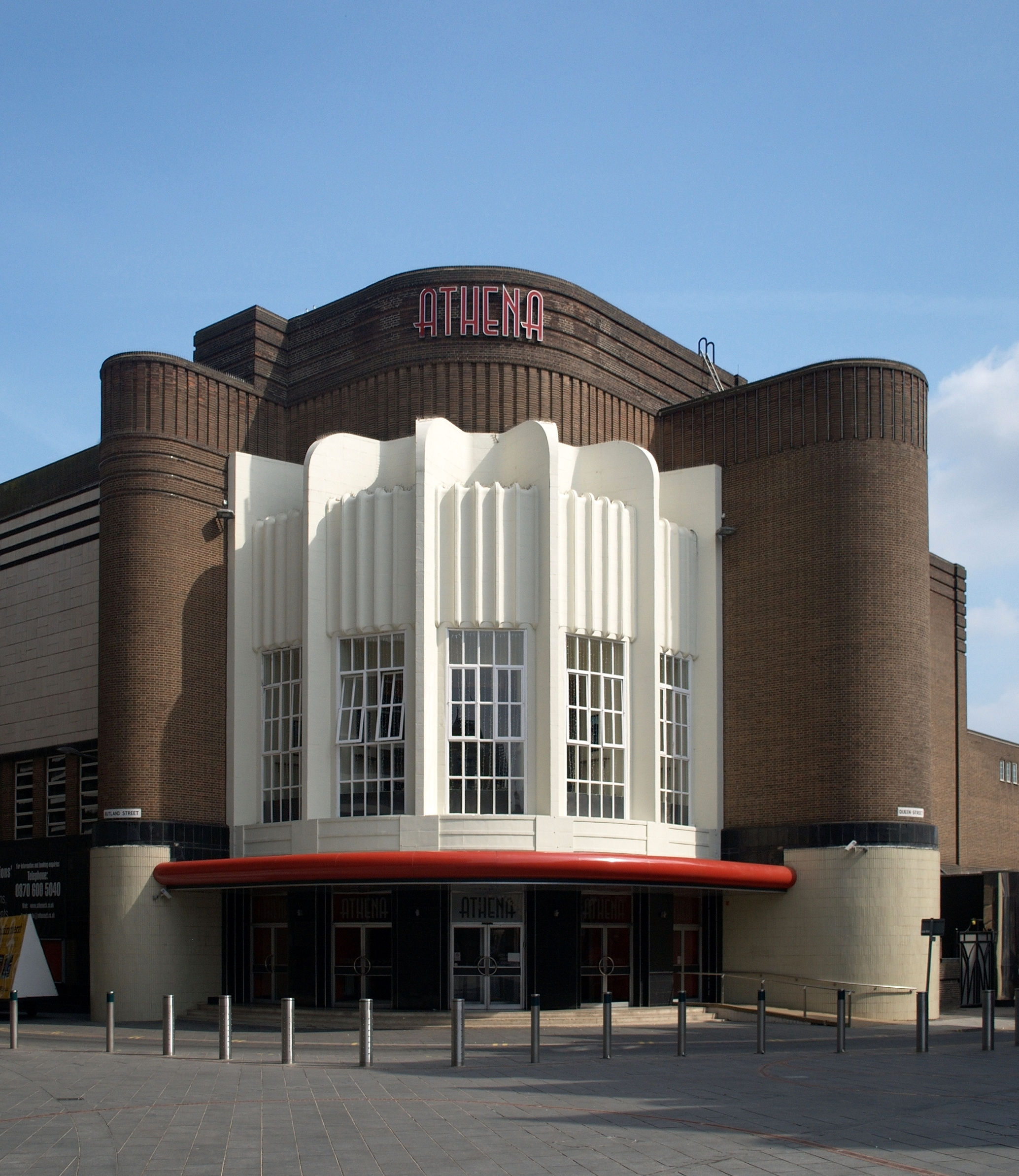
Leicester Athena, the former Odeon Cinema in Leicester, England

- 44-46 Park Street, Walsall, West Midlands, 1929
- 78 Derngate, Northampton, 1917
- Addington Health Centre, West Wickham, South London
- Arts Theatre, Cambridge, Cambridgeshire, 1936
- Beehive, Gatwick Airport, Crawley, West Sussex, 1936
- Bishopstone Railway Station, Seaford, East Sussex, 1938
- Bradford Odeon, Bradford, West Yorkshire, 1930
- Bristol Temple Meads railway station, Redcliffe, Bristol, 1935
- British Heart Foundation building, Congleton, Cheshire
- Brynmor Jones Library, University of Hull, Kingston upon Hull, Yorkshire, 1950s
- former Burton's, The Parade, Royal Leamington Spa, Warwickshire, 1930
- former Burton's (now Sainsbury's), Bristol
- former Burton's, Cheltenham, Gloucestershire
- former Burton's, Hanley, Stoke-on-Trent, Staffordshire
- Caxton Theatre, Grimsby, North East Lincolnshire
- Charters House, Sunningdale, Berkshire, 1938
- Chester Storyhouse, Cheshire, North West England, 1936
- The Chocolate Works of Terry's of York, York, 1926
- City Hall, Norwich (Charles Holloway James & Stephen Rowland Pierce), Norwich, East Anglia, 1938
- City Hall entertainment venue, Salisbury, Wiltshire, 1937
- Clipper Schooner pub, Great Yarmouth, Norfolk, 1938
- Coate Water Country Park, Swindon, Wiltshire
- Connaught Theatre, Worthing, West Sussex, 1914, 1935
- The Deco Cinema, Northampton, Northamptonshire, 1936
- The Deco Pub, Southsea, Portsmouth, Hampshire
- De La Warr Pavilion, Bexhill on Sea, East Sussex, 1935
- Druid Street Industrial (formerly Moore & Osbourne hosiery factory), Hinckley, Leicestershire, 1932
- former Electricity Board Showroom, Grimsby Road, Cleethorpes, Lincolnshire, 1937
- Ellen Terry Arts and Media Building, Coventry, West Midlands
- Embassy Theatre, Peterborough, Cambridgeshire, 1937
- Factory frontage (former Sheffield Forgemasters, British Steel), Sheffield, South Yorkshire
- Felixstowe Palace, Felixstowe, Suffolk
- Felixstowe Tourist Information Centre, Felixstowe, Suffolk
- Futurist Cinema, Basford, Nottingham, Nottinghamshire, 1937
- Globe Theatre, Stockton-on-Tees, Durham, 1938
- Grand National (roller coaster), Blackpool Pleasure Beach, Blackpool, Lancashire, 1935
- Hastings railway station, Hastings, East Sussex, 1931
- Holyoake Hall, Headington, Oxford, 1938
- Horsham railway station, Horsham, West Sussex, 1938
- Inorganic Chemistry Laboratory, University of Oxford
- John Haider Building, Bath Street, Hereford, Herefordshire
- Jubilee Pool, Penzance, Cornwall, South west England, 1935
- Kingsway Health Center, Widnes, Halton, Cheshire, 1939
- Leamington Spa railway station, Royal Leamington Spa, Warwickshire, 1939
- Leicester Athena (formerly Odeon Cinema), Leicester City Centre, Leicestershire, 1936
- Majestic Cinema, Bridgnorth, Shropshire, 1937
- Majestic Theatre, Darlington, Durham, 1932
- Manor Road Garage, East Preston, Littlehampton, West Sussex
- Marine Court, St. Leonards-on-Sea, Hastings, East Sussex, 1938
- Marine Villa, Shanklin, Isle of Wight
- Mecca Bingo Hall (formerly the Regal Cinema), Watford, 1913, 1932
- Middle Brook Centre (formerly Hope Church), Winchester, Hampshire
- Midland Hotel, Morecambe, Lancashire, 1933
- Never Turn Back pub, Caister-on-Sea, Norfolk, 1956
- former Odeon Cinema, Dudley, West Midlands, 1937
- former Odeon Cinema, Hanley, Stoke-on-Trent, Staffordshire
- Odeon Cinema, Hereford, Herefordshire, West Midlands
- Odeon Cinemas (now Funny Girls bar), Dickson Road, Blackpool, Lancashire, 1939
- Odeon Cinema, Wolverhampton, West Midlands, 1937
- Peterborough Lido, Peterborough, Cambridgeshire, 1936
- Queen's Court, Bristol, 1937
- Regal Cinema, Evesham, 1932
- former The Regal Cinema and Gala Bingo Hall, Cowley Road, Oxford, 1937
- Ritz Cinema, Nuneaton, Nuneaton and Bedworth, Warwickshire, 1937
- former Rivoli Picture House, Sandown, Isle of Wight
- San Remo Towers, Boscombe, Bournemouth, Christchurch and Poole
- Savoy Cinema, Nottingham, Nottinghamshire, 1935
- Seaton Carew bus station, Hartlepool, Durham, North East England, 1930s
- Sheffield Central Library, Sheffield, South Yorkshire, 1929
- Showroom Cinema, Sheffield, South Yorkshire, 1936
- Shrubs Wood, Chalfont St. Giles, Buckinghamshire, 1934
- Southfields Branch Library, Leicester, Leicestershire, 1939
- Southampton Civic Centre, Southampton, Hampshire, 1932–1937
- St. Barnabas Library, Leicester, Leicestershire, 1937
- St. Hugh's Church, Scunthorpe, North Lincolnshire, 1939
- Stoke Abbott Court, Worthing, West Sussex
- Superdrug building, Macclesfield, Cheshire
- Sywell Aerodome, Sywell, Northamptonshire
- Westcliffe Buildings, Barton on Sea, Hampshire
- Winter Gardens, Blackpool, Lancashire, 1878, 1920
- Worthing Pier, Worthing, West Sussex, 1935
- Yacht Inn St. Austell Brewery Ales, Penzance, Cornwall

==== Birmingham ====
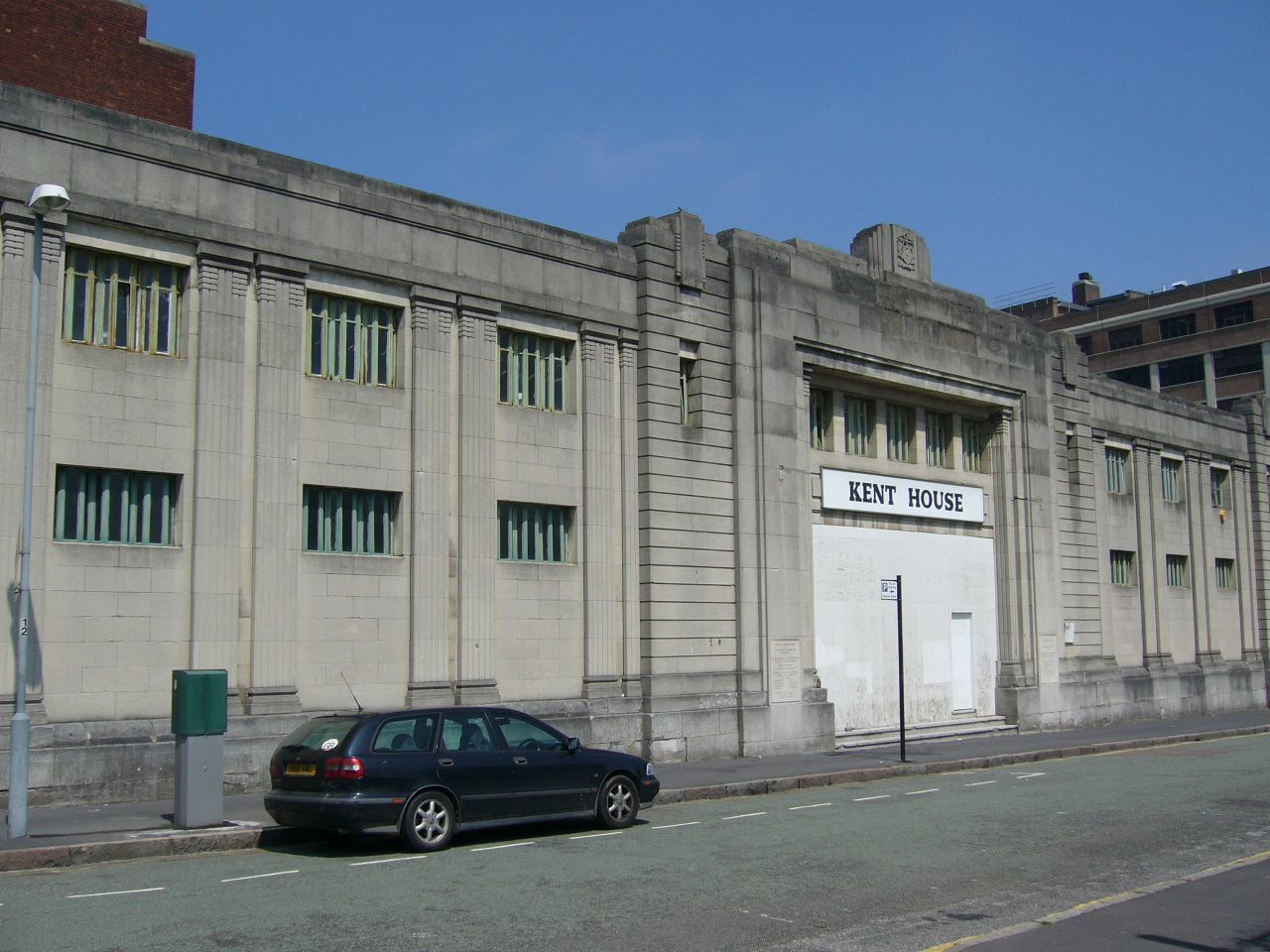
Kent House, formerly Kent Street Baths, Birmingham, England

- The Alexandra, Birmingham, 1938
- Barber Institute of Fine Arts, Birmingham, West Midlands, 1939
- former Burton's, Erdington, Birmingham, West Midlands
- Clifton Bingo (former Odeon Cinema Perry Barr), Birmingham, 1938
- Elmdon Building, Birmingham International Airport, Birmingham
- Royal Cinema (former Odeon Cinema), Sutton Coldfield, 1936
- former Mothers Club, Erdington, Birmingham,
- General Electric Company, Aston, Birmingham, 1920
- Golden Eagle, Birmingham, 1930s (demolished)
- Harborne Baths, Birmingham, 1923
- Kent House (formerly Kent Street Baths), Birmingham, 1933
- Medical School, University of Birmingham, 1938
- Oak Cinema, Selly Oak, Birmingham, 1923 (demolished)
- Odeon Cinema, Kingstanding, Birmingham, 1962
- Petersfield Court, Hall Green, Birmingham, 1937
- former Times Furnishing Company (now Waterstone's), Birmingham, 1938

==== Brighton ====
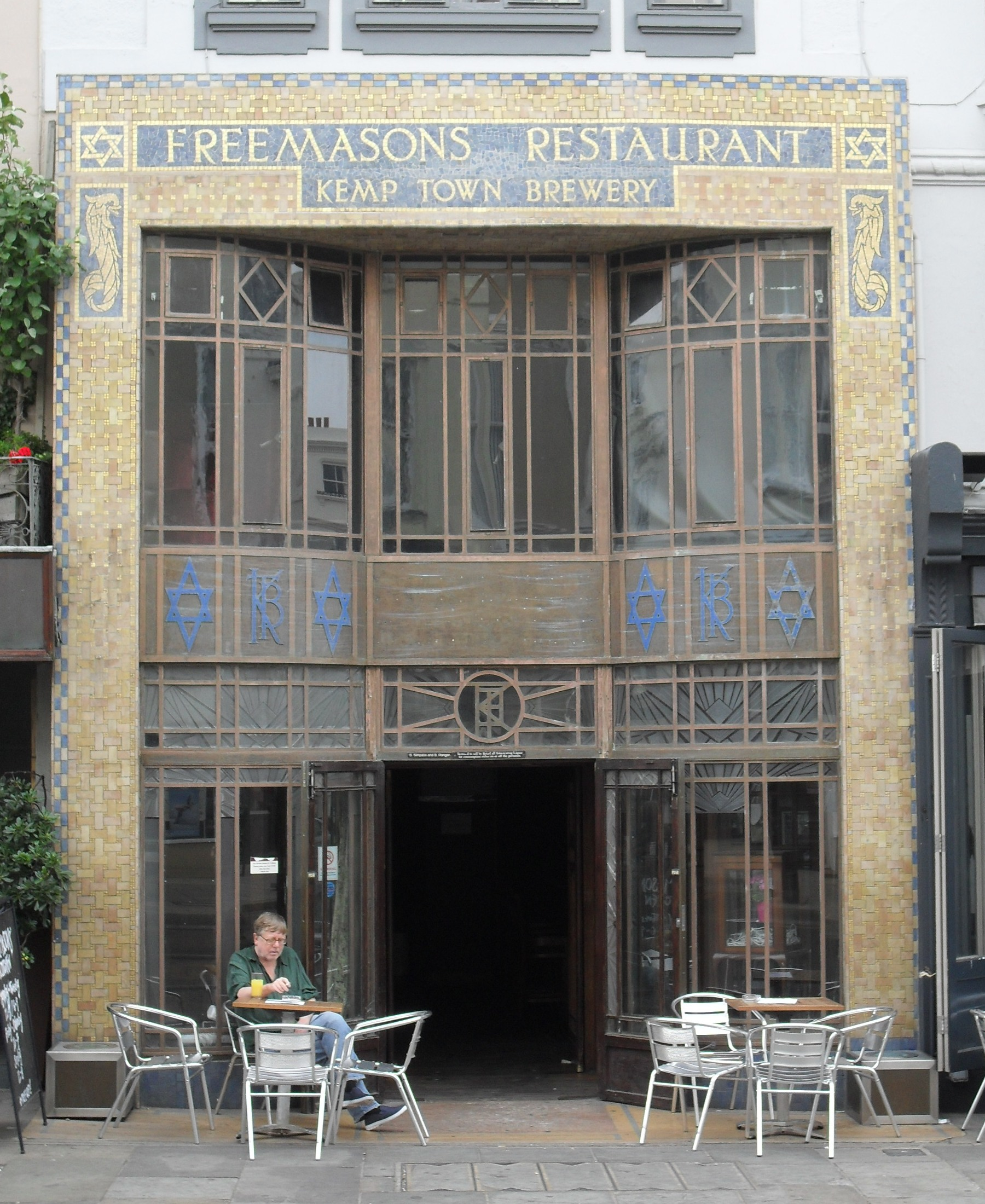
Freemasons Inn and Restaurant, 39 Western Road, Brunswick Town, Hove, City of Brighton and Hove, East Sussex, England: restaurant façade

- ABC Cinema, Brighton, East Sussex, 1930 (now Grosvenor Casino)
- Brighton Marina, Brighton
- Embassy Court, Brighton, East Sussex, 1935
- Freemasons Tavern and Brewery, Hove, Brighton and Hove, East Sussex, 1928
- Marine Gate, Brighton, 1939
- Patcham Clock Tower, Patcham, Brighton and Hove, 1930s
- Saltdean Lido, Brighton, 1938
- Van Alen Building, Brighton, 2001
- White Cliffs Cafe, Brighton, 1937

==== Cumbria ====
- former Burton's, Whitehaven, Cumbria
- The Bus Station, Whitehaven, Cumbria, 1931
- Eden Rural Foyer Sfere (formerly Regent Cinema), Penrith, Cumbria, 1933 Endymion House, Millbeck, Keswich, Cumbria, 1930s
- John Whinnerah Institute, Barrow-in-Furness, Cumbria, 1938
- Roxy Cinema (now Hollywood Nightclub), Barrow-in-Furness, Cumbria, 1937
- Workington Opera House, Workington, Cumbria, 1930

==== Dorset ====
- Bournemouth Daily Echo building, 1932
- Immanuel Church, Southbourne, Dorset
- Odeon Landsdowne, Bournemouth, Dorset, 1937
- Pier Bandstand, Weymouth Bay, Dorset, 1939
- Playhouse & Galaxy Cinema (formerly Palace Court Theatre), Bournemouth, Dorset, 1931
- Plaza Cinema, Dorchester, Dorset, 1933
- Poole Civic Centre, Poole, Dorset, 1932
- Premier Inn, Bournemouth, Dorset
- Roxy Cinema, Bournemouth, Dorset, 1911, 1938
- Westover Super Cinema, Bournemouth, Dorset, 1937

==== Devon ====
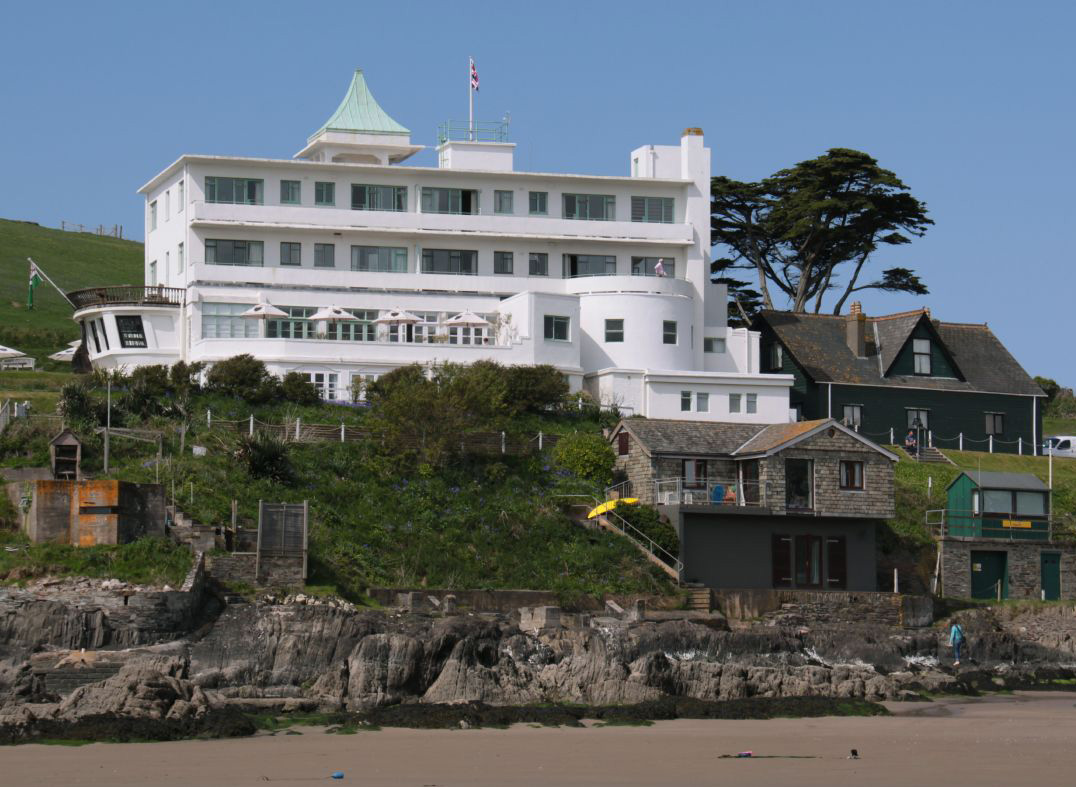
Burgh Island Hotel, Devon, England

- Burgh Island Hotel, Burgh Island, Devon, 1927
- Casa del Rio, Newton Ferrers, South Hams, Devon, 1936
- Central Cinema, Barnstaple, North Devon, 1931
- Holsworthy Amateur Theatre Society HATS Theatre, Holsworthy, Devon, 1947
- House of Fraser (formerly Dingle's Department Store), Plymouth, Devon
- Pearl Assurance House, Plymouth, Devon
- Sunpark, Higher Brixham, Devon, 1935
- Tinside Lido, Plymouth, Devon, 1935
- Zenith House (formerly Motor Mecca, Barton Motor Company, and Kastners Garage) Exeter, Devon, 1933

==== Hertfordshire ====
- former Addis Factory, Hertford, Hertfordshire
- Broadway Cinema, Letchworth, Hertfordshire, 1936
- Comet Public House, Hatfield, Welwyn Hatfield, Hertfordshire
- Essoldo Court apartments (formerly Essoldo Watford Theatre), Watford, 1913, 1932
- Odyssey Cinema, St Albans (Percival Blow, James Martin Hatfield, Kemp & Tasker) St. Albans, Hertfordshire, 1931
- The Rex Cinema (David Evelyn Nye) Berkhamsted, Hertfordshire, 1938
- West Herts College, Watford, Hertfordshire, 1938

==== Essex ====
- Century Cinema, Clacton-on-Sea, Essex, 1936
- Cliffs Pavilion, Westcliff-on-Sea, Essex, 1930s
- Hotel Monico, Canvey Island, Essex, 1938
- Labworth Cafe, Canvey Island, Essex, 1932
- Liquor Lounge, Clacton-on-Sea, Essex
- Odeon Cinema, Colchester, Essex
- St. George's Church, Brentwood, Essex, 1931

==== Kent ====
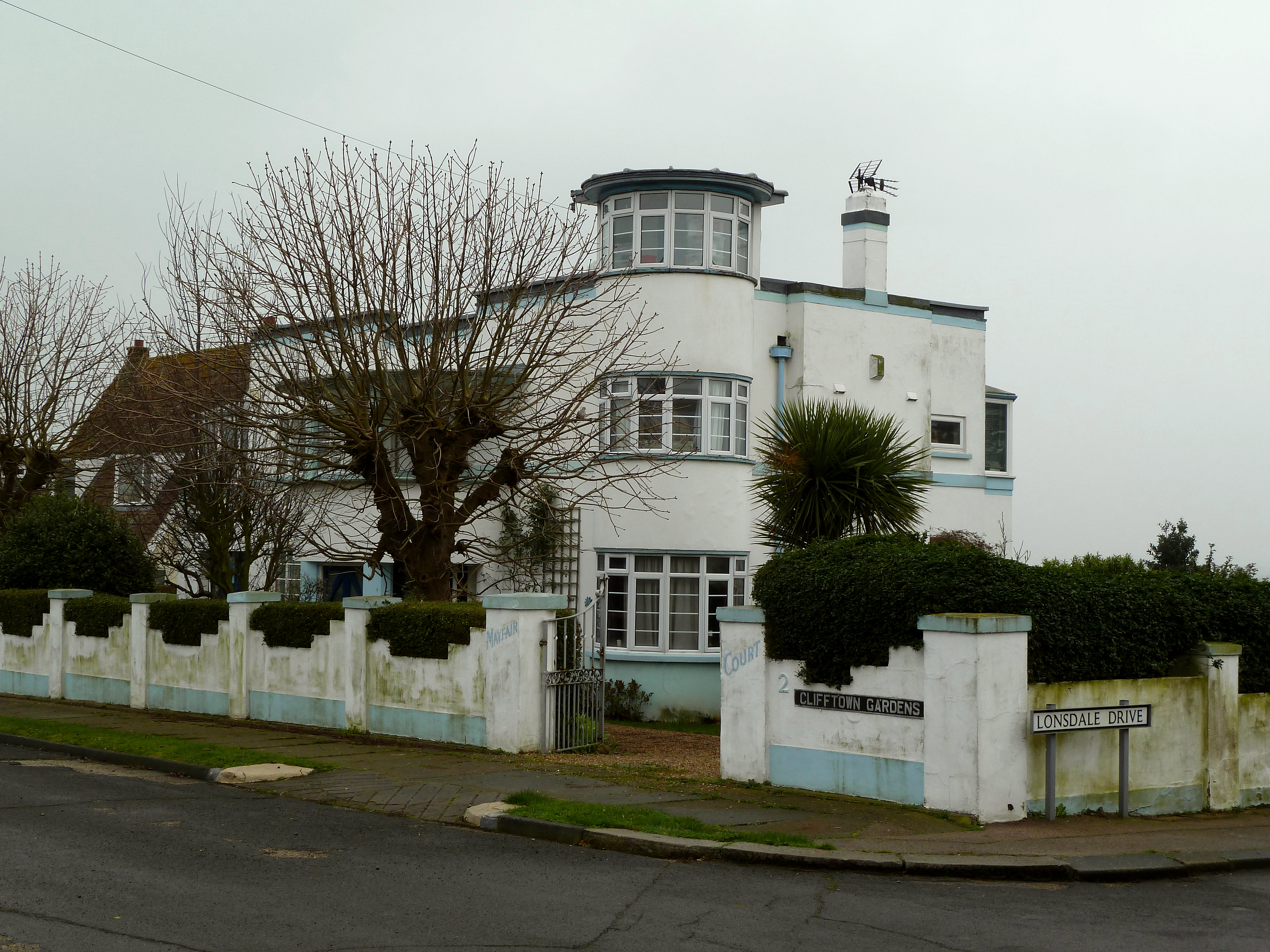
Mayfair Court, Clifftown Gardens, Herne Bay, Kent, England

- Dreamland Margate Cinema, Margate, Kent, 1923
- Halifax Bank (formerly National Westminster Bank), Chatham, Medway, Kent
- Margate railway station, Margate, Thanet, Kent, 1926
- Mayfair Court, Clifftown Gardens, Herne Bay, Kent, 1935
- RAF West Malling Air Traffic Control Tower, Tonbridge and Malling, Kent
- Sun Trap House, Grand Drive, Herne Bay, Kent, 1935
- Thanet School of Art (Kent Education Committee), Margate, Thanet, Kent, 1928
- Thimblemill Library, Smethwick, Sandwell, West Midlands, 1937
- W.T. Henley Building (Cable Works), Northfleet, Gravesham, Kent
- White Cliffs, St. Margaret's-at-Cliffe, Kent

==== Leeds ====
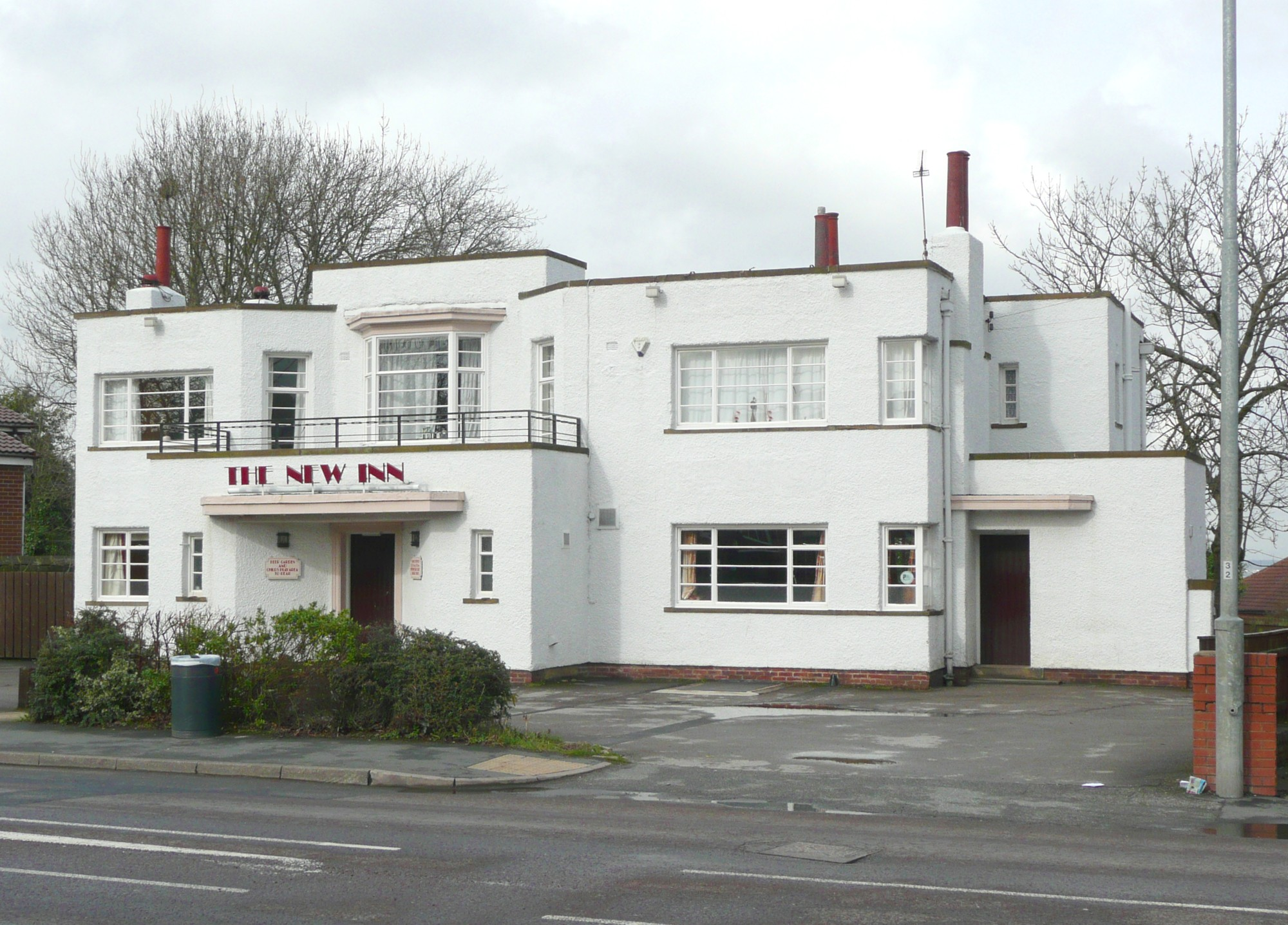
The New Inn, Leeds, England

- ABC Cinema, Wakefield, West Yorkshire, 1935
- Electronic and Electrical Engineering Building, University of Leeds, Leeds, West Yorkshire
- Institute of Pathology, St. George's Road, Leeds, West Yorkshire
- Leeds General Infirmary, Brotherton Wing, Leeds, West Yorkshire, 1940
- Leeds Media Centre, Leeds, West Yorkshire, 1934
- The New Inn, Gildersome, Leeds, West Yorkshire, 1934
- Parkinson Building, University of Leeds, Leeds, 1951
- Queens Hotel, Leeds Leeds, West Yorkshire, 1937
- Vake Cinema, Mirfield, West Yorkshire, 1939

==== Liverpool ====
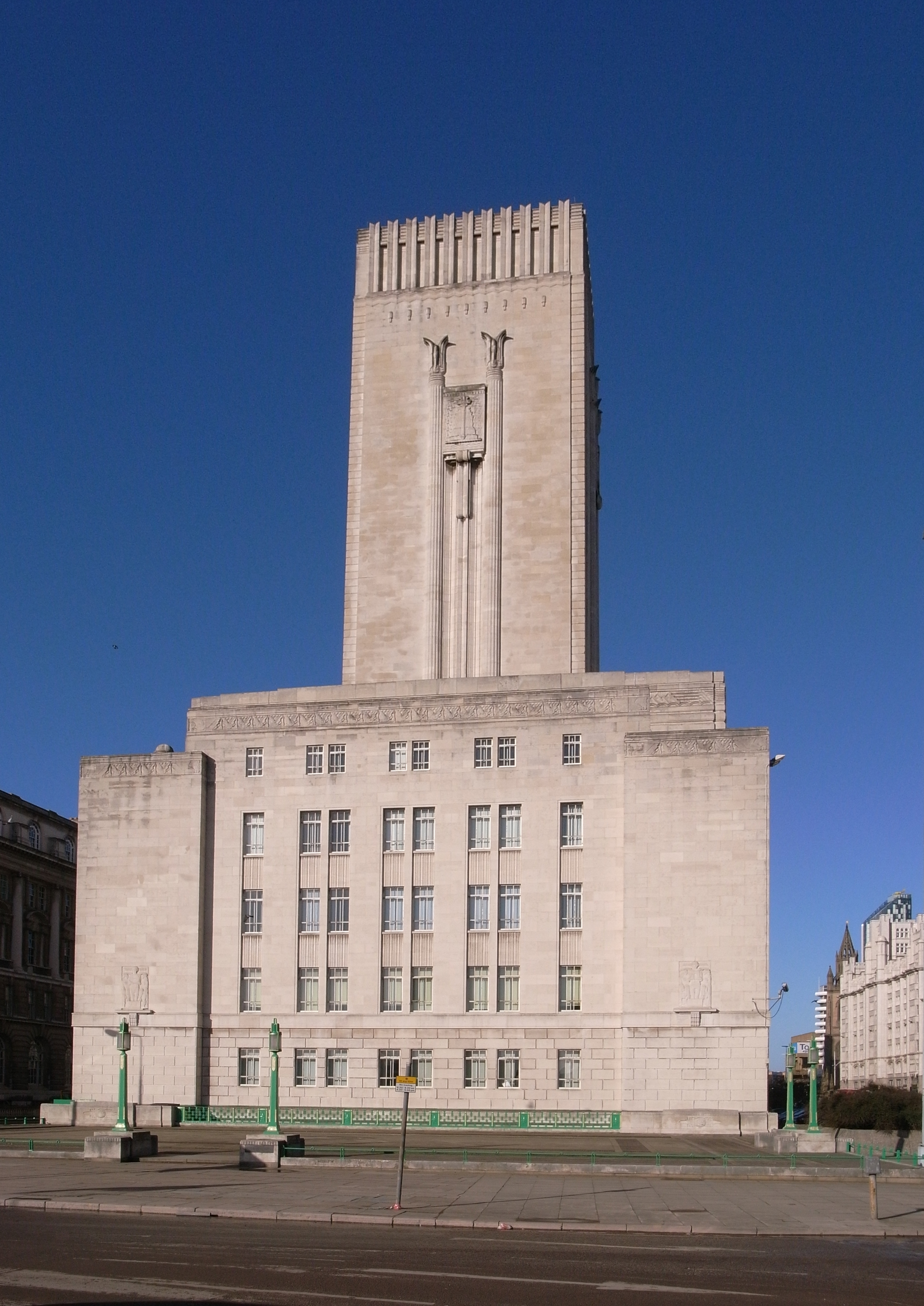
George's Dock Building, Pier Head, Liverpool, England. Offices and ventilation shaft for the Queensway Tunnel.

- ABC Cinema (former Forum Cinema), Liverpool, 1931
- Blacklers Department Store, Liverpool, 1941, 1953
- Bryant and May match factory in Speke, Liverpool
- Crowne Plaza Liverpool John Lennon Airport Hotel, (former Air Control Tower and terminal), Liverpool, 1930s
- David Lloyd Sports Centre, Liverpool
- Granada Cinema, Dovecot, Liverpool, 1932
- Greenbank Drive Synagogue, Sefton Park, Liverpool, 1936
- Harold Cohen Library, University of Liverpool, Liverpool, 1938
- Liverpool Meat and Fish Market, Tue Brook, 1931
- Littlewoods Pools building, Liverpool, 1938
- Old Co-operative Building (now student housing), Liverpool, 1937
- Philharmonic Hall, Liverpool, 1939
- Queensway Tunnel, River Mersey, Liverpool to Birkenhead, 1934
- Ritz Roller Rink, Liverpool, 1937
- Royal Court Theatre, Liverpool, 1938
- Skyways House (headquarters of Shop Direct Group), Old Terminal, John Lennon Airport, Liverpool, 1930s

==== London ====
- 1 and 3 Hill Crescent Coldblow, Bexley, London
- 2, 4, and 6 Valencia Road, Stanmore, Harrow, London, 1932
- 14 The Avenue Home, Hampton, Richmond upon Thames, London
- Adhesive Specialities Ltd Building, Ladywell, Lewisham
- Alaska Building, Bermondsey, Southwark, London, 1930s
- Arnos Grove tube station, Arnos Grove, Enfield, 1932
- Arsenal Stadium (East and West Stands), Highbury, Islington, London (Claude Waterlow Ferrier, 1932–36)
- Balmoral Court flats, South Norwood Hill, Croydon
- Broadway Theatre, Catford, Lewisham, London, 1932
- Bromley Picturehouse (formerly Odeon Theatre), Bromley, London, 1936
- Carlton Cinema, Essex Road, Islington, London, 1922
- Chessington North railway station, Kingston upon Thames, London, 1939
- Chilterns Apartments, Sutton, London
- Cholmley Lodge, Haringay, London, 1934
- Colliers Wood tube station, Colliers Wood, Merton, 1926
- Coronet pub and former cinema, Holloway, Islington, London
- Croydon Airport, Croydon, 1928
- Dagenham Roundhouse, Dagenham, Barking and Dagenham, London, 1936
- De Bohun Primary School, Southgatem Enfield, London, 1936
- Eastcote tube station, Eastcote, Hillingdon, London, 1939
- Elm Park Court, Harrow, London, 1936
- Embassy Cinema (Mayfair Venue), Chadwell Heath, Redbridge, London, 1934
- Forest Croft and Taymount Grange, Forest Hill, Lewisham, London, 1937
- Gants Hill tube station, Ilford, Redbridge, London, 1947
- Gaumont State Cinema, (George Coles), Kilburn, Brent, London, 1937
- The Grampians, Shepherd's Bush, Hammersmith and Fulham, London, 1937
- Grange Park Methodist Church, Grange Park, Enfield, 1938
- Gwynne House, Whitechapel, Tower Hamlets, London, 1938
- Hammersmith Apollo, Hammersmith, Hammersmith and Fulham, London, 1932
- Hillingdon Sports and Leisure Complex, Uxbridge, Hillingdon, London, 1935
- Ibex House, Tower Hamlets, London, 1937
- Islington Assembly Hall, Islington, London, 1930
- Isokon building Apartment Building, (Wells Coates), Lawn Road, Hampstead, London, 1933–34
- Ivory Lounge, Bexleyheath, Bexley, London
- Kingsley Court, Willesden Green, Brent, London, 1933
- Lichfield Court, Richmond, Richmond upon Thames, London, 1935
- Limehouse: The Mission, Tower Hamlets, London, 1923
- Millennium Mills, West Silvertown, Newham, London, 1934
- Mortlake Crematorium, Kew, Richmond upon Thames, London, 1939
- Odeon Cinema, Richmond upon Thames, London, 1930
- Oxo Tower, South Bank, Southwark, London, 1929
- Pinner Court, Harrow, London, 1935
- Poplar Baths, Poplar, Tower Hamlets, London, 1933
- Poplar OLD Town Hall, Tower Hamlets, London
- Prince's Tower, Rotherhithem, Southwark, London, 1980s
- Queen Elizabeth II Stadium, Enfield, London, 1953
- Rainbow Theatre (formerly Astoria Theatre), Finsbury Park, Haringey, London, 1930
- Randalls of Uxbridge department store, Uxbridge, Hillingdon, London, 1938
- Redbridge tube station, Ilford, Redbridge, London, 1947
- Rex Cinema, Bethnal Green, Tower Hamlets, London, 1913, 1938
- Richmond station, Richmond, Richmond upon Thames, London, 1937
- Rio Cinema, Dalston, Hackey, London, 1909, 1933
- Royal Masonic Hospital, Ravenscourt Park, Hammersmith, London, 1933
- Secombe Theatre, Sutton, London, 1937, 1983
- South Wimbledon tube station, Wimbledon, Merton, London, 1926
- Southgate tube station, Southgate, Enfield, London, 1933
- Springfield Court flats, Springfield Gardens, Upminster, Havering, London, 1930s
- St. Helier Hospital, Sutton, Carshalton, London, 1934
- St Olaf House (Harry Stuart Goodhart-Rendel), London Bridge, Southwark, London 1929–1931
- St. Patrick's Church, Barking, Barking and Dagenham, London, 1940
- Surbiton railway station, Surbiton, Kingston upon Thames, London, 1937
- Tabard House, Richmond upon Thames, London
- Time Building, Harrow, London
- Towers Cinema, Hornchurch, Havering, London, 1935 (demolished)
- Troxy Cinema, Stepney, Tower Hamlets, London, 1932
- Uxbridge tube station, Uxbridge, Hillington, London, 1938
- Waltham Forest Town Hall, Wathamstow, Waltham Forest, London, 1941
- Walthamstow Stadium, Waltham Forest, London, 1933
- Wembley Fire Station - London Fire Brigade, Wembley, Brent, London, 1937
- William Booth Memorial Training College, Denmark Hill, Southwark, 1929
- Yardleys Box Factory, Stratford, Greater London, 1937
- Zoroastrian Centre (former Grosvenor Cinema, Ace Cinema), Harrow, London

===== London - Borough of Hounslow =====
- Boston Manor tube station, Hounslow, London, 1932
- Coty Cosmetics factory, Brentford, 1932
- Firestone Tyre Factory, Brentford, Hounslow, London, 1928
- Gillette Corner, Hounslow, London, 1930s
- Golden Mile, Brentford, London, 1925
- Hartington Court building, Chiswick, London
- Hounslow West tube station, Hounslow, London, 1931
- JCDecaux (former Currys Head Office), Brentford, Hounslow, 1936
- Osterley tube station, Osterley, Hounslow, London, 1925
- Pyrene Company Building, Brentford, London, 1930
- Wallis House (now Barratt building), Brentford, 1936, 1942

===== London – Borough of Barnet =====
- Christ the King, Cockfosters, Barnet, London, 1930
- East Finchley tube station, East Finchley, Barnet, London, 1939
- Everyman Cinema Muswell Hill (formerly the Odeon Cinema), Muswell Hill, Barnet, London, 1936
- Gaumont Finchley, North Finchley, Barnet, London, 1937
- Grand Arcade, North Finchley, Barnet, London, 1930s
- John Keble Church, Mill Hill, Barnet, London, 1936
- Phoenix Cinema, East Finchley, Barnet, London, 1912, 1924

===== London – Borough of Camden =====
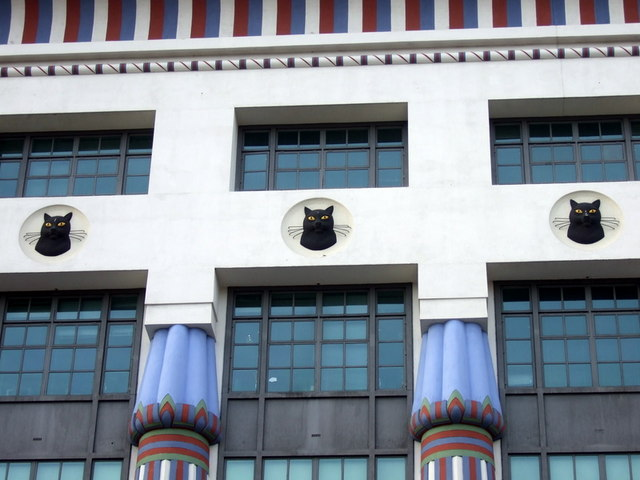
Cat frieze on Carreras building (These decorative cats heads running along the facade of the old Carreras factory, now Greater London House, resemble ordinary domestic moggies rather more that the monumental replicas that flank the main doorway) Camden, London, England.

- 66 Frognal, Camden, London, 1938
- Cambridge Theatre, Camden, London, 1930
- Carreras Cigarette Factory (Arcadia Works), (M.E and O.H Collins with A.G Porri), Camden, London, 1928
- former Burton's, Camden High Street, London
- Cohen House, Chelsea, London, 1936
- Derry & Toms Department store, Kensington and Chelsea, London, 1860, 1933
- Daimler Car Hire Garage (Frames Coach Station), Bloomsbury, Camden, London, 1931
- Freemasons' Hall, London, Camden, London, 1933
- Hillfield Court, Belsize Park, Camden, London, 1934
- Isokon Flats, Hampstead, Camden, London, 1934
- London Forum (formerly the Town & Country Club), Kentish Town, Camden, London, 1934
- London School of Hygiene & Tropical Medicine, Bloomsbury, Camden, London, 1924
- Northwood Hall, Highgate, Camden, London, 1935
- Open Space Theatre, Camden, London, 1968
- Paramount Court, Tottenham Court Road, Camden, London
- Saville Theatre (now Odeon Covent Garden), Camden, London, 1931
- Senate House, Bloomsbury, Camden, London, 1937
- Sun House, Frognal, Hampstead, Camden, London, 1935
- Tavistock Court, Endsleigh Place, Camden, London
- Trinity Court, Gray’s Inn Road, Camden, London, 1935
- Waitrose (former John Barnes department store), Camden, London

===== London- Borough of Ealing =====
- 62 The Mall, Ealing, London
- Acton Town tube station, Acton, Ealing, London, 1932
- Chiswick Park tube station, Chiswick, Ealing, London, 1932
- Ealing Common tube station, Ealing, London, 1931
- Hanwell Clock Tower, Hanwell, Ealing, London, 1937
- Hoover Building, (Wallis, Gilbert and Partners), Perivale, Ealing, London, 1933–1938
- Longfield House, Ealing, London
- Park Royal tube station, Ealing, London, 1931
- Tudor Rose nightclub, Southall, Ealing London, 1910, 1929

===== London – Borough of Greenwich =====
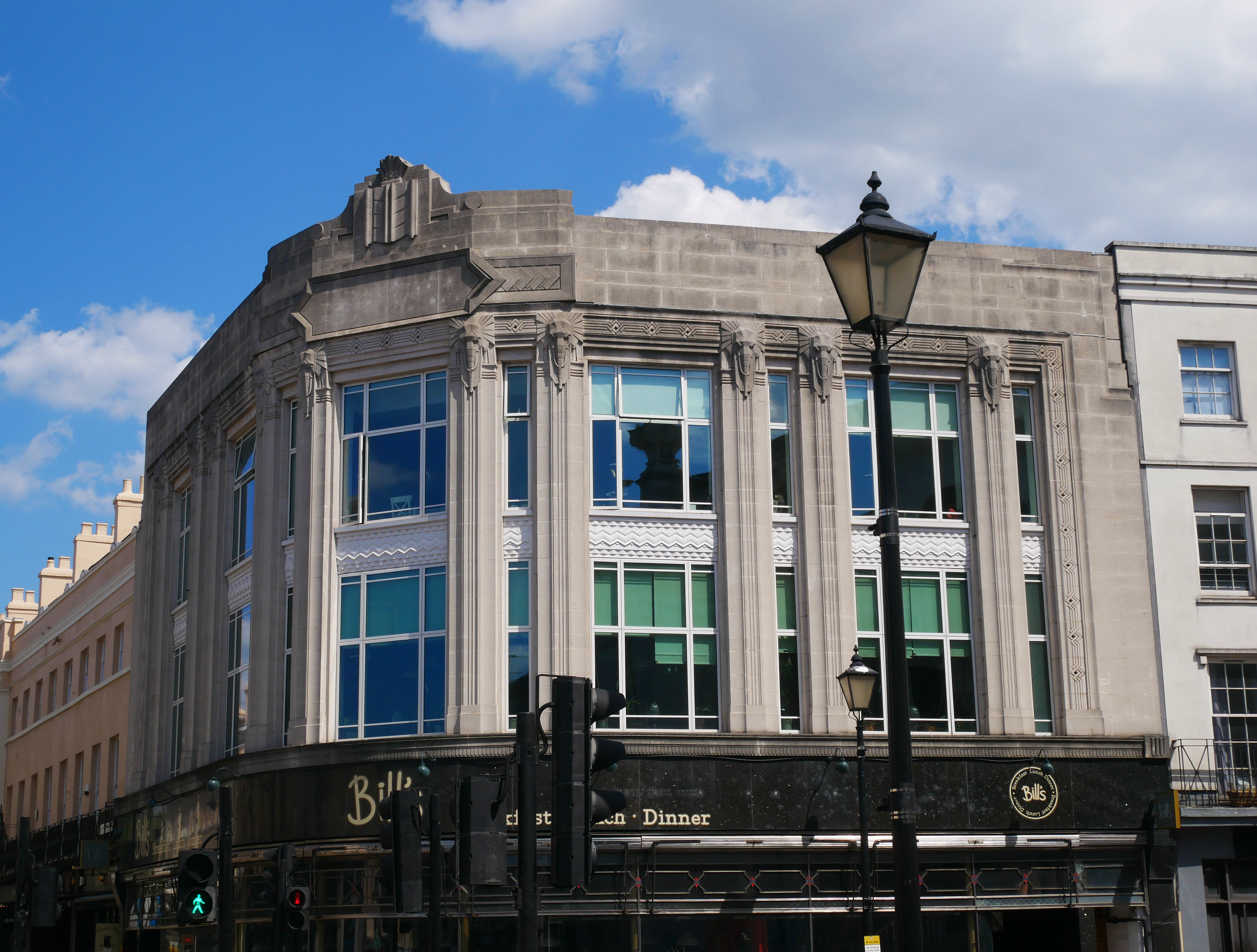
former Burton's 13 Nelson Road, Greenwich, London, England

- former Burton's Nelson Road (now Bill's Restaurant), Greenwich
- Coronet Cinema, Eltham, Greenwich, 1936
- Eltham Palace extension, (John Seeley & Paul Paget), Eltham, Greenwich, London, 1933
- Meridian House (former Greenwich Town Hall), Greenwich, London, 1939
- New Wine Church (formerly Woolwich Odeon), Woolwich, Greenwich, London, 1937
- former RACS Department Store, Woolwich, Greenwich, London

===== London – Borough of Kensington and Chelsea =====
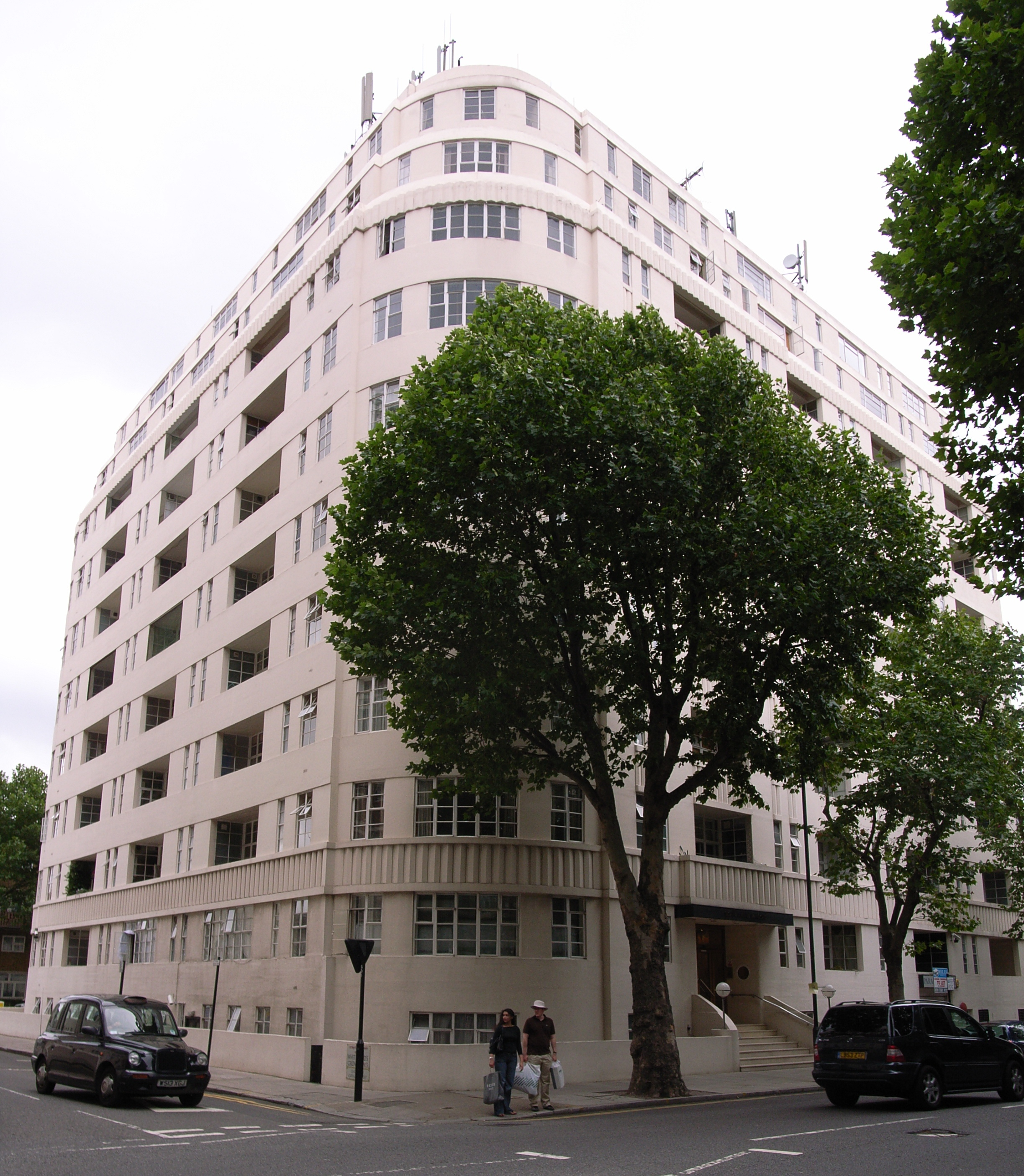
Sloane Avenue Mansions, Chelsea, London

- Barkers of Kensington, Kensington and Chelsea, London, 1926
- Bluebird Garage, Chelsea, Kensington and Chelsea, London, 1923
- Derry & Toms Department store, Kensington and Chelsea, London, 1860, 1933
- Earls Court Exhibition Centre, Earl's Court, Kensington and Chelsea, London, 1937
- Peter Jones (department store), Chelsea, Kensington and Chelsea, London, 1936
- Kensington High Street, Kensington, Kensington and Chelsea, London
- Nell Gwynn House, Chelsea, Kensington and Chelsea, London, 1937
- Olympia Grand, West Kensington, Kensington and Chelsea, London, 1886
- Sloane Avenue Mansions, Chelsea, Kensington and Chelsea, London, 1933

===== London – Borough of Lambeth =====
- Balham Odeon, Clapham, Lambeth, London, 1938
- Brockwell Lido, Brockwell Park, Herne Hill, Lambeth, London, 1937
- Burton's men's clothing, Streatham, Lambeth, London, 1932
- Clapham South Tube Station, Clapham, Lambeth, London, 1937
- Corner Fielde, Streatham, Lambeth, London, 1937
- The High, Streatham, Lambeth, London, 1937
- Leigh Hall, Streatham, Lambeth, London, 1936
- Maritime House, Clapham Old Town, Lambeth, London, 1939
- O2 Brixton Academy, Brixton, Lambeth, London, 1929
- Oaklands Estate, Clapham, Lambeth, London, 1936
- Okeavor Manor, Clapham, Lambeth, London, 1935
- Pullman Court, Streatham, Lambeth, London, 1935
- Sharman's (now WHSmith and a Post Office), Streatham, Lambeth, London, 1929
- South London Press Building (now an apartment building), Streatham, Lambeth, London, 1939
- Streathleigh Court, Streatham, Lambeth, London, 1937
- Sunlight Laundry, (F E Simpkins) Acre Lane, Brixton, Lambeth, South London, 1937
- Trinity Close, Clapham, Lambeth, London, 1936
- Windsor Court, Clapham, Lambeth, London, 1936
- Woodlands Building, Clapham, Lambeth, London, 1935

===== London – Borough of Wandsworth =====
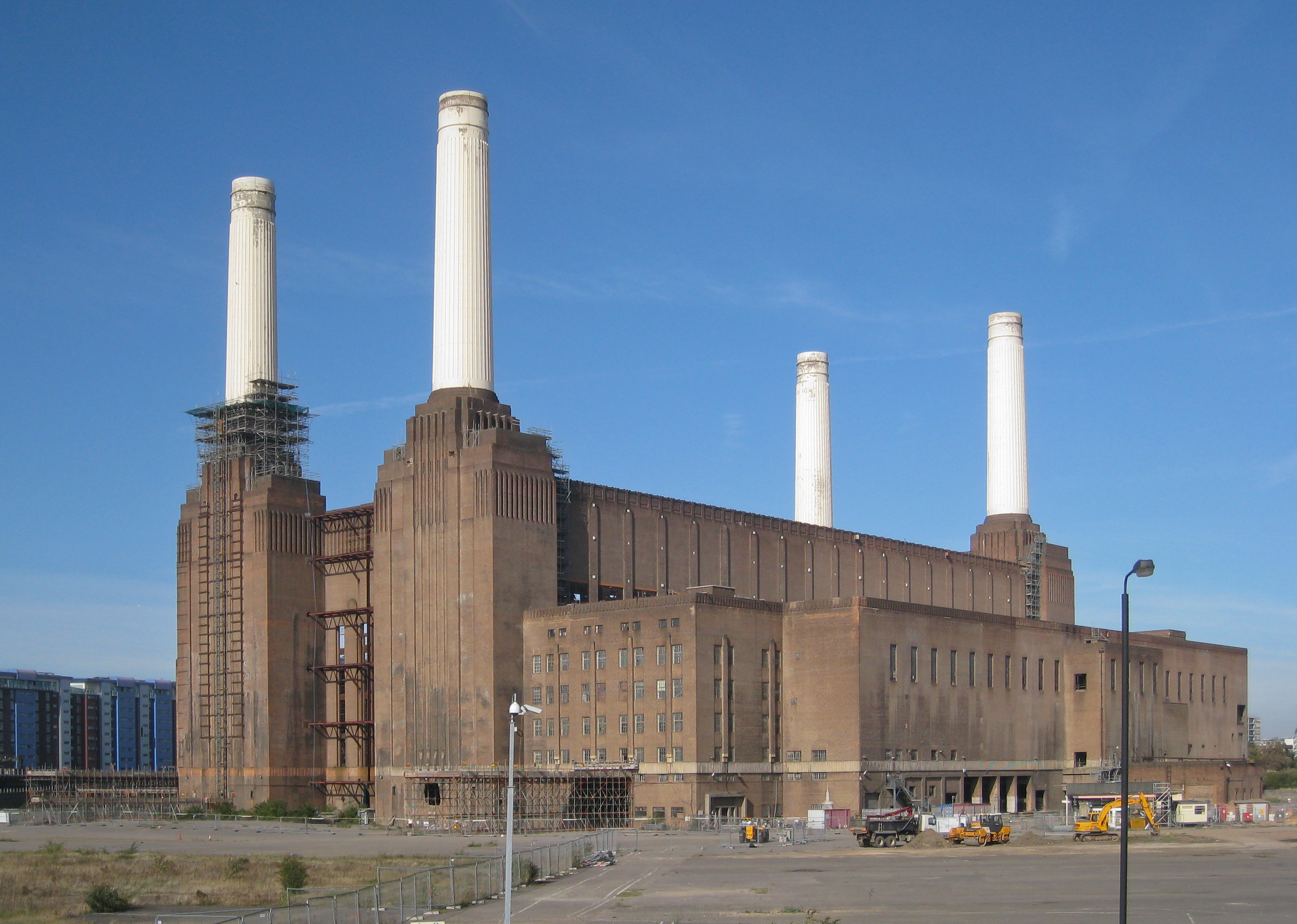
Battersea Power Station, Battersea, London

- Balham station, Balham, Wandsworth, London, 1926
- Battersea power station, Battersea, Wandsworth, London, 1929, 1945
- Clapham South tube station, Clapham, Wandsworth, 1926
- Du Cane Court, Balham, Wandsworth, 1937
- Granada Cinema, Tooting, Wandsworth, London, 1931
- Hightrees House, Clapham, Nightingale Lane, London, 1938
- Lakeside Cafe, Battersea Park
- Tooting Bec tube station, Tooting, Wandsworth, London, 1926
- Tooting Broadway tube station, Tooting, Wandsworth, London, 1926
- former Tooting Police Station, Tooting, Wandsworth, London

===== London – City of London =====
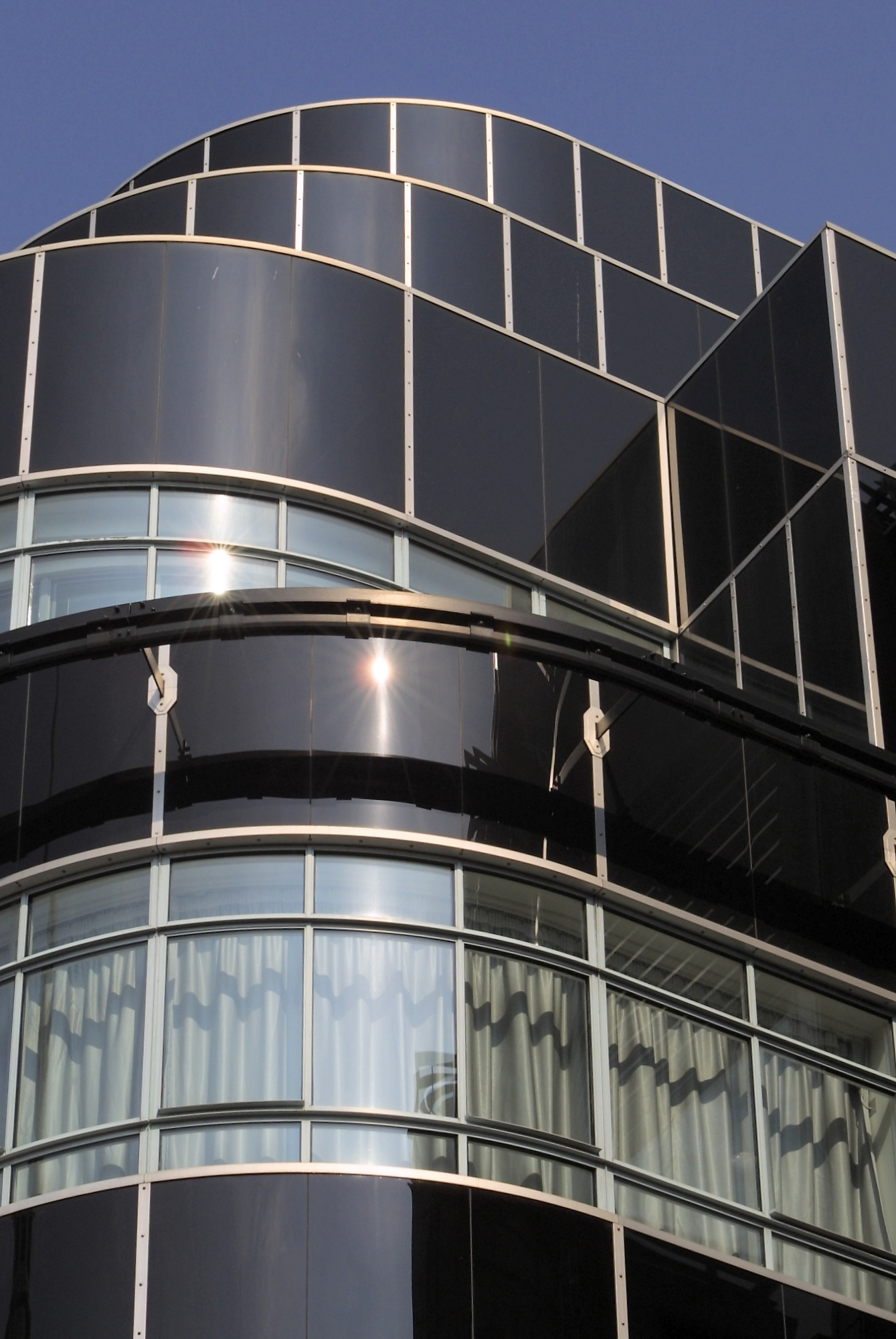
The former Daily Express building on Fleet Street, City of London, England

- Chamber of Commerce building, City of London, 1934
- Daily Express Building in Fleet Street, City of London, London, 1932
- Daily Telegraph Building (Peterborough House), City of London, 1928
- Florin Court, (Guy Morgan and Partners), City of London, 1936
- Unilever House, Victoria Embankment, Blackfriars, City of London, 1929

===== London – City of Westminster =====
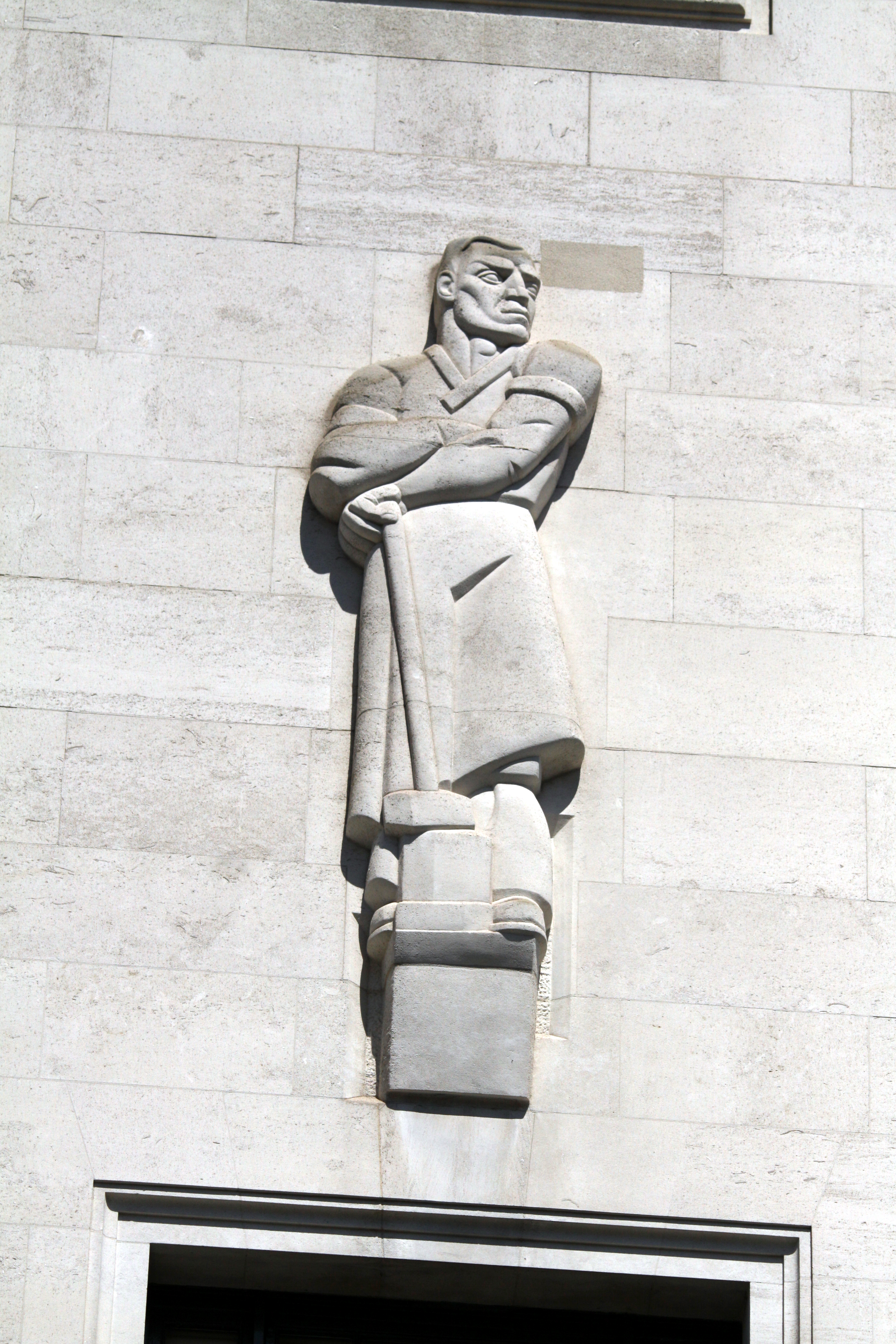
Royal Institute of British Architects, London, England

- 15 Portman Square, Westminster, London, 1930s
- 55 Broadway, Westminster, London, 1929
- 59-63 Princes Gate, Westminster, London, 1935
- 66 Portland Place, Marylebone, Westminster, London, 1934
- Adelphi Theatre, Westminster, London, 1930
- Alfies Antique Market, Lisson Grove, Westminster, London, 1976
- Apollo Victoria Theatre, Westminster, London, 1930
- BBC Broadcasting House, (Val Myer), Westminster, London, 1932
- Blenstock House (now Bonhams) West End, Westminster, London, 1937
- Claridge's, Mayfair, Westminster, London, 1812, 1920s
- Dolphin Square, Pimlico, Westminster, 1937
- The Dorchester, Mayfair, Westminster, London, 1931
- Grosvenor House Hotel, Mayfair, Westminster, London, 1929
- House of Fraser Oxford Street (former DH Evans), Westminster, London, 1937
- House for Marques and Marquesa de Casa Maury, 58 Hamilton Terrace, Maida Vale, Westminster, London, 1938
- Ideal House (now Palladium House), Westminster, London, 1929
- Lansdowne Club, Mayfair, Westminster, London, 1935
- Lawrence Hall, Westminster, London, 1928
- National Audit Office Head Office (former Imperial Airways Building), Westminster, London
- Odeon Leicester Square, Westminster, London, 1937
- Old Aeroworks (former London Spitfire Works), Lisson Grove, Marylebone, Westminster
- The Paviours Arms, Neville House, Page Street, Westminster, London, 1937
- Penguin Pool, London Zoo, Westminster, London, 1934
- Piccadilly Circus tube station, Mayfair, Westminster, London, 1928
- Prince of Wales Theatre, Leicester Square, Westminster, London, 1937
- Royal Institute of British Architects, Marylebone, Westminster, London, 1934
- Savoy Hotel, Westminster, London, 1930, 2010
- Shell Mex House (Ernest Joseph), Westminster, London, 1931
- Sheraton Grand London Park Lane Hotel, Piccadilly, Westminster, London, 1927
- Simpsons of Piccadilly, Piccadilly, Westminster, London, 1936
- Strand Palace Hotel, Westminster, London, 1909, 1930s
- Victoria Coach Station, Westminster, London, 1932
- Vue Cinema London- West End (formerly Warner Brothers Theatre), Leicester Square, 1938
- The Washington Mayfair Hotel, Mayfair, Westminster, 1913

==== Manchester ====
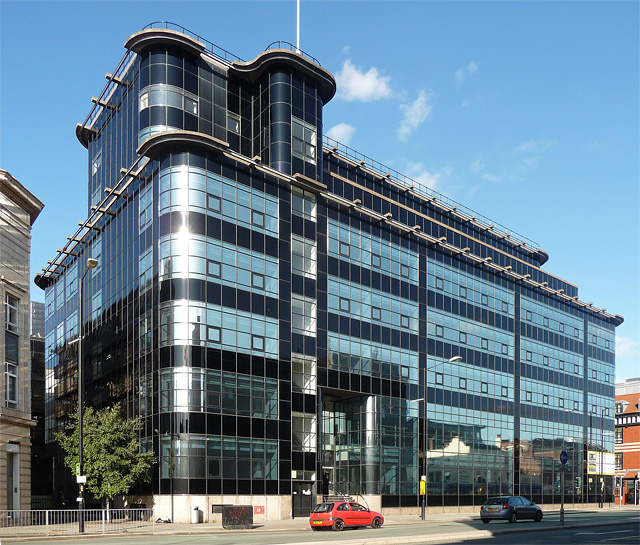
The Express Building, Manchester, England with its streamline moderne curves and orthogonal vitrolite windows.

- 100 King Street, King Street (formerly Midland Bank, Sir Edwin Lutyens, Grade II*), Manchester, 1935
- Appleby Lodge, Rusholme, Manchester, 1930s
- Chadderton Baths, Chadderton, Greater Manchester, 1937
- Daily Express Building, Great Ancoats Street (Sir Owen Williams, Grade II*), Manchester, 1936
- Dancehouse, Manchester, 1930
- Kendals Building, Deansgate (J.S. Beaumont, Grade II), Manchester, 1939
- Longford Cinema ("The Cash Register"), Stretford, Manchester, 1936
- Metro Cinema (formerly Majestic Picture House), Ashton-under-Lyne, Tameside, Greater Manchester, 1920
- Midland Bank Building - 100 King Street, Manchester, 1935
- Monaco Ballroom, Hindley, Greater Manchester
- Plaza Cinema (W. Thornley), Stockport, Greater Manchester, 1933
- Primark Building (former Lewis's Building), Manchester, 1920s
- Redfern Building, Dantzic Street (W. A. Johnson and J. W. Cooper, Grade II), Manchester, 1936
- Sunlight House, Quay Street (Joseph Sunlight, Grade II*), Manchester, 1932

==== Merseyside ====
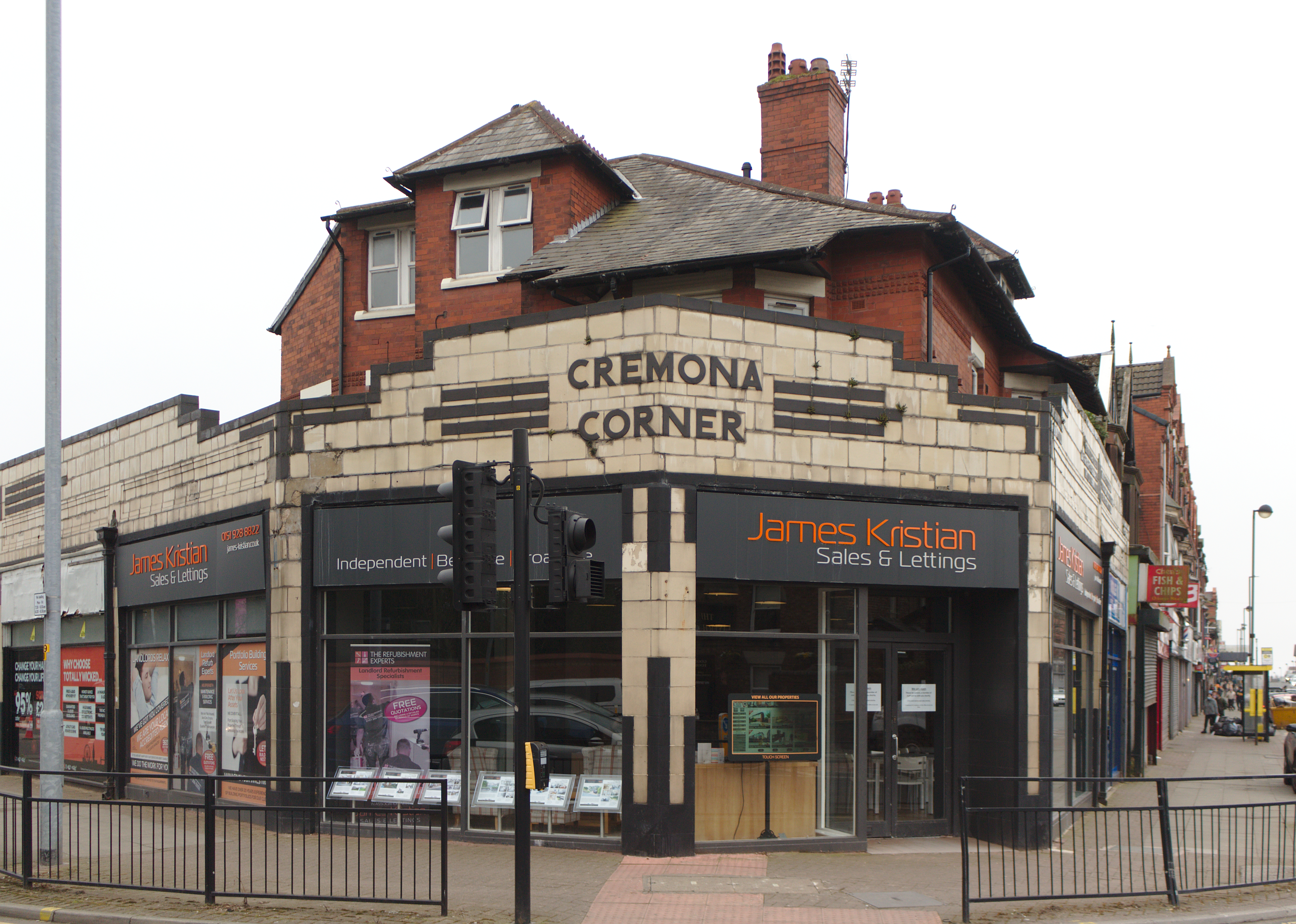
Cremona Corner, Waterloo, Merseyside, England

- Beacon House, Southport, Sefton, Merseyside, 1934
- Church of St Monica, Bootle, Merseyside, 1936
- Cremona Corner, Waterloo, Merseyside
- Garrick Theatre, Southport, Sefton,, Merseyside, 1932
- Hoylake railway station, Hoylake, Wirral, Merseyside, 1938
- New Palace amusement arcade, New Brighton, Merseyside
- Leo's Bar, Southport, Merseyside
- St. Bernadette's Church, Allerton, Liverpool, Merseyside
- Upton Library, Upton, Wirral, Merseyside, 1936

==== North Yorkshire ====
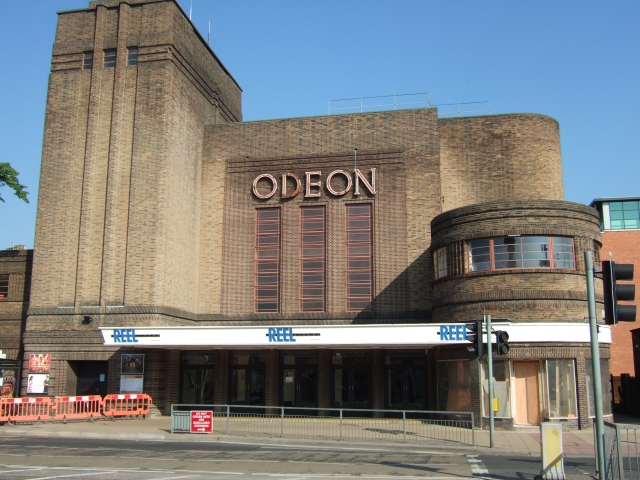
Reel Cinema, York, North Yorkshire, England

- former Burton's Coney Street, York, North Yorkshire, 1931
- former Burton's High Ousegate, York, North Yorkshire, 1933
- Castle Cinema, Pickering, North Yorkshire, 1937
- Dunlop Factory, Dunlophillow, Pannal, Harrogate, North Yorkshire
- Odeon Cinema, Harrogate, North Yorkshire, 1936
- Reel Cinema (formerly Odeon Cinema), York, North Yorkshire

==== Somerset ====
- BlueSkies Apartments, Minehead, Somerset
- former Burton's, Weston-super-Mare, Somerset
- Curzon Community Cinema, Clevedon, North Somerset, 1922
- The Forum, Bath, Somerset, 1934
- former Regal Cinema, Wells, Somerset, 1935
- Mecca Bingo Hall and Cinema, Bridgwater, Somerset, 1936
- Odeon Cinema, Weston-super-Mare, Somerset, 1935
- former Odeon Cinema, Yeovil, South Somerset, 1937
- Seaquarium Tropicana, Weston-super-Mare, Somerset

==== Surrey ====
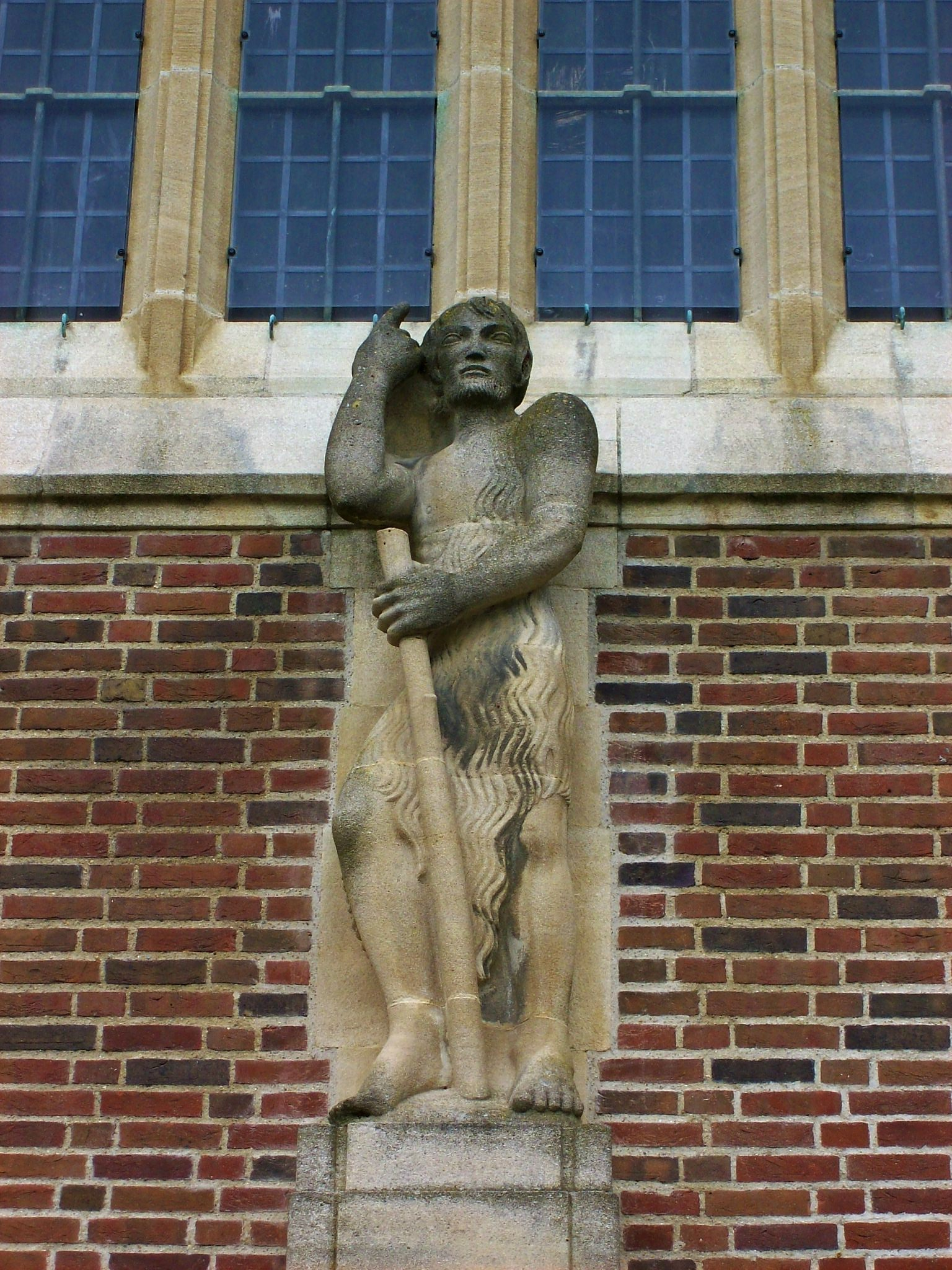
Guildford Cathedral, Guildford, Surrey, England

- former Burton's, Guildford, Surrey
- Burton's, Walton-on-Thames, Surrey
- former Burton's Woking, Surrey
- Dorking Halls, Dorking, Surrey, 1931
- Everyman Theatre, Esher, Surrey, 1937
- Guildford Cathedral, Guildford, Surrey, 1936–1961
- Joldwynds House, Holmbury St. Mary, Surrey, 1932
- Leatherhead Theatre (formerly Thorndike Theatre), Leatherhead, Surrey, 1930s

==== Tyne and Wear ====
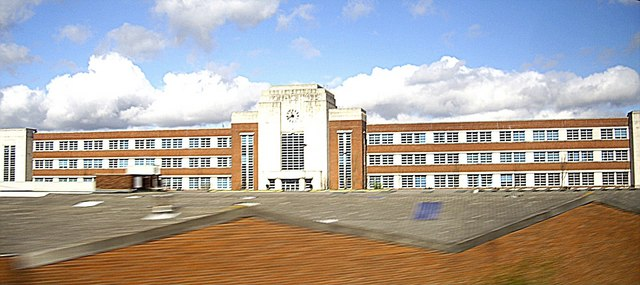
W.D. & H.O. Wills Building, Newcastle upon Tyne, England

- Baltic Centre for Contemporary Art (formerly the Baltic Flour Mill), Gateshead, Tyne and Wear, 1950
- Co-operative Building Newbury Street, Newcastle upon Tyne, Tyne and Wear,
- Jesmond Synagogue, Newcastle upon Tyne, Tyne and Wear, England, 1915
- Newcastle Odeon - Paramount Theatre Building, Newcastle upon Tyne, Tyne and Wear, 1931
- Sunderland Synagogue, Sunderland, Tyne and Wear, 1928
- W.D. & H.O. Wills Building (Wills Factory), Newcastle upon Tyne, 1940s
- West Monkseaton Metro station, Monkseaton, North Tyneside, Tyne and Wear, 1933

==== Warwickshire ====
- Leamington Spa railway station, Leamington Spa, 1939

=== Northern Ireland ===
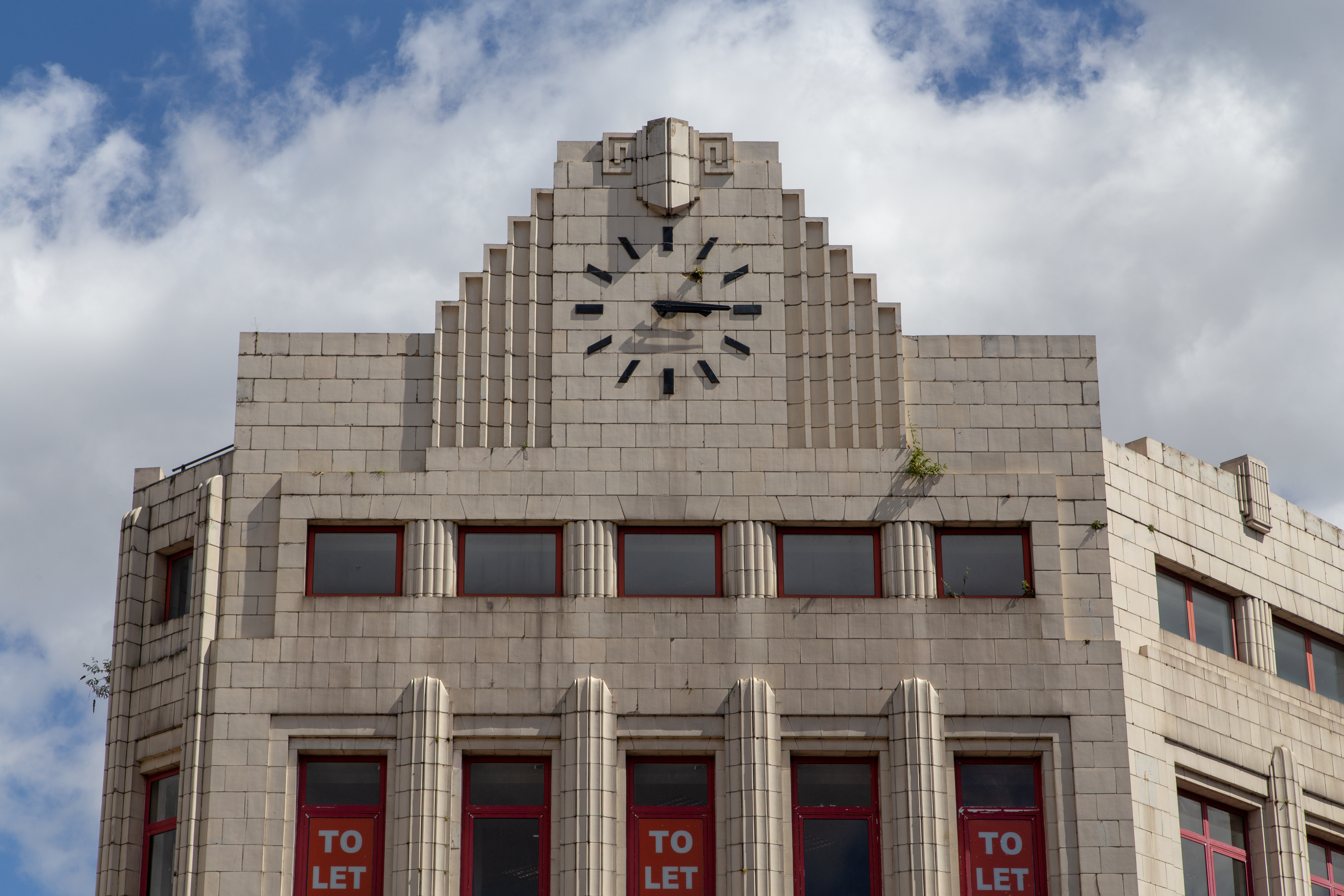
Sinclair Building, Belfast, Northern Ireland

- Bank of Ireland (formerly Bangor Grammar School), Bangor
- former Bank of Ireland building, Belfast, 1930
- Broadcasting House, Belfast, Northern Ireland, 1936
- Brookmont Building, Belfast, 1932
- Cafe Nero, Belfast, 1935
- David Keir Building, Queen's University, Belfast, 1957
- Dunnes Stores (formerly Burton's and Woolworth's), Belfast, 1933
- Imperial Building, Donegall Square East, Belfast, 1935
- North Street Arcade, Cathedral Quarter, Belfast, Northern Ireland, 1938
- Sinclair House, Belfast, 1916, 1935
- Strand Cinema (now Strand Arts Centre), Belfast, Northern Ireland, 1935
- Whitlia Hall, Queen's University, Belfast

=== Scotland ===
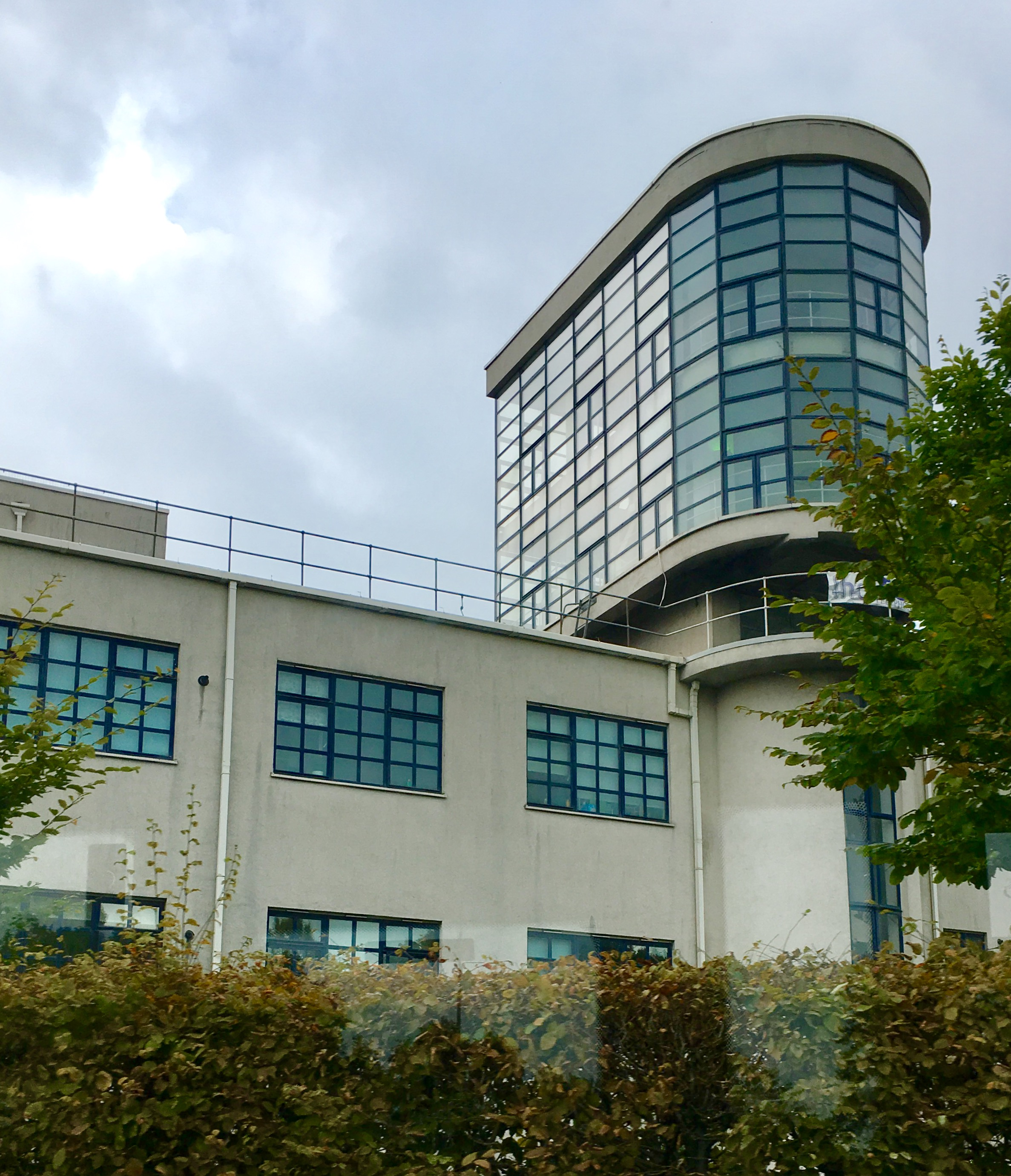
Luma Tower, former lightbulb factory, Glasgow, Scotland

- Barrfields Pavilion, Barrfields, Largs, North Ayrshire, 1930
- 30 Old Kirk Road, Corstorphine, Edinburgh, 1931
- Beach Ballroom, Aberdeen, 1926
- Bellgrove Hotel, Gallowgate, Glasgow, 1930s
- Beresford Hotel (Weddell and Inglis), Glasgow, 1938
- Birks Cinema, Aberfeldy, Perth and Kinross, 1939
- Bon Accord Baths, Aberdeen, 1940
- Castlebrae Business Centre, Peffer Place, Edinburgh, 1936
- Cragburn Pavilion, (J. & J.A. Carrick, 1936), Gourock, Renfrewshire, 1936
- Dominion Cinema, Morningside, Edinburgh, 1938
- India of Inchinnan office block, (former tyre factory, Thomas Wallis) Inchinnan, Renfrewshire, 1930
- Fountainbridge Library, Edinburgh, 1940
- Glasgow Film Theatre, Glasgow, 1939
- India of Inchinnan, Renfrewshire, 1930s
- Kino, Leven, Fife, 1937
- Luma Tower, (former lightbulb factory, Cornelius Armour), Greater Govan, Glasgow. 1938
- Maybury Casino, South Maybury, Edinburgh, 1935
- Nardini's Cafe, Largs, Ayrshire, 1935
- New Bedford Cinema, (now the O2 Academy, Lennox and McMath), Gorbals/Laurieston, Glasgow, 1932
- former Odeon Cinema, Glasgow, 1939
- Ravelston Garden, (Andrew Neil and Robert Hurd), Ravelston, Edinburgh, 1936
- Rogano Restaurant, Glasgow, 1935
- Ross House, Hawkhead Hospital, Renfrewshire, 1936
- Rothesay Pavilion, Rothesay, Argyll and Bute, Isle of Bute, 1938
- Southside Garage, Causewayside, Edinburgh, 1933
- Spirit Aerosystems Building, Prestwick International Airport, Glasgow, 1941
- St Andrew's House, (Thomas S. Tait), Calton Hill, Edinburgh, 1939
- Stonehaven Open Air Pool, Stonehaven, Aberdeenshire, 1934
- Tait Tower, (Thomas S. Tait), Bellahouston Park, Glasgow, 1938
- Tarlair Swimming Pool, MacDuff, Aberdeenshire, 1931
- Weirs Pump, Cathcart, Glasgow
- White House art space, Craigmillar, Edinburgh, 1936
- Willison House (former Robertson's House Furnishers), Dundee, c. 1934 (destroyed by fire, 2022)
- Wilson Memorial United Free Church, Portobello, Edinburgh, 1933
- Younger Hall, St. Andrews, 1929

=== Wales ===
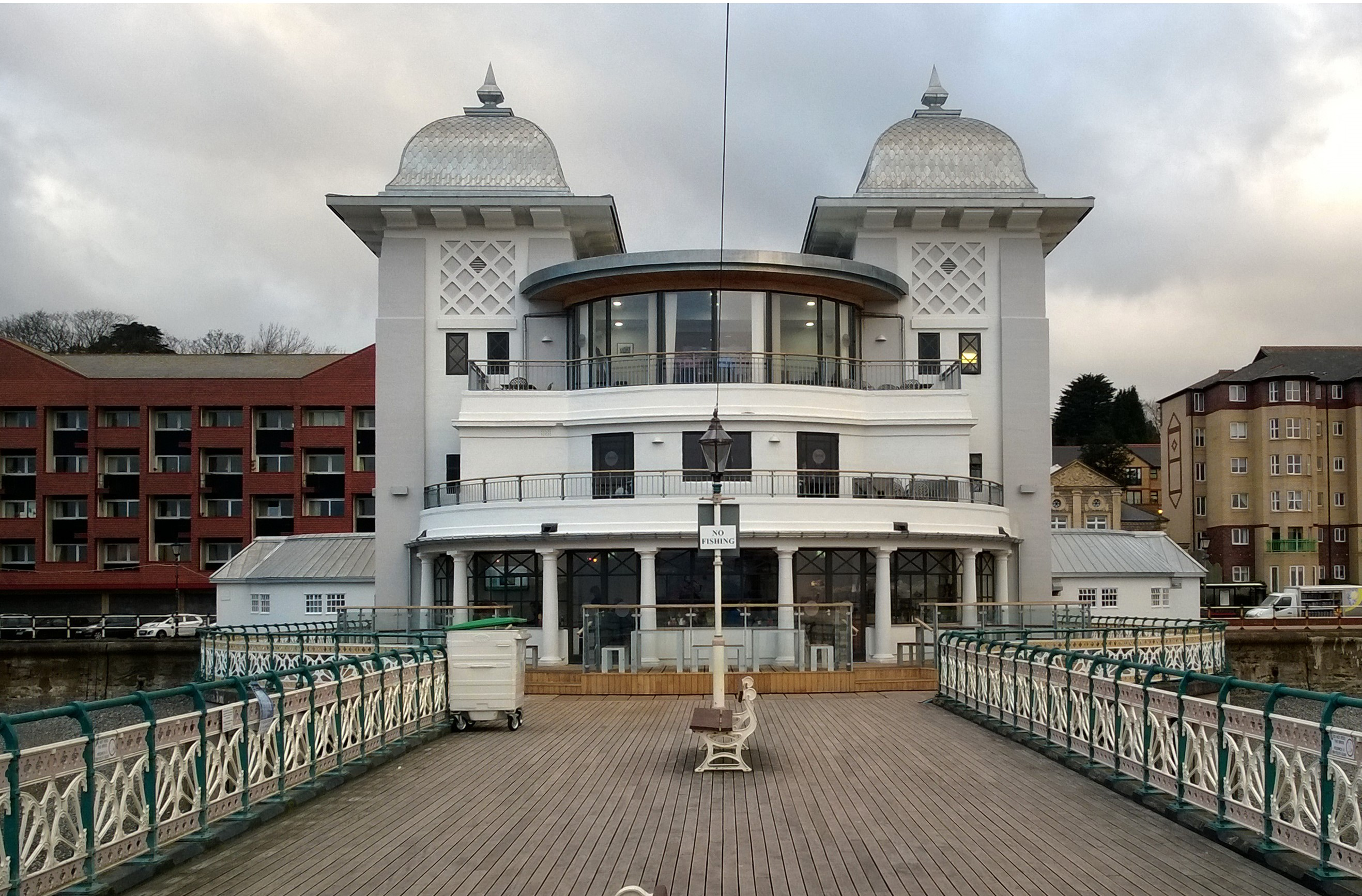
Rear of the pavilion (Penarth Pier), Penarth, Wales

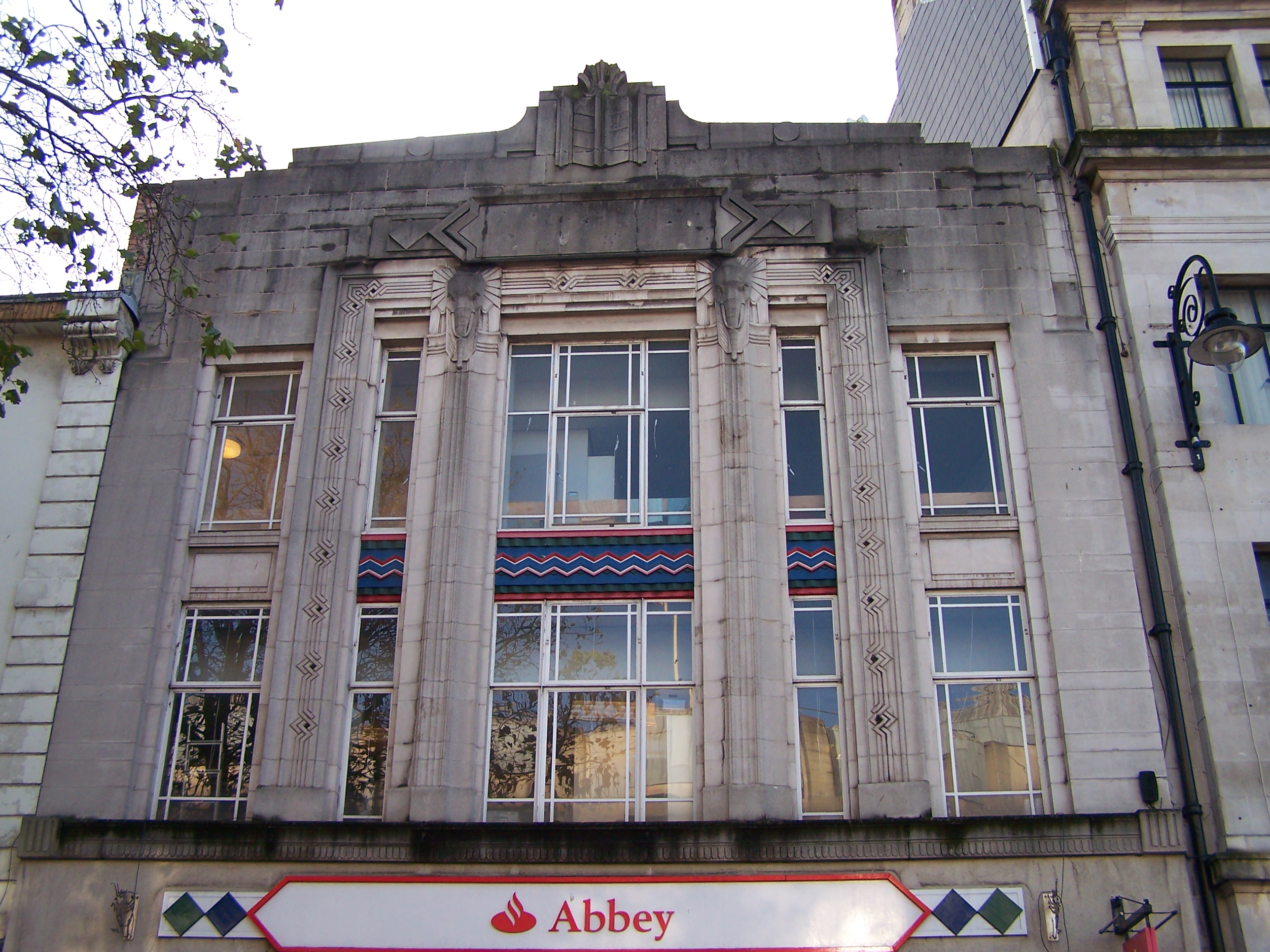
former Burton's, Cardiff, Wales

- 237 High Street commercial building, Swansea
- Automobile Palace, Llandrindod Wells
- Burton's shop, Abergavenny, Monmouthshire, 1937
- former Burton's shop, Cardiff
- former Burton's shop, Neath
- Burton's shop, Newport
- Canolfan Gwaith Abertawe (Swansea Job Centre), Swansea
- Cardiff Central railway station, Cardiff, 1934
- Coliseum Theatre, Aberdare, 1938
- Cross Hands Public Hall, Cross Hands, Carmarthenshire, 1920
- Guildhall, Swansea 1930–1934
- The NEON (formerly Odeon Cinema), (Harry Weedon) Newport, 1938
- Newport Civic Centre, Newport, 1937
- Noddfa Capel y Bedyddwyr, Porthcawl
- Old Post Office building (now Jaflon Restaurant), Penarth, 1936
- Oystermouth Branch Library, Swansea, 1935
- Penarth Pier, Penarth, Vale of Glamorgan, South Wales, 1934
- Pola Cinema, Welshpool, 1938
- Pritchard and Sons Garage, Llandrindod Wells
- Queen's & Royal Garage, Cardiff, 1930s
- Shangri-La, Pontllanfraith, Blackwood, 1930s
- Tabernacl Welsh Independent Chapel, 1931
- Temple of Peace, Cardiff, 1938
- Villa Marina, Llandudno, 1936
- Wesley Methodist Church, Caerphilly, Caerphilly County Borough
- Winton House, Penarth, Vale of Glamorgan, 1930s

=== Crown Dependencies ===
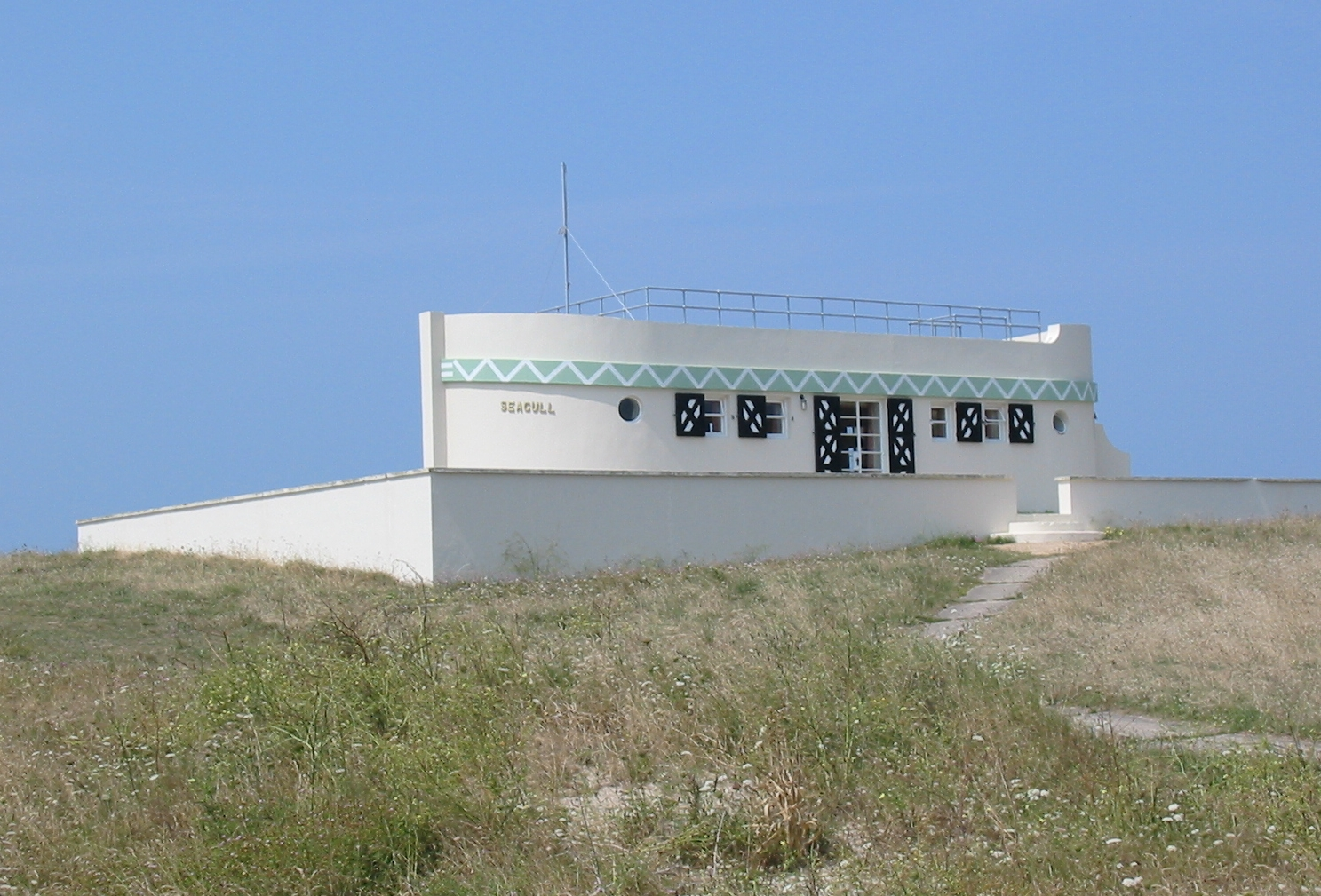
Barge Aground cabin, St Ouën, Jersey

- Barge Aground cabin; St Ouën, Jersey
- Boots Store, Saint Helier, Jersey
- Burtons Building, Saint Helier, Jersey
- Ferguson's Folly house, Saint Helier, Jersey
- Hâvre des Pas bathing pool, Saint Helier, Jersey
- Hill Street (Rue des Trais Pigeons), Saint Helier, Jersey
- Les Lumières house, Route Orange, St. Brelade, Jersey
- Play House Apartments (former Playhouse Theatre), Saint Helier, Jersey, 1937
- Saint Matthew's Church, Millbrook, Saint Lawrence, Jersey
- States Building, Saint Helier, Jersey
- Westmount house (Lé Mont ès Pendus), Saint Helier, Jersey

== See also ==
- List of Art Deco architecture
- Art Deco topics
- Streamline Moderne architecture
