= Belvedere Court =

Building in East Finchley, London, England

Coordinates: 51.5846°N 0.1698°W

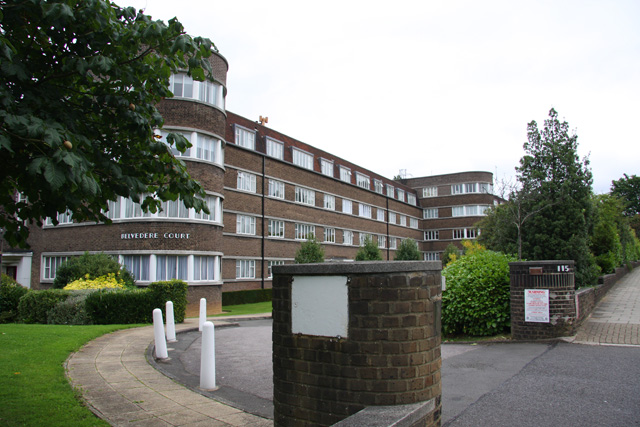
Belvedere Court, London

Belvedere Court is a residential block of 56 flats in Lyttelton Road, East Finchley, North London, England. It was designed by the architect Ernst L. Freud and built by H Meckhonik, a London-based contractor, in 1937/38 on land previously owned by the Church Estate Commissioners.

The flats were initially built for rental only and principally let to Jewish families from Europe, moving to Britain to escape the Nazi occupation. The flats incorporated many modern facilities, including waste disposal chutes, fully fitted kitchens and central heating. Many of these features were considered the height of luxury in the 1930s.

As a child, the television personality Jerry Springer lived at Belvedere Court with his family. In the 1990s, the then freeholder, The Liverpool Victoria Friendly Society sold the block to Frogmore Estates without first offering it to the residents which they were obliged to do under the 1987 Landlord & Tenant Act. The plans were withdrawn following a ruling by the High Court and the freehold eventually secured by the residents. The law was changed to impose financial penalties on freeholders not observing these conditions.

It is a fine example of 'moderne' design and is characterized by streamline pavilion windows, stone bands, stepped entrance surrounds, Crittall windows and a number of other architectural features which are typical of the period. Many of the original lights and fittings within flats were also of the art deco style, with chrome door handles, jade green bathrooms and globe lights. Unfortunately, as the flats have been modernised, many of these features have disappeared. Belvedere Court received its Grade II listing in 1999.

== See also ==
- Florin Court
- Cholmeley Lodge
- Du Cane Court
- Trinity Court, Gray’s Inn Road
