= Hillfield Court =

Residential building in London, England

Coordinates: 51°33′01″N 0°10′01″W

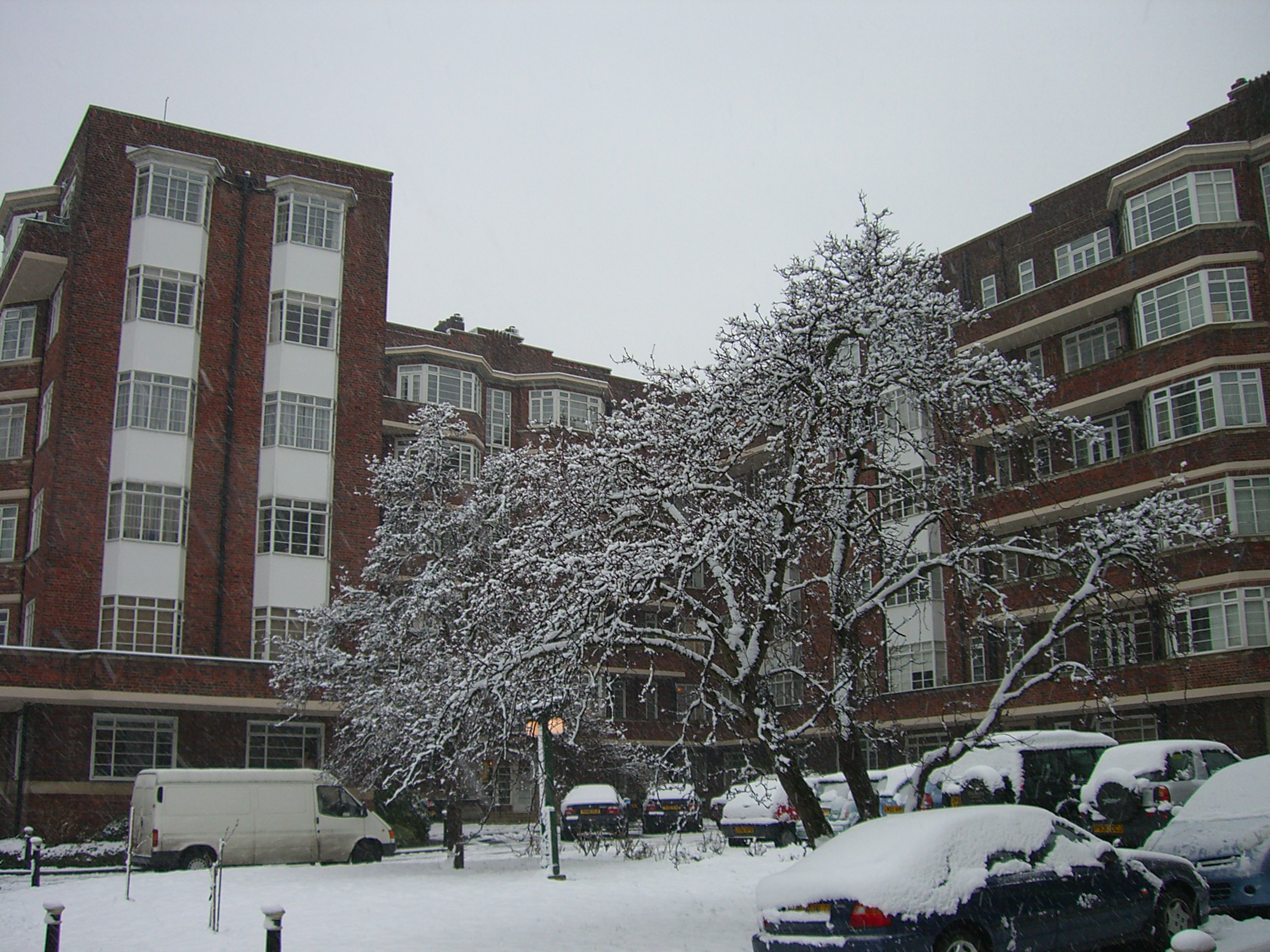
Hillfield Court on a winter's morning

Hillfield Court is a prominent art deco residential mansion block in Belsize Park, in the London Borough of Camden, built in 1934. It is located off Belsize Avenue and can also be accessed from Glenloch Road. It is one of the many purpose built mansion blocks on Haverstock Hill between Chalk Farm and Hampstead. It is close to the amenities near Belsize Park tube station, as well as the shops of Belsize Village, South End Green and Hampstead.

== Site history ==
Hillfield Court sits on what was once a large country estate known as the Belsize Estate. The first recorded building on the site of what today is Hillfield Court was built in around 1646. It was known as the Blue House and was one of many rural abodes in the area belonging to wealthy merchants, who wanted a country residence within easy reach of London. The Blue House was accessed directly from Haverstock Hill. Little is known about the residents of the Blue House but evidence suggests that in 1650 it was occupied by one John Mascall and in 1679 by Thomas Butler. Between 1761 and 1773, the house was rebuilt and extended by merchant William Horsley.

In 1808, the Belsize Estate was split into 9 leasehold estates. The Hillfield leasehold, as well as the adjoining Belsize House leasehold (around 19 acres (77,000 m^{2}) in total) were bought by James Abel.

In 1841 Basil Woodd, a Bond Street brandy merchant bought the lease from Abel, a 19-acre (77,000 m^{2}) estate set within the boundaries of Belsize Avenue, Belsize Park Gardens and Belsize Grove. By this time, the area to the west of Haverstock Hill was dotted with many country abodes. The former Blue House had by this stage been renovated, modernised and renamed Heathfield House, a stuccoed 6-bedroom house with a library. Woodd acquired the freehold of the land in 1857 and renamed the house Hillfield. Sometime between 1864 and 1867 he built another house on the south end of the estate for his son Robert Ballard Woodd – This house was called Woodlands. Whilst Woodlands was demolished in 1901 to make way for higher density housing, Hillfield remained until 1928 when it was demolished. The land was bought by Hillfield Estates Ltd, a company formed in 1933 by FL, WJ and AG Griggs (Frank, William and Alfred).

The activities of Griggs & Son Ltd of Victoria St, London included land development in Pinner, building theatres for the Astoria group in London and in Brighton (1933) and building at least two other theatres in the West End. Griggs & Son developed the Hillfield site to cater for the high demand for mansion blocks. The destruction of the old house and the development of the estate was met with some local opposition, however.

== The building ==
Hillfield Court, so named in commemoration of the grand house, was just one part of the development. The scheme also included two other mansion blocks – Tudor Close (1935) to the back of the estate; and on Haverstock Hill, a parade of shops with Hillfield Mansions above (1934), which remained in the ownership of Hillfield Estates Ltd for many years. The parade incorporated an Odeon cinema, one of the first in London, which opened in September 1934. The flagship of the Odeon chain for several years, it was demolished in the 1970s. It was replaced by the Screen on the Hill cinema (since changed hands and renamed the Everyman Belsize Park).

The architect for the flats (and the cinema) was Thomas Bennett; he also designed the block of flats on nearby Finchley Road, above what is now a Waitrose store. The practice he founded continues today. His design for Hillfield Court provided 113 flats over six storeys, in seven different layouts and intended to suit a variety of tenants. Bennett had given much thought to the planning of apartment buildings for London. At Hillfield Court, he adopted the 'dining-hall' in some layouts, for more efficient use of the available space. A boiler room provides hot water to all flats and heating to common parts. Originally there was a central store for tenants' own coal, carried up by porters to be burned on the open fires. From its inception Hillfield Court was considered a prestigious block, not least because of its fine, spacious gardens.

During the Second World War a barrage balloon was anchored on the Hillfield Court lawn. Royal Air Force personnel were housed in a ground floor flat ready to launch the balloon when necessary. These large, airborne barriers protected important installations against low-level air attack. A brick bunkhouse built for the crew remains, now used as the garden shed.

The flats were rented out on short leases until in 1969, inflation saw tenants for the first time being given the opportunity to purchase their flats on a 99-year lease. For a while the family firm continued to manage the block directly but in the mid-1970s, the building was placed in the hands of managing agents. By that stage the principal shareholder was FE (Francis) Griggs and when he died in 1977, control of the freehold passed to Mrs JL Griggs. Eventually, according to various residents, there came the shattering news that Hillfield Court had been sold to "unscrupulous experts at asset stripping". The twenty one flats that were still rented out were then sold on long leases to a property company. There was talk of building townhouses with garages and an access road on the much-loved gardens.

Fighting back vigorously, the Residents Association organised speeches, television interviews and meetings with Camden Council in the hope of saving their garden. Eventually they prevailed – a preservation order was placed on every tree. Camden Council effectively refused permission to build and the residents were elated.

By 1985 residents had ensured that the landlord's potential for making money was small. A group of leaseholders established Hillfield Court Limited to buy the freehold, an agreement was reached, 84 residents subscribed and they became the new owners. Maintenance and improvement work continues year on year, still preserving the building's essential character.

== Notable former residents ==
Although no blue plaque appears on the building, several famous people have resided in Hillfield Court over the years including actress Diana Wynyard, author Leonard Arthur Bethell, novelist Kay Dick and the photographer Bill Brandt.

Sophie Turner, the English actress who rose to international fame playing Sansa Stark in the HBO series Game of Thrones lived in the block in the early 2010s, as did media personality and paparazzo Darryn Lyons.

== See also ==
- Trinity Court, Gray’s Inn Road
- Florin Court
- Du Cane Court
- Cholmeley Lodge
