= Charterhouse Square =

Garden square in Farringdon in the London Borough of Islington

Coordinates: 51°31′15.35″N 0°05′55.35″W

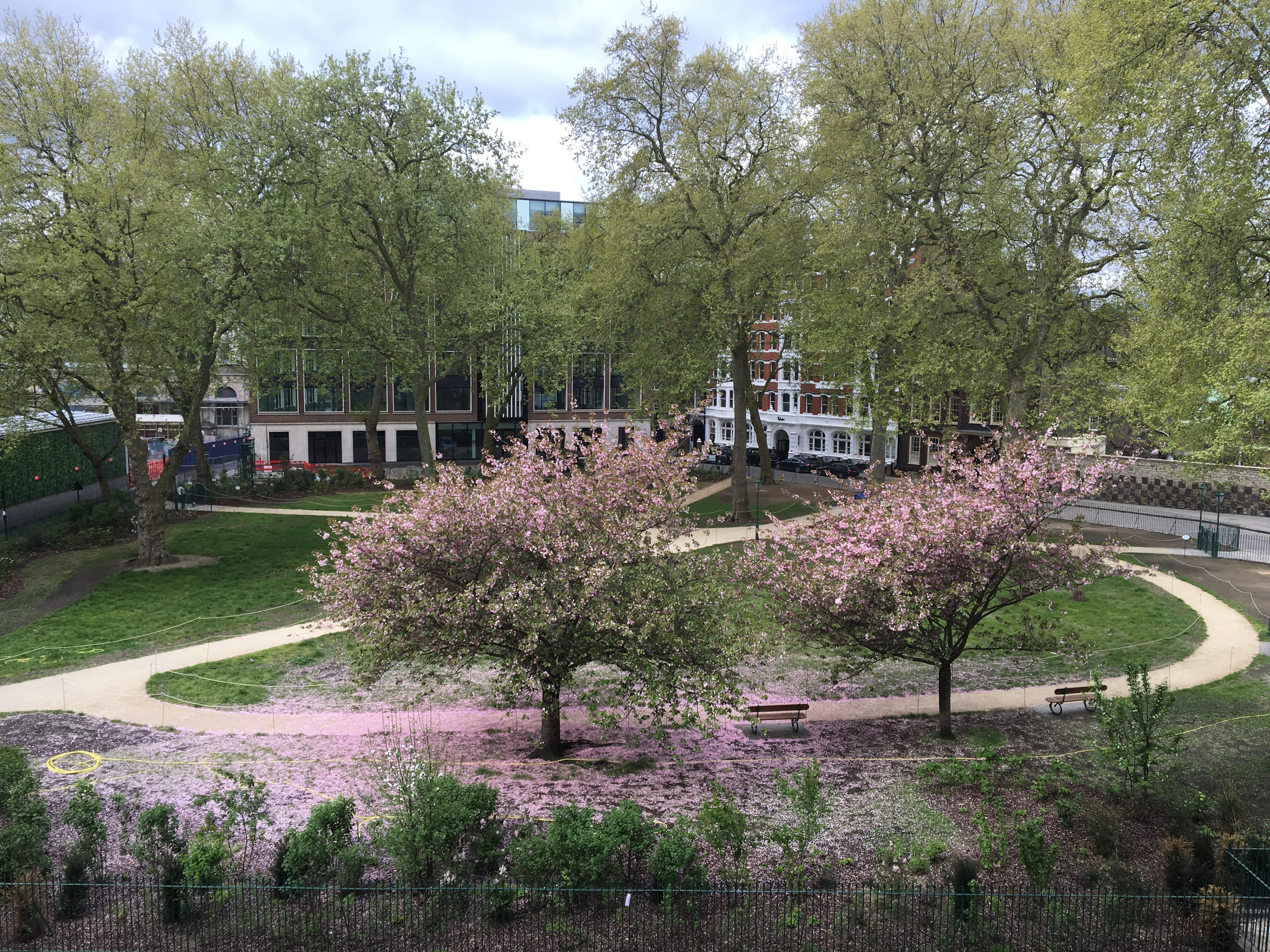
Charterhouse Square garden

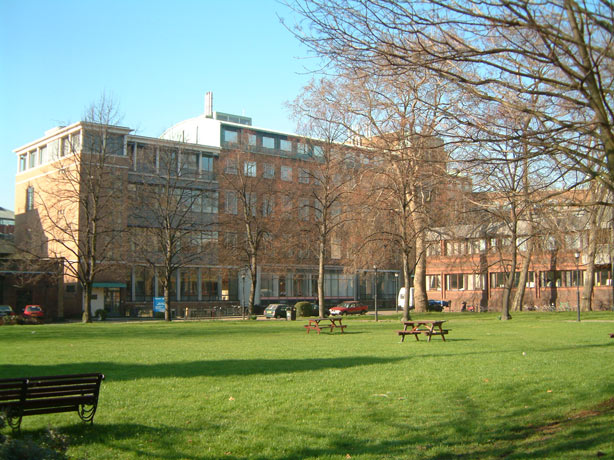
Charterhouse Square: parts of Barts and The London School of Medicine and Dentistry

Charterhouse Square is a garden square, a pentagonal space, in Farringdon, in the London Borough of Islington, and close to the former Smithfield Meat Market. The square is the largest courtyard or yard associated with the London Charterhouse, mostly formed of Tudor and Stuart architecture restored after the London Blitz. The square adjoins other buildings including a small school. It lies between Charterhouse Street, Carthusian Street and the main Charterhouse complex of buildings south of Clerkenwell Road. The complex includes a Chapel, Tudor Great Hall, Great Chamber, the Barts and The London School of Medicine and Dentistry and a 40-resident almshouse.

The 2-acre (0.8 ha) square roughly covers a large 14th-century plague pit, discovered by deep excavations for Crossrail near which, within the main site, the history of the Charterhouse is exhibited in a branch of the Museum of London. The southern end of the square forms the southern boundary of the London Borough of Islington, where it meets the City of London.

== History ==
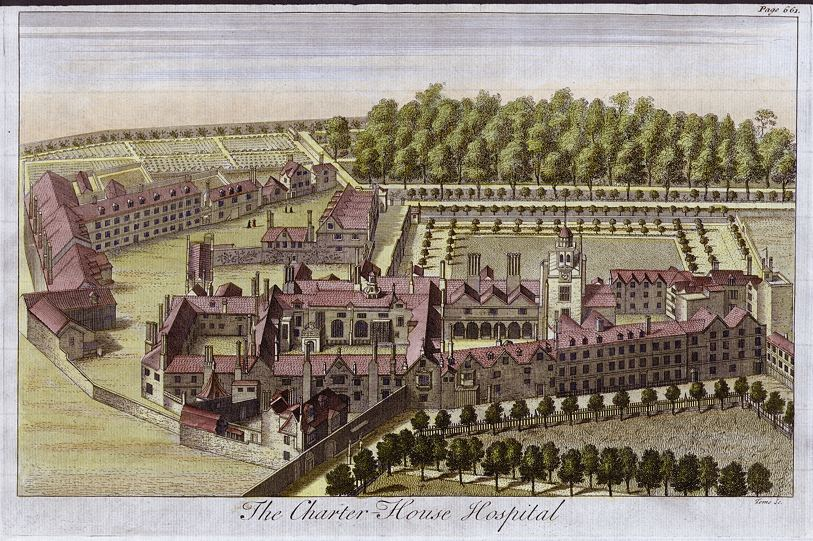
Colour engraving circa 1770

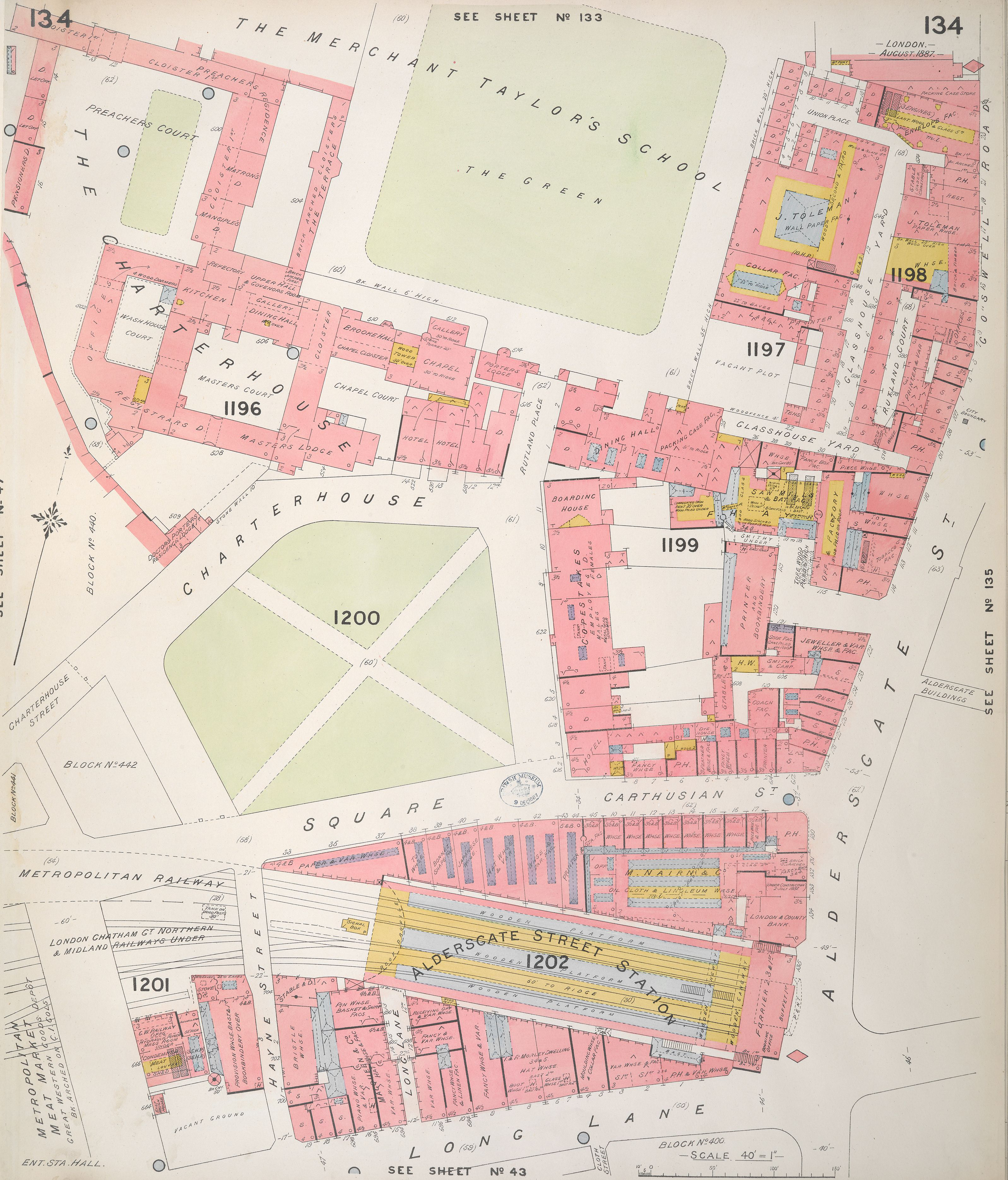
Map for fire risk, 1887

In 1371 a Carthusian monastery was founded by Walter de Manny on what is now the north side of the square. It was established near a 1348 plague pit, which formed the largest mass grave in London during the Black Death, and tens of thousands of bodies were buried there. The common name for Carthusian monasteries, Charterhouse, was an Anglicisation of La Grande Chartreuse, whose order founded the monastery.

The Charterhouse was dissolved as a monastery in 1537, and in 1545 was purchased by Sir Edward (later Lord) North (c. 1496–1564) and transformed into a mansion house. Following North's death, the property was bought by Thomas Howard, 4th Duke of Norfolk, who was imprisoned there in 1570 after scheming to marry Mary, Queen of Scots. Later, Thomas Sutton bought the Charterhouse, and on his death in 1611, endowed a hospital (almshouse) and school there, which opened in 1614, supporting 80 pensioners (known as 'brothers'). The boys' school coexisted with the home for pensioners until 1872 when Charterhouse School moved to Godalming in Surrey. Following this, the Merchant Taylors' School occupied the buildings until 1933. One side is partially occupied by Charterhouse Square School, a small independent primary school.

In July 2011, English Heritage granted Grade II listed status to the "setted" road surface in the square, which was laid down in the 1860s.

== Administrative history ==
The west of the square is within the former civil parish of St Sepulchre Middlesex, with the east in the former Liberty of Glasshouse Yard, with the former Liberty of Charterhouse just to the north. These three units were, with nearby Clerkenwell, part of the former Finsbury Division. They later became part of the Metropolitan Borough of Finsbury, formed in 1900. In 1965 the Metropolitan Boroughs of Finsbury and Islington merged to form the new London Borough of Islington.

== Plague burials ==
In 2014 evidence of the large burial pit for plague victims dating from 1348 to 1350, the time of the Black death, was discovered under the square by workers building the Crossrail project. Subsequent analysis of DNA and isotopes from the skeletons of those buried revealed data about Londoners who fell victim to the pandemic, such as their birthplace, diet, and the fact that there were actually three periods of plague burials, from 1348, 1361 and the early 15th century as outbreaks recurred.

== Current uses ==
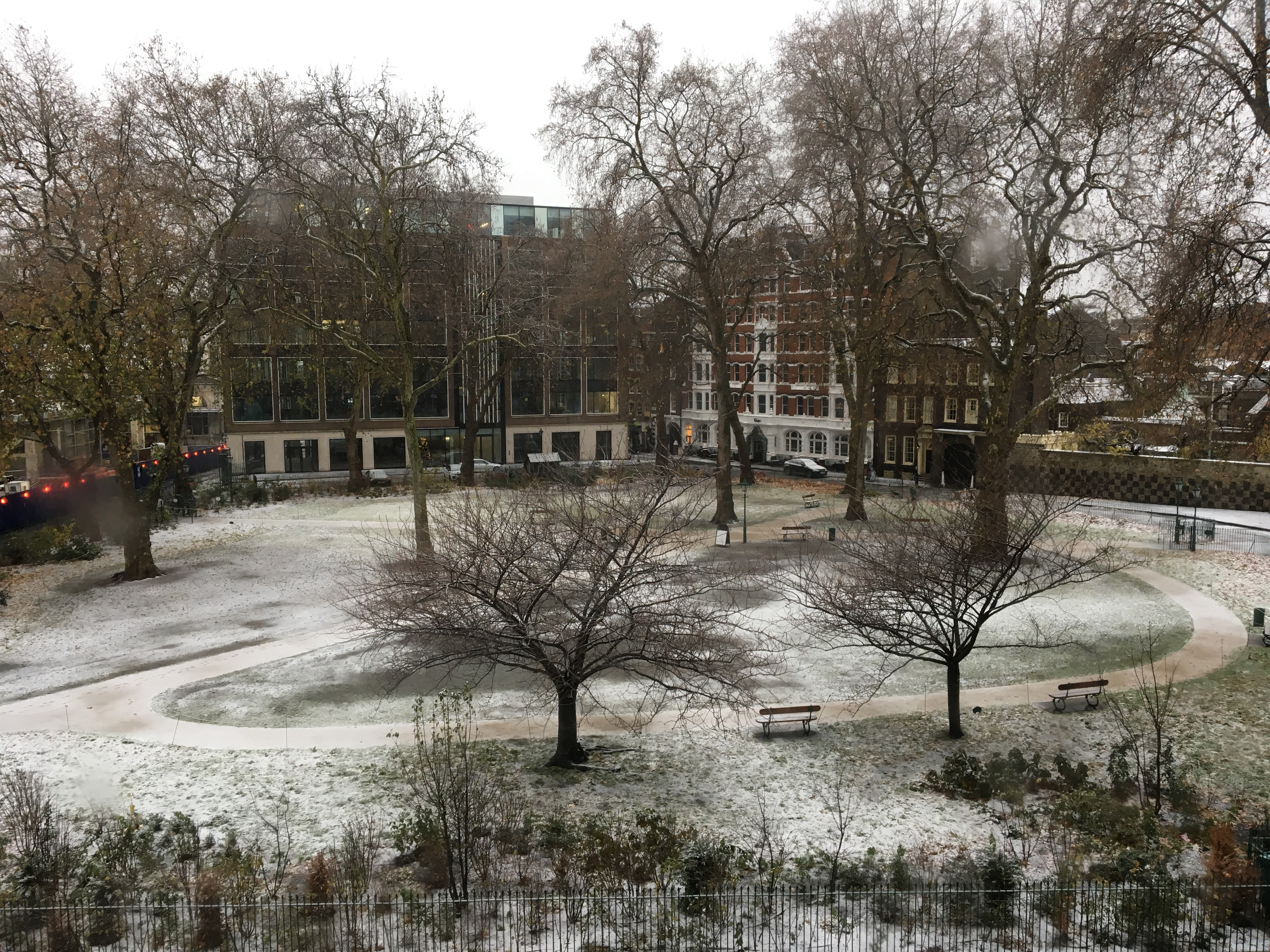
Snow in Charterhouse Square

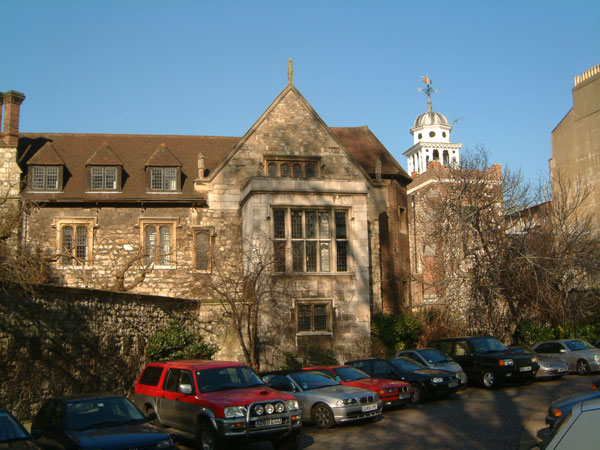
Tudor buildings of the Charterhouse

=== Almshouse, chapel, care home and let premises ===
Charterhouse gives accommodation as an Almshouse to over forty single pensioners aged over sixty many of whom retain the tradition of having been "military men, schoolmasters, clergy, artists, musicians, writers and businessmen", who are in financial, housing and social need but not in significant debt and keen to contribute to the community. Additionally it has the Queen Elizabeth II Infirmary Care Home and private tenants in 9 commercial units, 13 flats and 3 houses. The complex is open for pre-booked guided tours. The chapel can be viewed as part of the annual Open House London event. The site extends far back from the north side of the square in restored buildings and garden courtyards of the old monastery/school.

=== Campus of Barts and The London School of Medicine and Dentistry ===
The Charterhouse Square campus of Queen Mary University of London starts at the north-east corner of the square and then spreads out; close to a café and few narrow houses fronting that side, it occupies new buildings and some of the former school buildings. It comprises student accommodation and departments of Barts and The London School of Medicine and Dentistry: Barts Cancer Institute (BCI), the Wolfson Institute of Preventive Medicine and the William Harvey Research Institute (WHRI). The BCI and the Centre for Cancer Prevention (CCP) within the Wolfson Institute also make up the Cancer Research UK Barts Centre of Excellence, together with Barts and the London NHS Trust. In 2018, the School received a £6.5 million grant from the Barts Charity to redevelop the campus.

=== Smaller sites on the square ===
Florin Court

Florin Court, a residential building in the Art Deco style built in 1936 by Guy Morgan and Partners, is on the east side. The building has a concave façade, roof garden and basement swimming pool.

Charterhouse Square School

Charterhouse Square School is on the south side of the square; it is a co-educational, independent school for ages 3 to 11, with a small roll of pupils. Smithfield Market is to the south-west along Charterhouse Street.

== Transport links ==
- The nearest station to the square is Barbican tube station, 80 metres away on the A1. The station is served by the Circle, Hammersmith & City and Metropolitan lines.
- The next nearest, Farringdon, is served by the same tube lines, as well as Thameslink and the Elizabeth line.

== In fiction ==
Florin Court was used as the fictional residence of Hercule Poirot, Whitehaven Mansions, in the 1980s TV series Agatha Christie's Poirot based on Agatha Christie's crime novels.

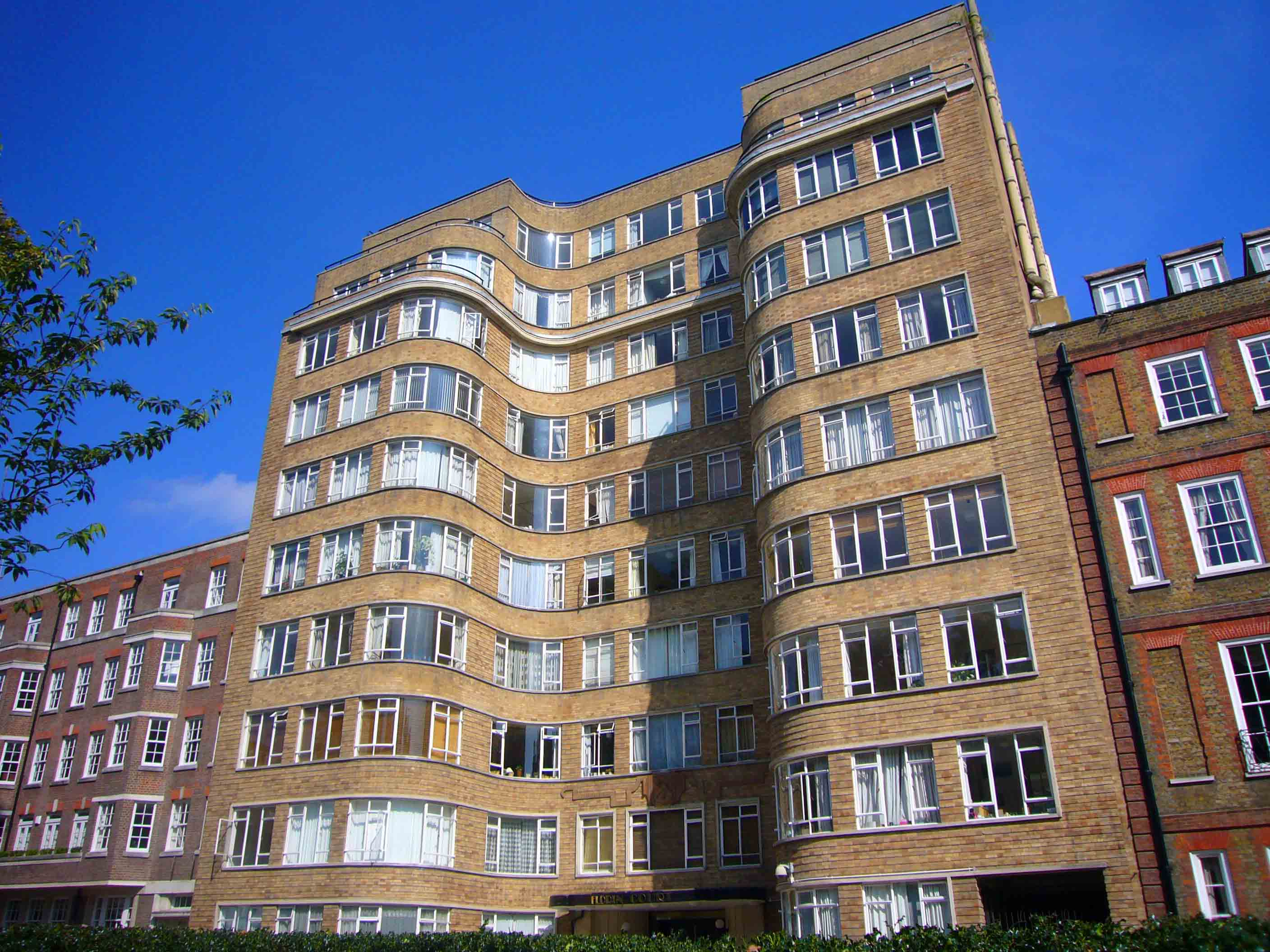
Florin Court viewed from the Charterhouse Square garden

== See also ==
- Clerkenwell
- Barbican Estate
