= Trinity Court, Gray's Inn Road =

Residential apartment block in London, England

Coordinates: 51.52560°N 0.1160°W

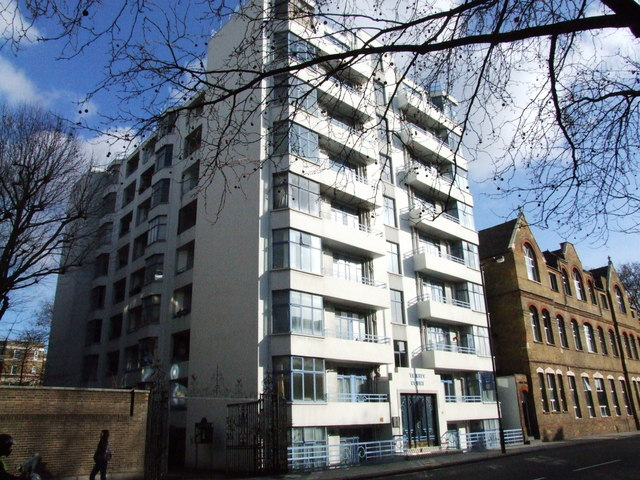
Trinity Court building

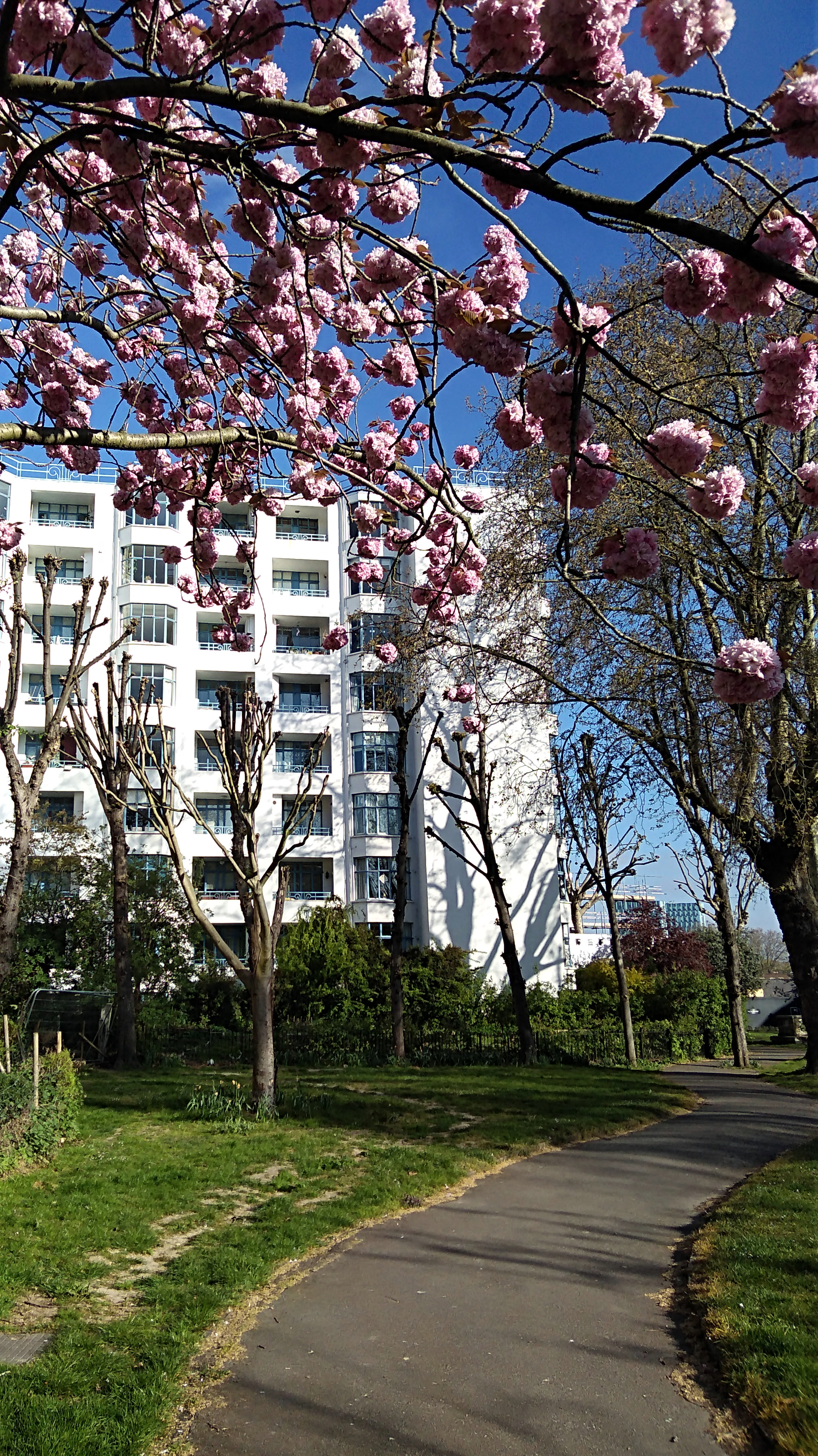
Trinity Court from St Andrew's Gardens

Trinity Court, Gray's Inn Road is a 9-storey / 8 floor Art Deco residential apartment block located at 254 Gray's Inn Road, London, built in between 1934 and 1935 by Taperell and Haase architectural practice.

The building comprises a total of 90 similarly sized flats. The flats were originally built as studios with a main living area with a pair of Murphy beds and built in cupboards, a separate kitchen and a bathroom, and balcony. Most have now been converted into small one bedroom flats in recent years (by having an open plan kitchen in the main living area and building a bedroom where the separate kitchen and bathroom used to be).

The name of the building comes from Holy Trinity Church, designed by Sir James Pennethorne and erected in 1837. Restored in 1880, it seated 1500 people and was in use until 1928. After the church closed, the ground was sold in 1931, and Trinity Court was built on the site a few years later. Trinity Court sits in the north-west corner of St Andrew's Gardens, a public park which was formerly the burial ground of the parish of St Andrew, Holborn.

Painted in white, with contrasting balconies and windows frames decorated in bleu celeste colour, the building featured in the 1986 London-based film Mona Lisa starring Bob Hoskins., and also in the 2016 film City of Tiny Lights, with Riz Ahmed, Cush Jumbo and Billie Piper. Both films feature a character who is a high class sex worker, living in Trinity Court. Both films also make use of the original cage lift for dramatic scenes of peril.

Despite its modernist and imposing Art Deco style, it does not appear on Historic England's documentation of Listed buildings.

Similar Art Deco residential buildings in London include Florin Court, Cholmeley Lodge and Du Cane Court.

== Gallery ==
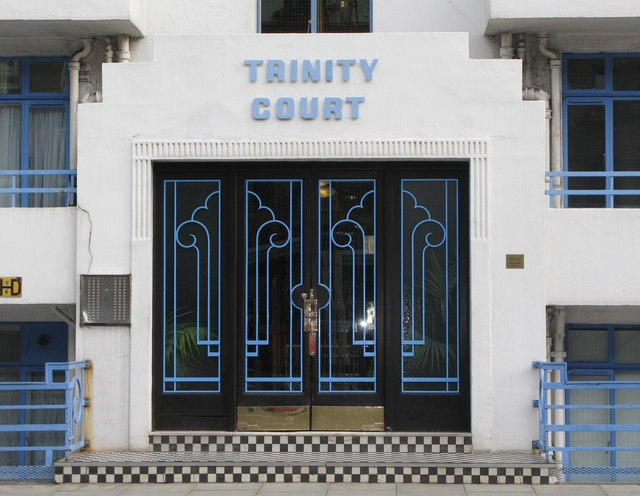
Trinity Court entrance

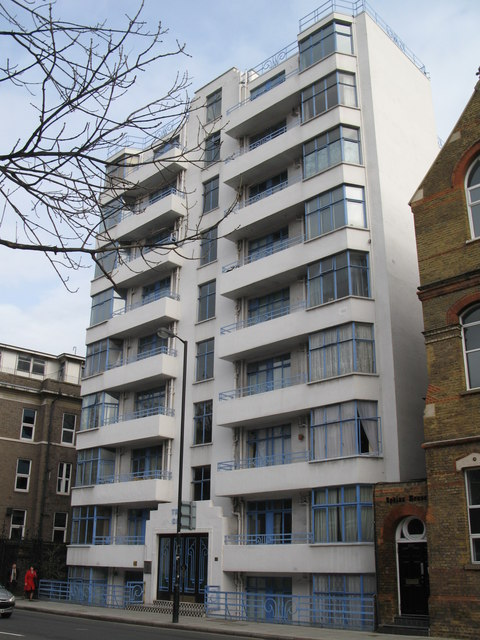
Trinity Court front side
