= Belsize Avenue =

Street in Hampstead, London

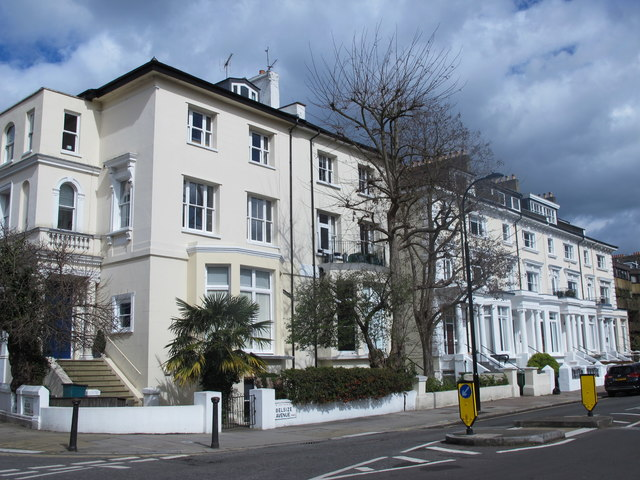
Houses in Belsize Avenue.

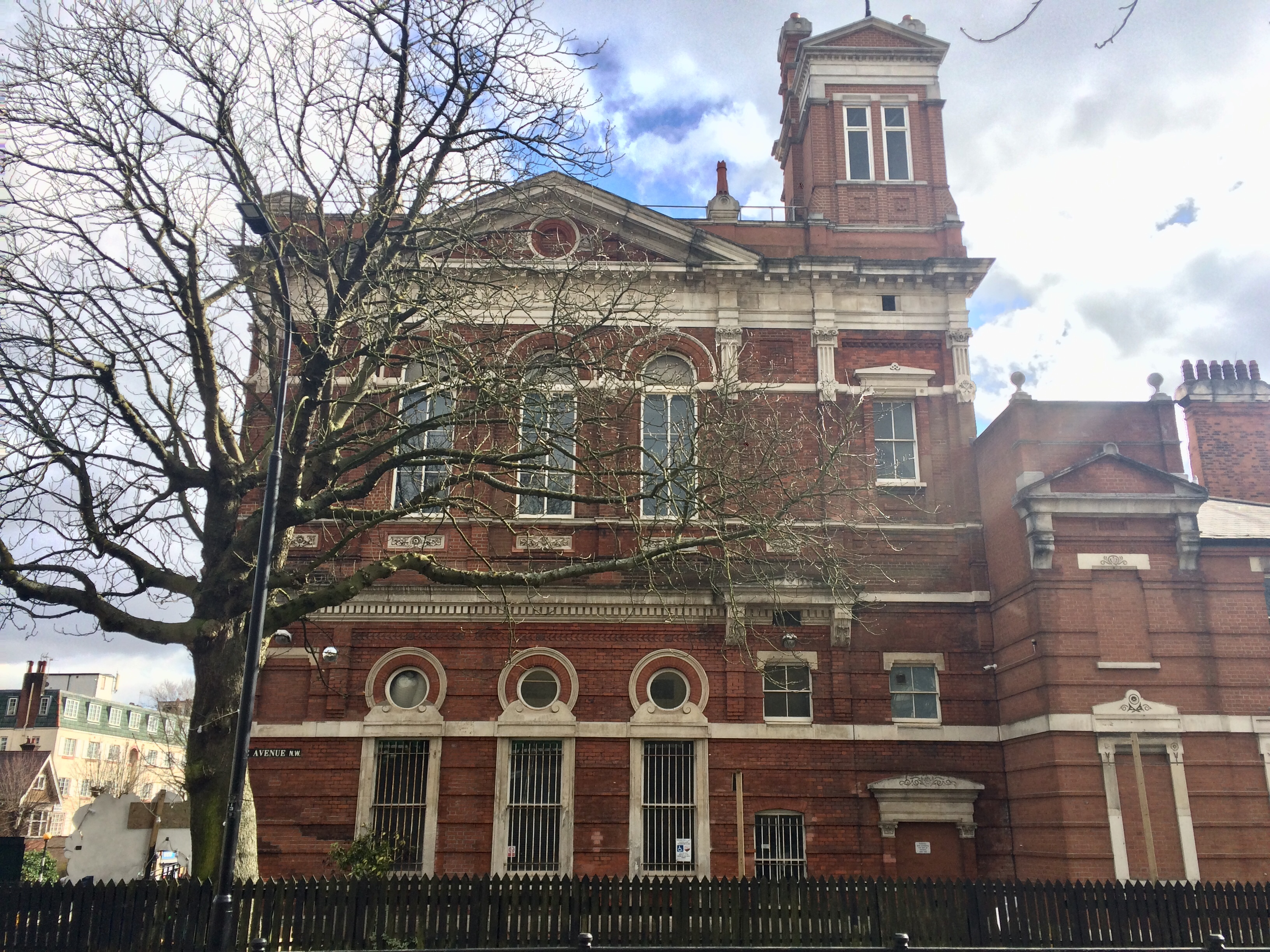
Side of Hampstead Town Hall facing onto Belsize Avenue.

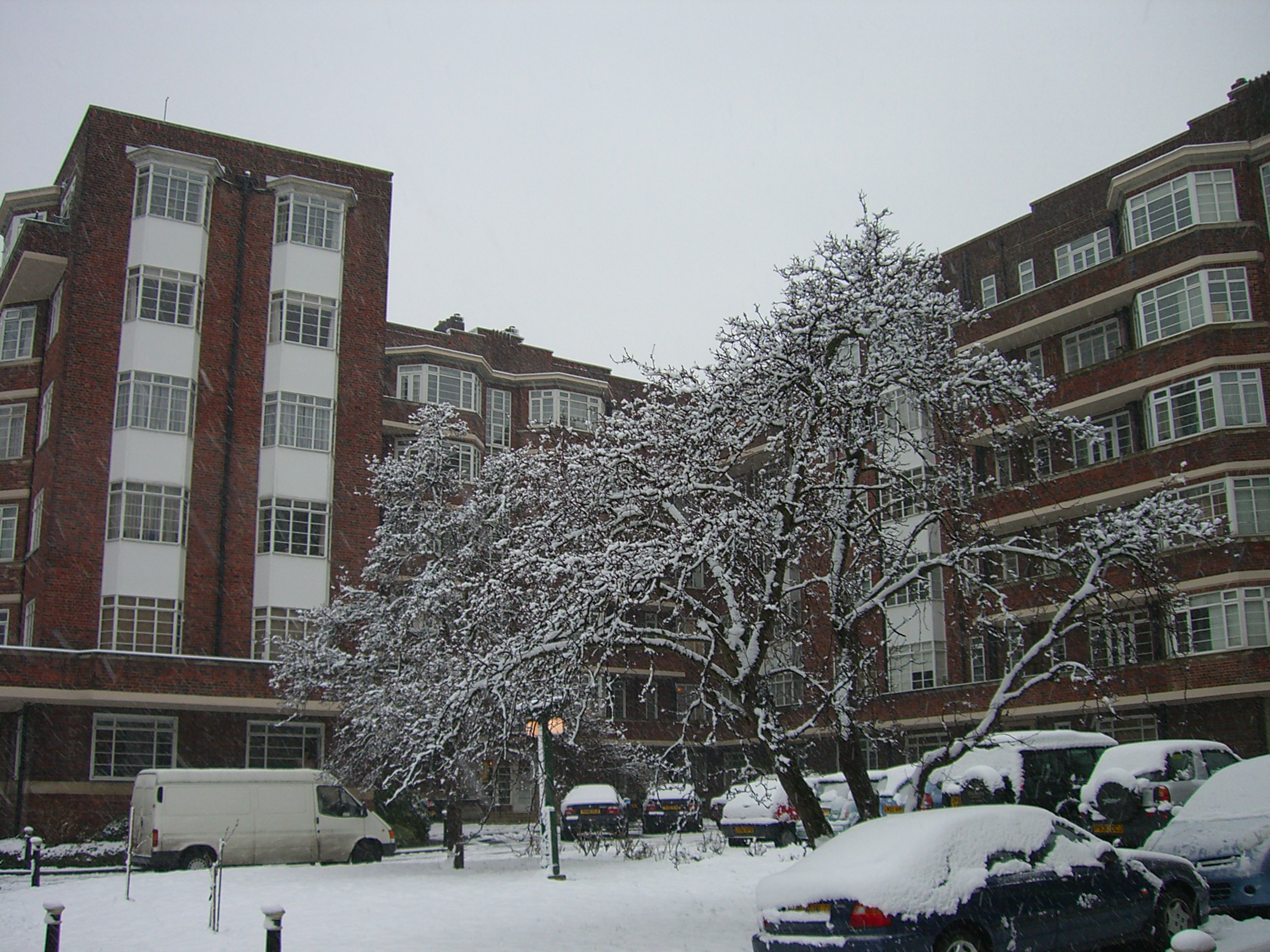
The Art Deco Hillfield Court.

Belsize Avenue is a street in the Belsize Park area of Hampstead. Located in the London Borough of Camden, it runs from Haverstock Hill westwards to a junction with Belsize Terrace and Belsize Park Gardens. It is the former carriageway approach to Belsize House, a country estate that occupied the area until it was demolished in 1853 to allow residential development. A number of houses in the street were built by William Willett around 1873.

At the junction of Belsize Avenue with Haverstock Hill is the former Hampstead Town Hall, now Grade II listed. Notable former residents of the streets have included the actor Gordon Harker and the future Japanese Prime Minister Takeo Fukuda. In the 1930s Hillfield Court, an Art Deco apartment block was built on previously undeveloped land, and the actress Diana Wynyard lived there at one point. In the same decade some former tennis courts were developed into Tudor Close, featuring Tudor-style architecture.

The street continues westward under the name Belsize Park until it reaches Fitzjohns Avenue, built on an area that was part of the gardens of Belsize House. Belsize Square runs off the street by St. Peter's Church. Most of the street's original 1850s white stucco buildings still survive.

== Bibliography ==
- Cherry, Bridget & Pevsner, Nikolaus. London 4: North. Yale University Press, 2002.
- Wade, Christopher. The Streets of Belsize. Camden History Society, 1991.
