= Du Cane Court =

Residential building in London, England

Coordinates: 51.441634°N 0.155522°W

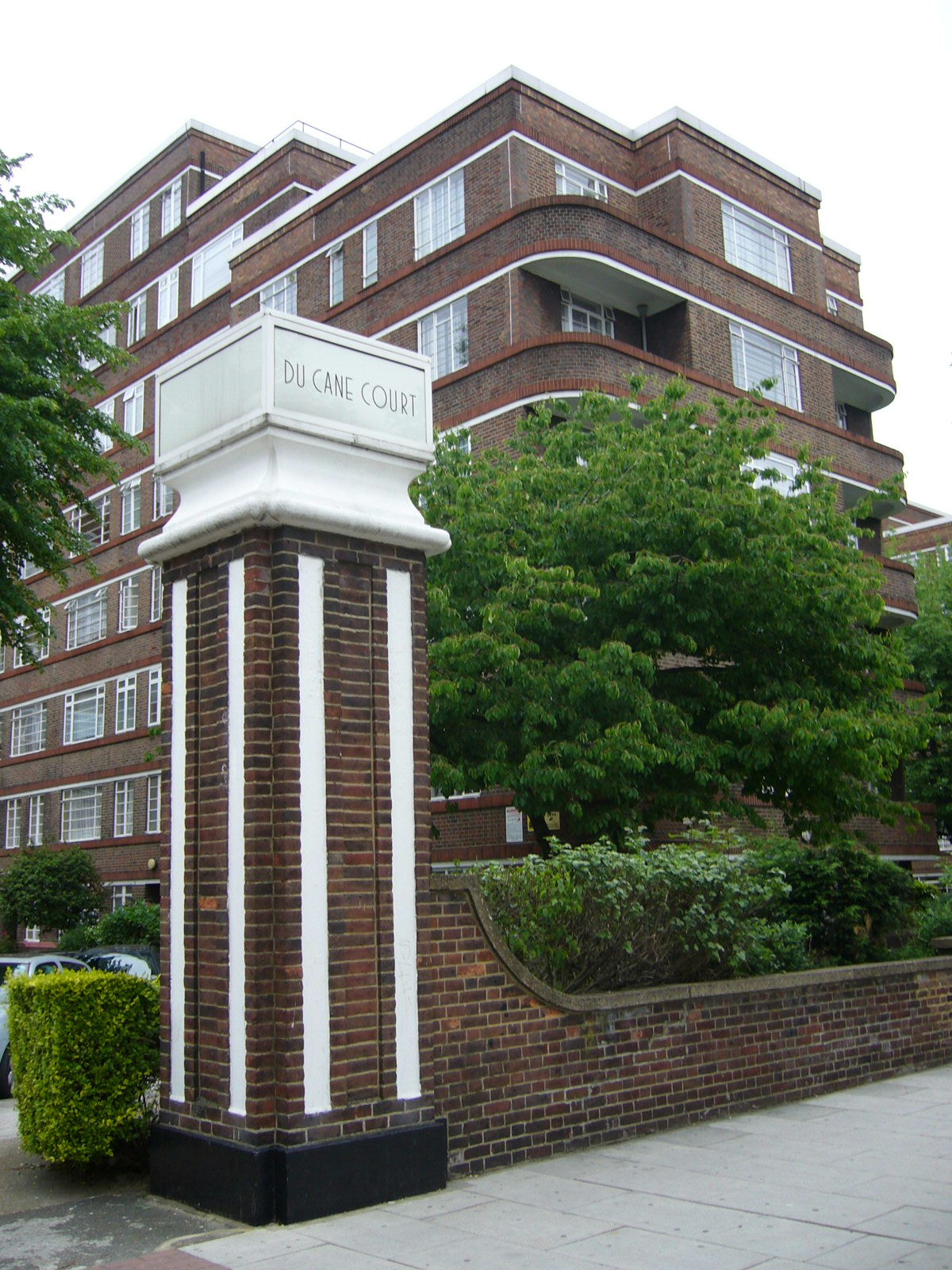
Du Cane Court

Du Cane Court is an Art Deco apartment block on Balham High Road, Balham, south London. A distinctive local landmark, it comprises 677 apartments and was believed to be Europe's largest privately owned apartment block when it was built in 1937.

It was a popular place to live for many music hall stars in the 1930s and 1940s and boasted a social club, on the top floor, before the area was converted into flats. Past residents have included the comedian Tommy Trinder. Currently comedian and writer Arthur Smith, the self-styled 'Bard of Balham', is a resident.

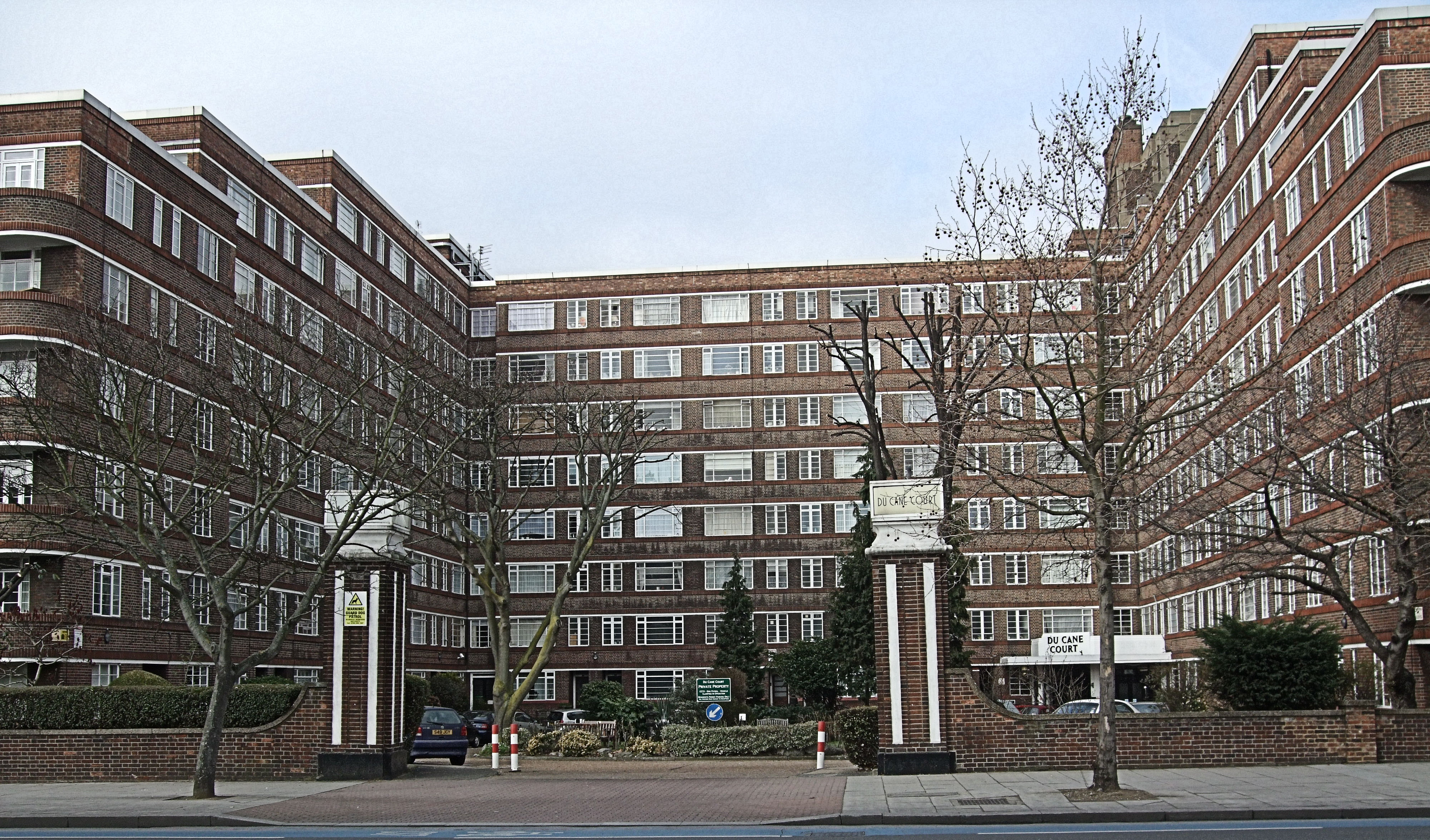
The building has 677 apartments

During the Second World War it was speculated that Du Cane Court had escaped bombing because it was planned for use by military officers in the event of a successful German invasion.

Similar Art Deco residential buildings in London include Florin Court, Cholmeley Lodge, Hillfield Court & Nell Gwynn House which was designed by the same architect George K. Green
