= Cholmeley Lodge =

Residential building in Haringey, London

Coordinates: 51°34′15.15″N 0°8′39.41″W

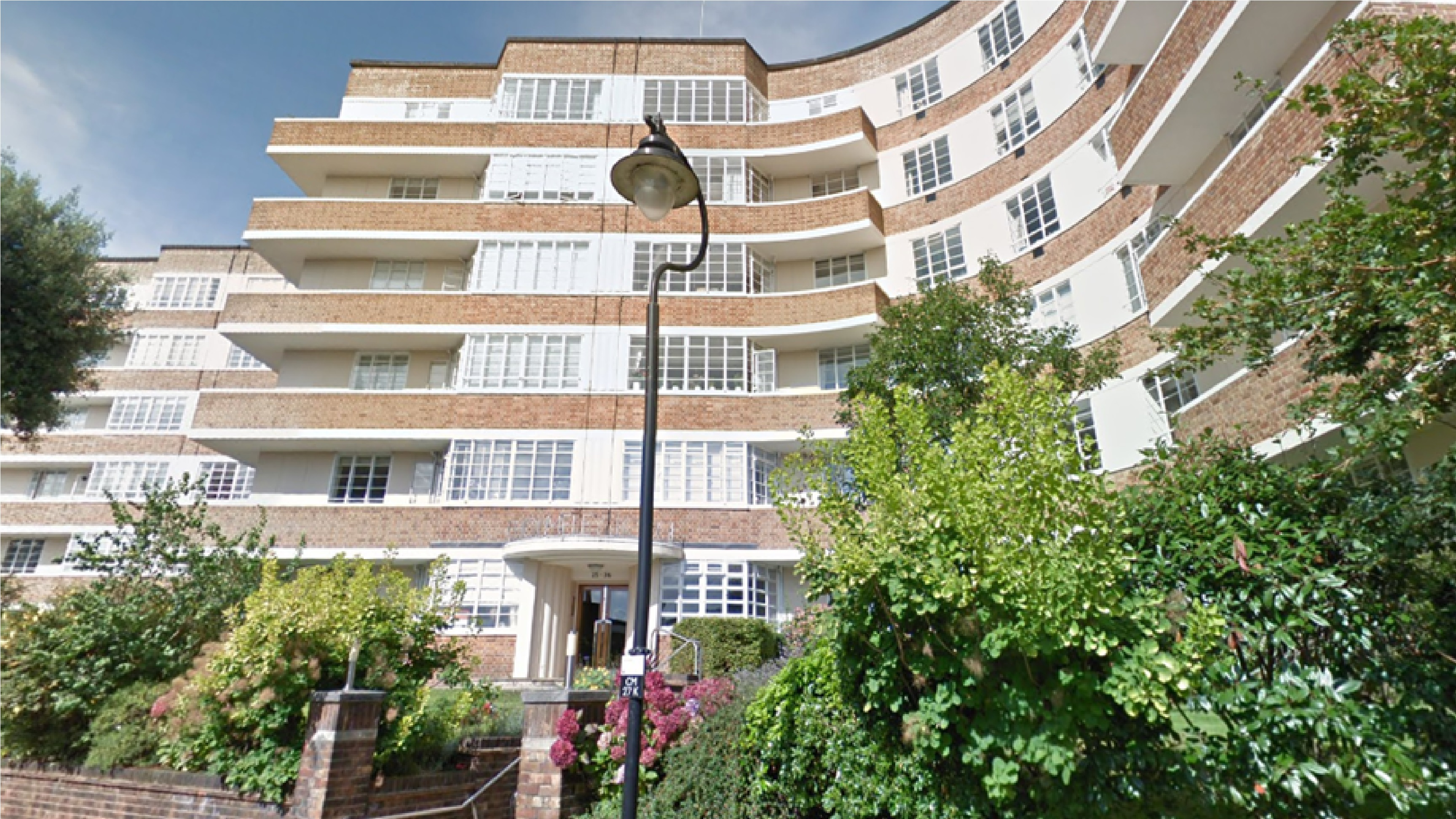
Cholmeley Lodge

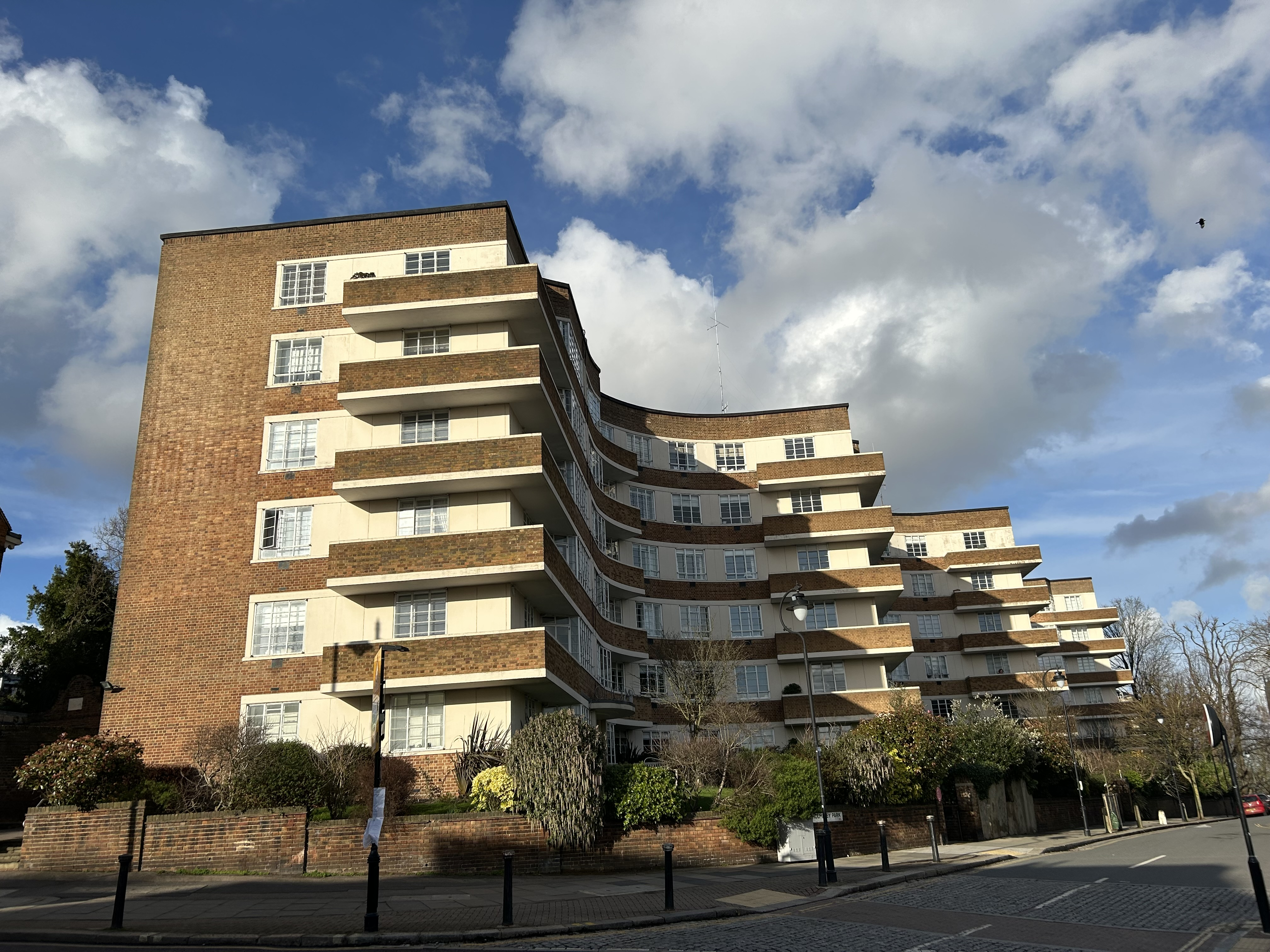
Chomley Lodge from the street

Cholmeley Lodge is an Art Deco / Streamline Moderne grade II listed residential building in Highgate, London, designed by architect Guy Leslie Llewellyn Morgan (1903-1987).

Built in 1934 and taking its name from Sir Roger Cholmeley, (pronounced 'Chumlee') who owned the land until 1565, it is a curving six-storey block of 48 flats, according to a 2006 Haringey Council report on the Highgate Conservation Area. although the listing status refers to 54 flats in the block, with an unusual three curved concave blocks spanning a 30-foot (9.1 m) radius.

It would later inspire the design of another, more famous apartment block built by Guy Morgan in London: Florin Court.

Cholmeley Lodge was originally proposed and planned to be built on Bournemouth seafront, but the local council did not approve the modern design, requiring some Tudor-style timberwork to soften the elevation.

Being thus refused, the project was moved to the London Borough of Haringey and built facing Highgate Hill by replacing the Mermaid Inn, at 126 Highgate Hill, which was closed in 1679 and later demolished.

== See also ==
- Florin Court
- Du Cane Court
- Trinity Court, Gray’s Inn Road
