= Florin Court =

Art Deco - Streamline Moderne residential building in London

Coordinates: 51°31′15.35″N 0°05′55.35″W

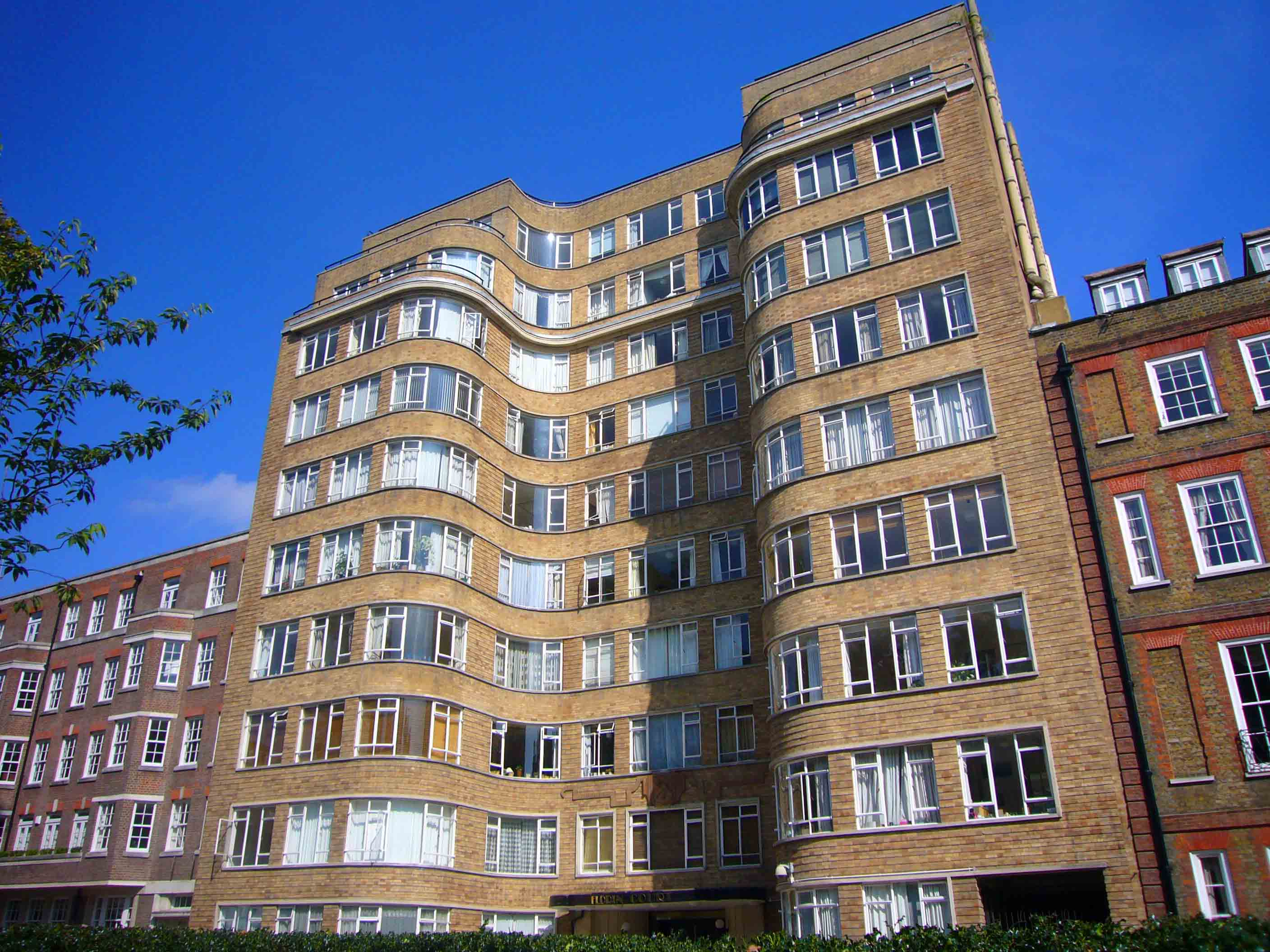
- Interactive map of the Florin Court area

General information
- Type: Residential
- Location: Charterhouse Square; London, EC1; United Kingdom
- Completed: 1936; 90 years ago

Technical details
- Floor count: 9

Design and construction
- Architects: Guy Morgan and Partners

Florin Court is an Art Deco / Streamline Moderne Grade II residential building on the eastern side of Charterhouse Square in Smithfield, London.

== History ==
Built in 1936 by Guy Morgan and Partners who worked until 1927 for Edwin Lutyens, and two years earlier successfully completed the similar Cholmeley Lodge in Highgate, it features an impressive curved façade with projecting wings, a roof garden, setbacks on the eighth and ninth floor and a basement swimming pool.

It was probably the earliest of the residential apartment blocks in the wider Clerkenwell area, immediately north of the City of London, Metropolitan Borough of Finsbury, now Islington. The walls were built with beige bricks, specially made by Williamson Cliff Ltd (based in Stamford, Lincolnshire), and placed over a steel frame.

Regalian properties refurbished the building in the late 1980s, to designs by Hildebrand & Clicker architects, providing today's interior layout and more facilities.

Before the refurbishment, the ground floor included a porter's office and a flat for the head porter; the entrance hall had a marble floor inset with the arms of Charterhouse (now carpeted), and an inlaid ceiling covered the outside of the entrance door, before being plastered. In the basement, there were a public restaurant, a cocktail bar, and a clubroom. Behind the block, a single-storey building contained two squash courts (modified in 2015 into a two floors office space renamed "Florin Court Studios").

The three-story Georgian buildings that stood between 6-9 Charterhouse Square before Florin Court used to be a vicarage and a lady's school until 1859, that was later converted into a staff dormitory once purchased in 1872 by Copestake, Crampton & Co. Ltd (lace manufacturers and wholesalers located in Cheapside). Copestake, Crampton & Co. Ltd employees' hostel housed up to 100 male and 18 female, but once the company started to move to Nottingham the building was sold to balance part of the loss due to the business slowing down around 1934.

In 2003, the building was listed Grade II.

On Saturday 20 July 2013, a flat on the first floor caught fire and the building had to be evacuated. Consequently, the curved façade required major restoration work that lasted for nearly a year, as some of the original materials used in the 1930s had to be sourced and found within the UK.

== Layout ==
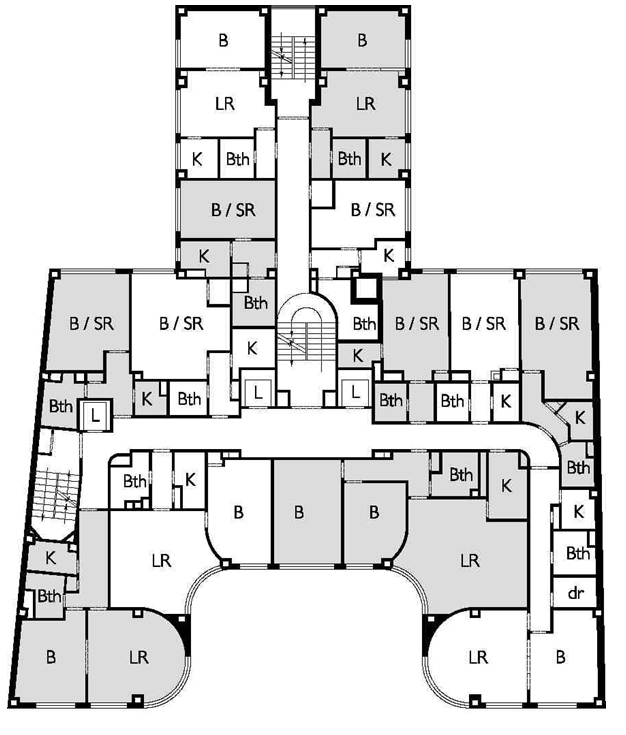
Floor plan of Florin Court

The building is composed of nine floors and has a total of 120 flats. In the basement are a swimming pool, a sauna, a gym, a lounge room with a small library, a Wi-Fi area, a laundry room and a garage. All spaces are communal and access is free to all residents. There are two lifts.

== On screen ==
The building has been used as Whitehaven Mansions, the fictional London residence of Agatha Christie's character Hercule Poirot, in the LWT television series Agatha Christie's Poirot (1989–2013). As well as exterior filming, a number of interior shots of the building were used for this programme over the 24 years of production.

In March 2019 the building was again extensively filmed, after being selected as home and neighbourhood of one of the leading characters of the Batman spin-off Pennyworth.

In 2022 the exterior was featured in the film See How They Run as the home of characters Melvyn Cocker-Norris and Gio.

== Image gallery ==
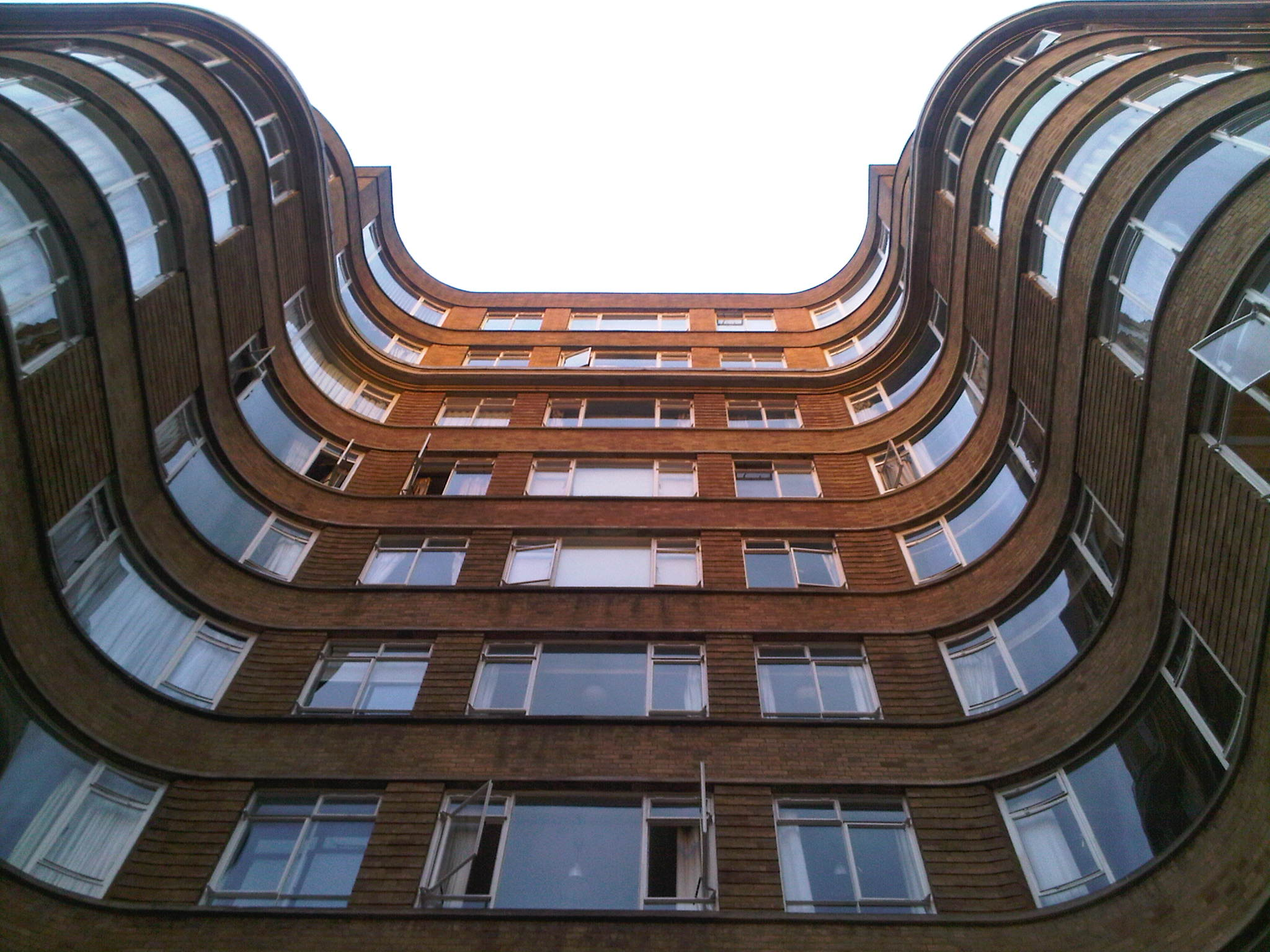
Curved façade

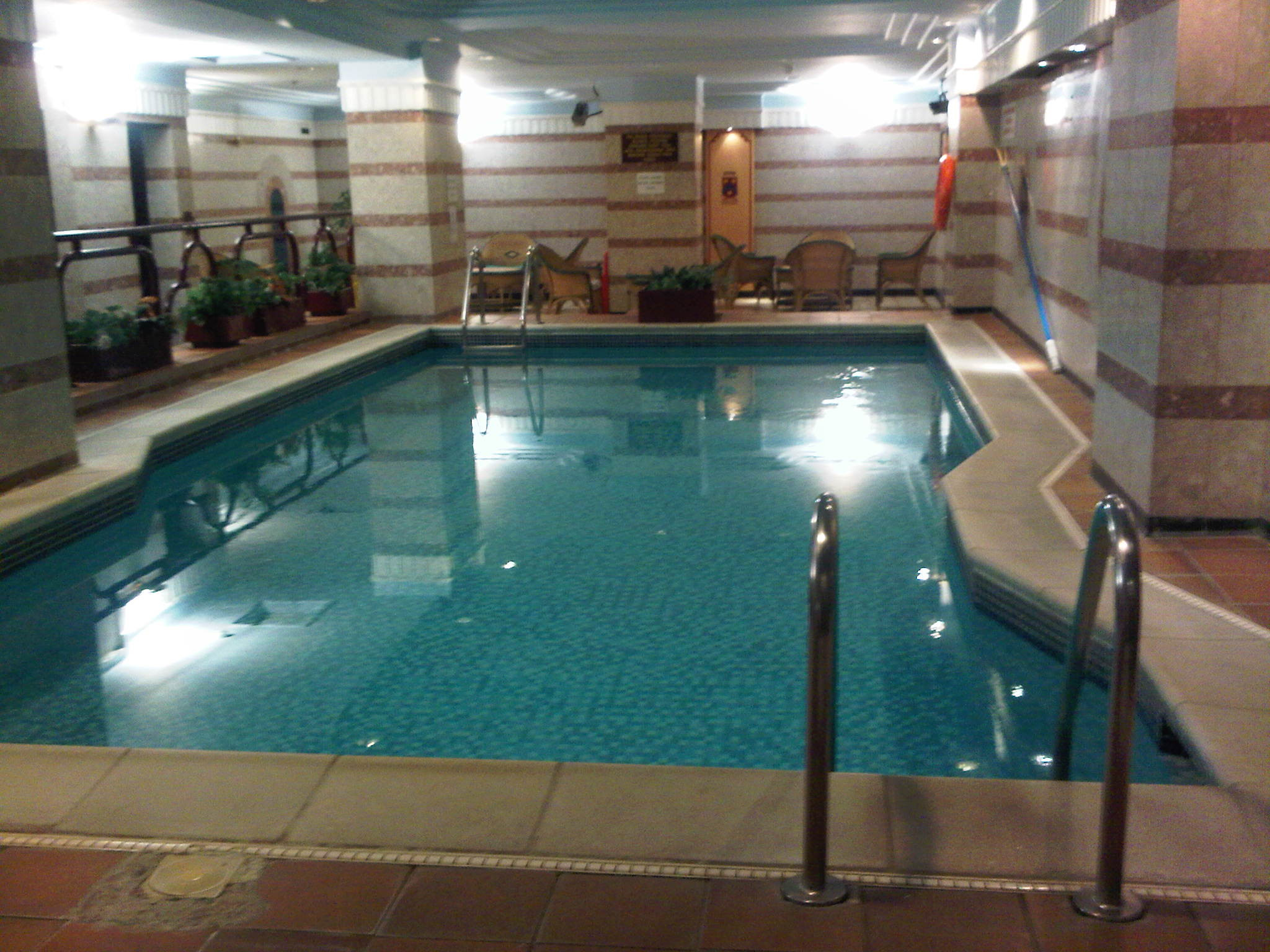
Swimming pool

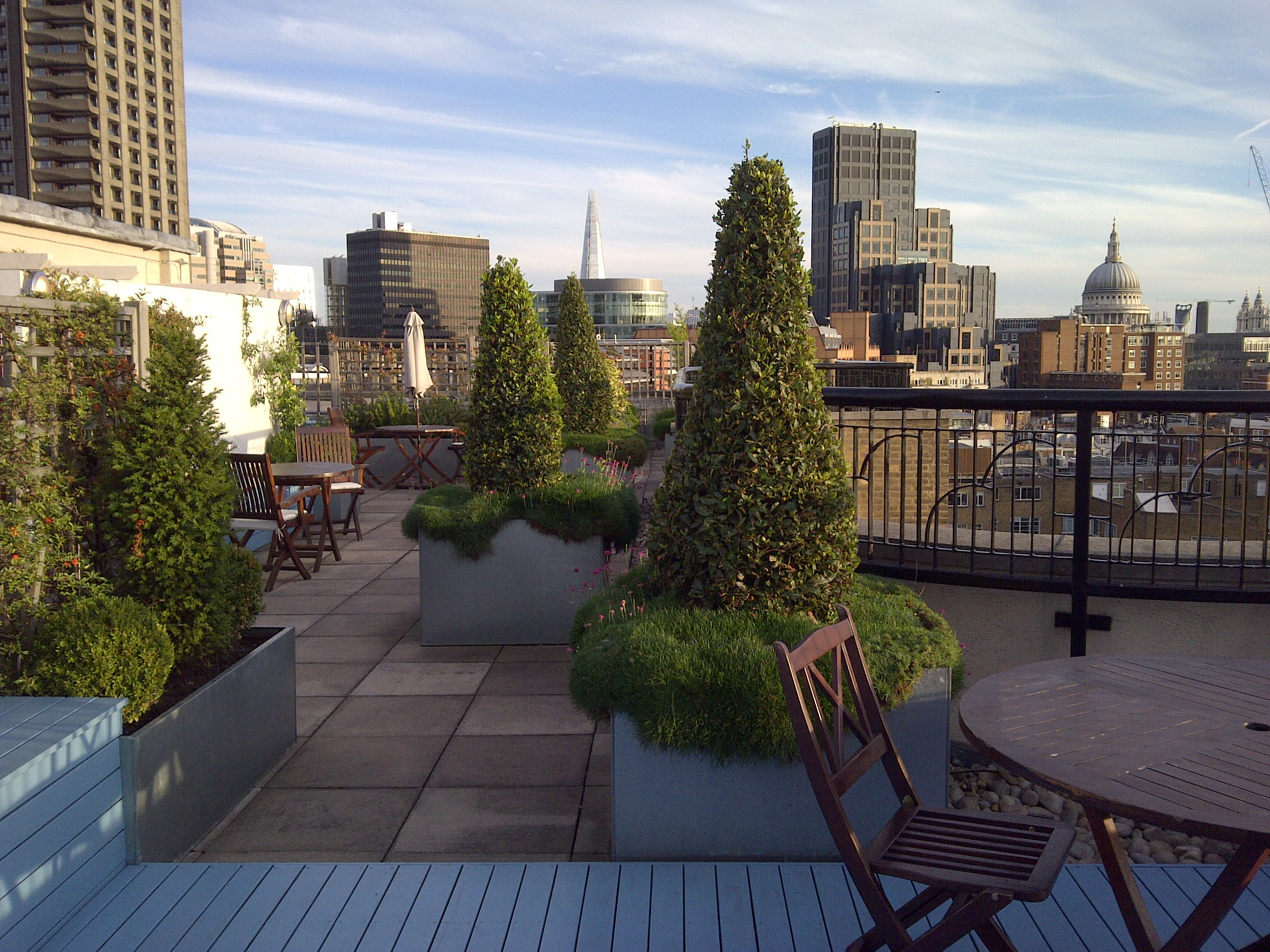
Garden roof terrace

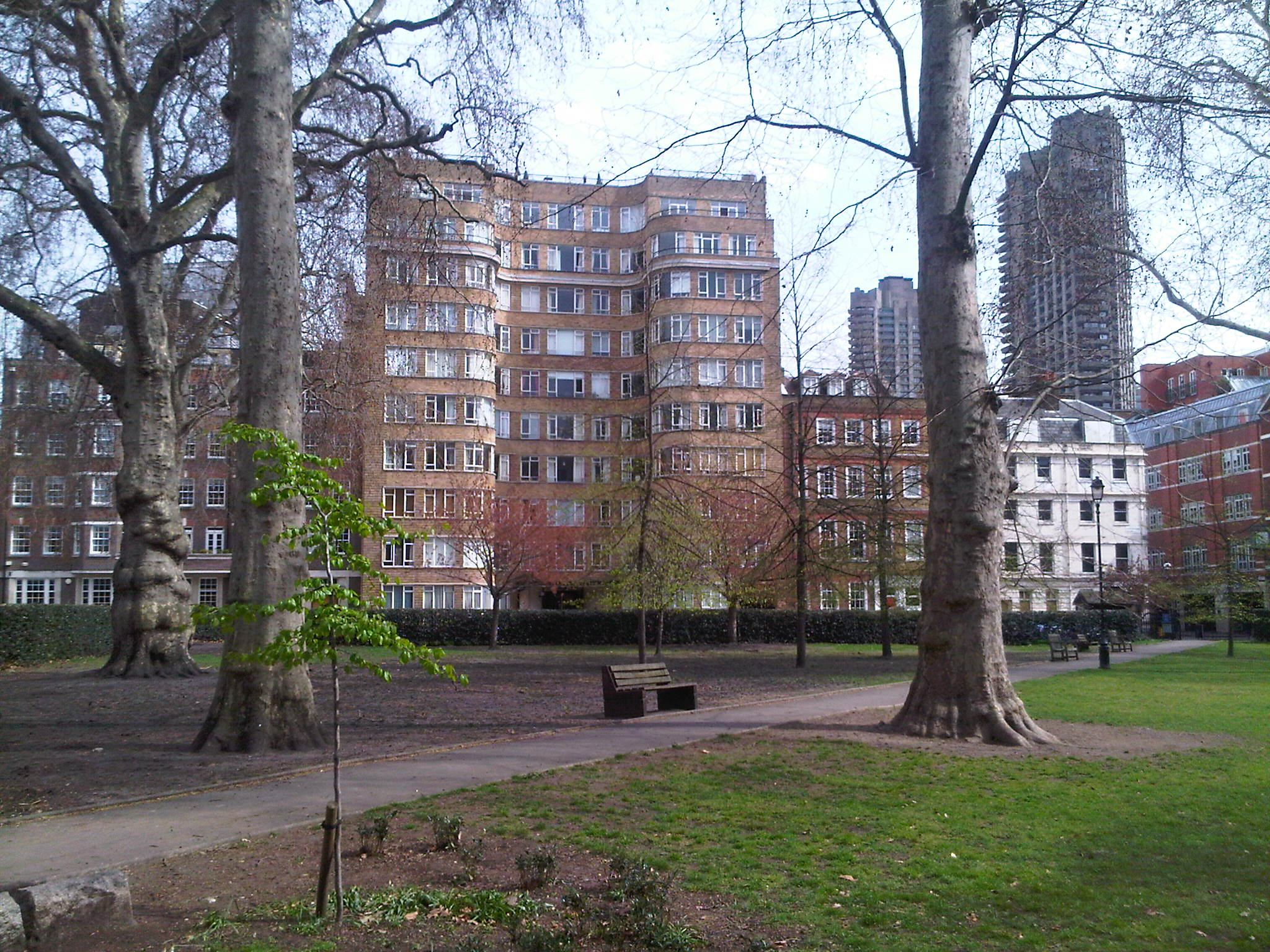
Florin Court from Charterhouse Square garden

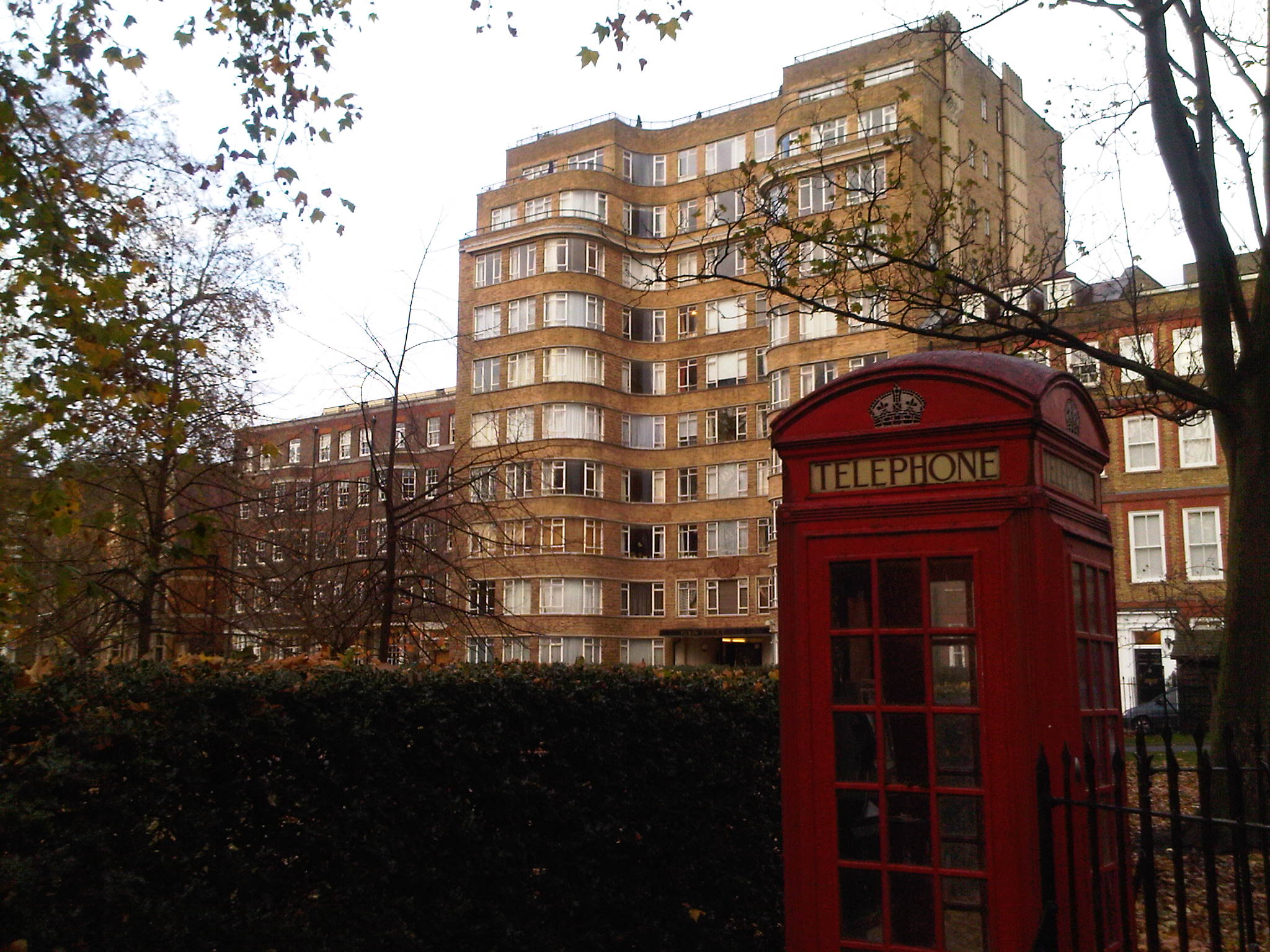
Florin Court from Charterhouse Street

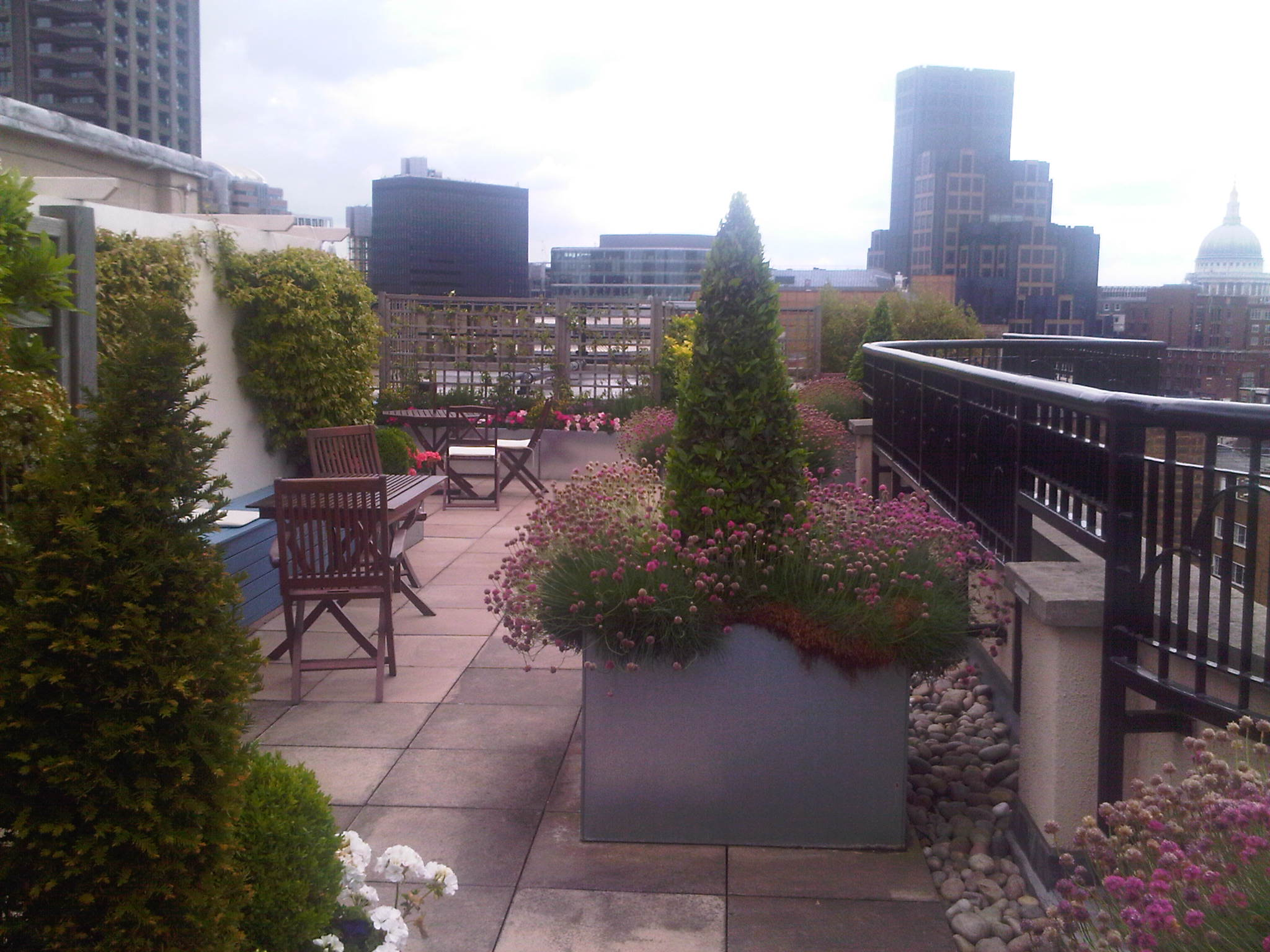
Florin Court roof terrace

Leisure Centre

Fire at Florin Court

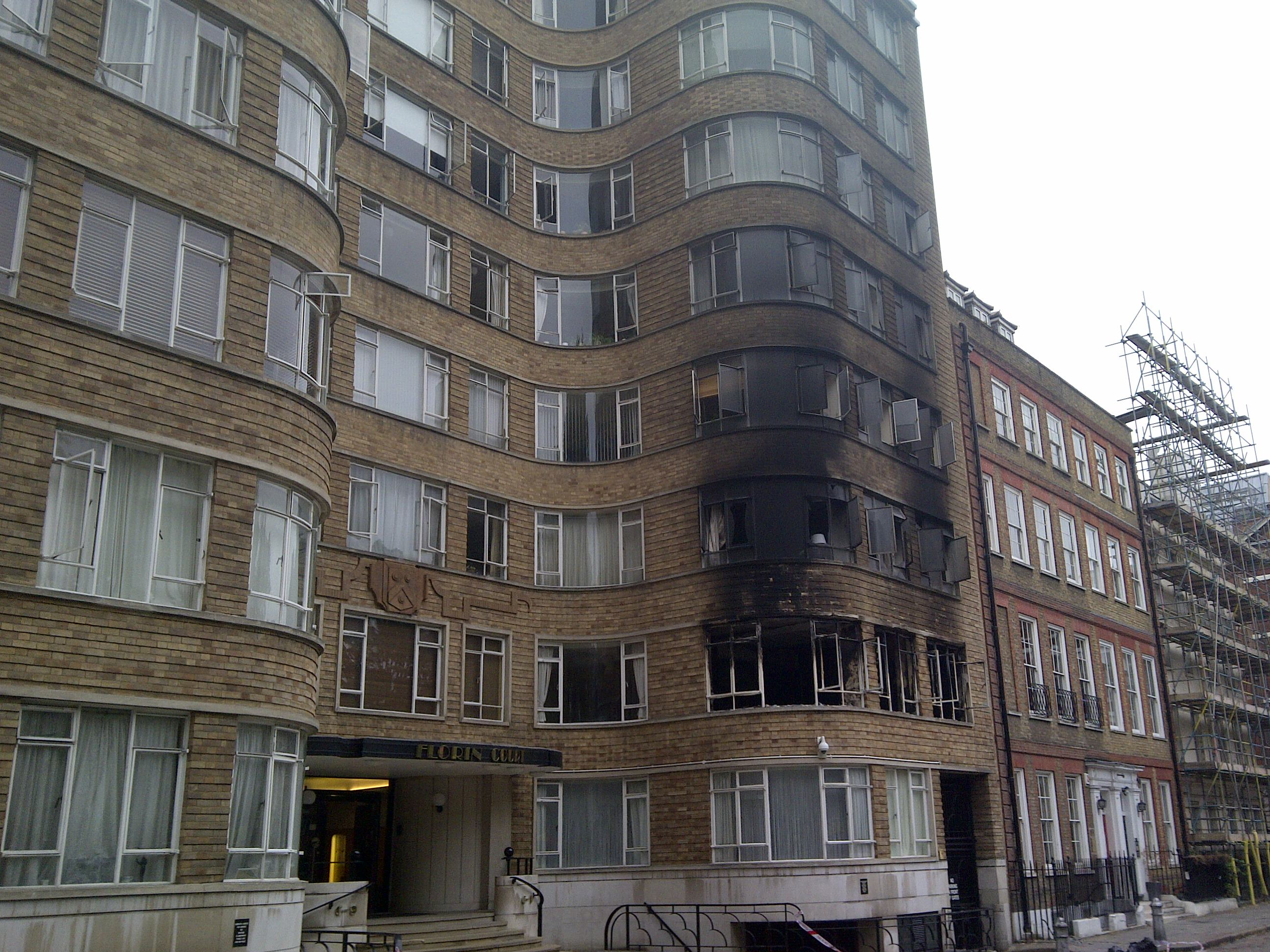
Fire damage at Florin Court

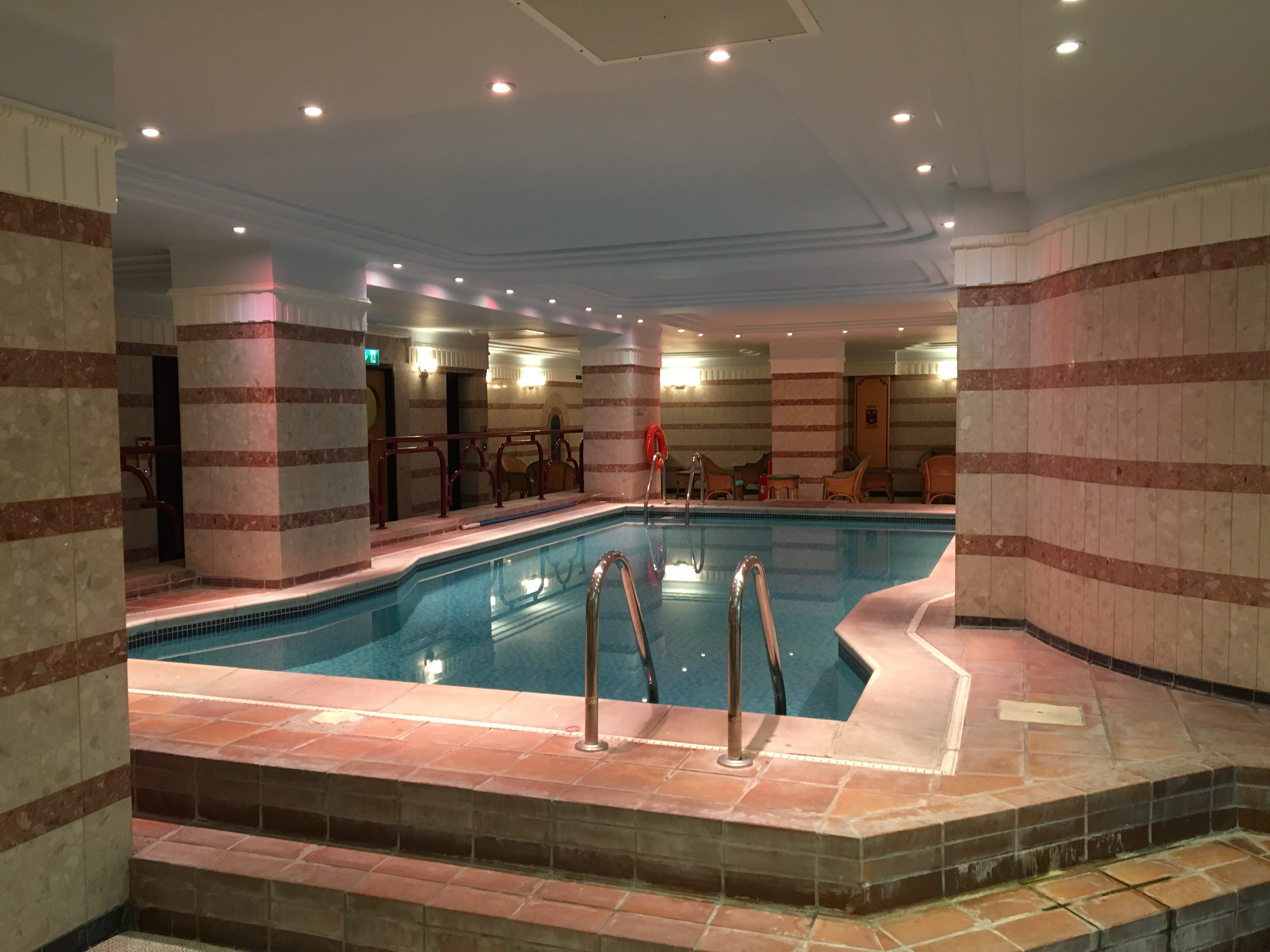
Florin Court swimming pool after refurbishment

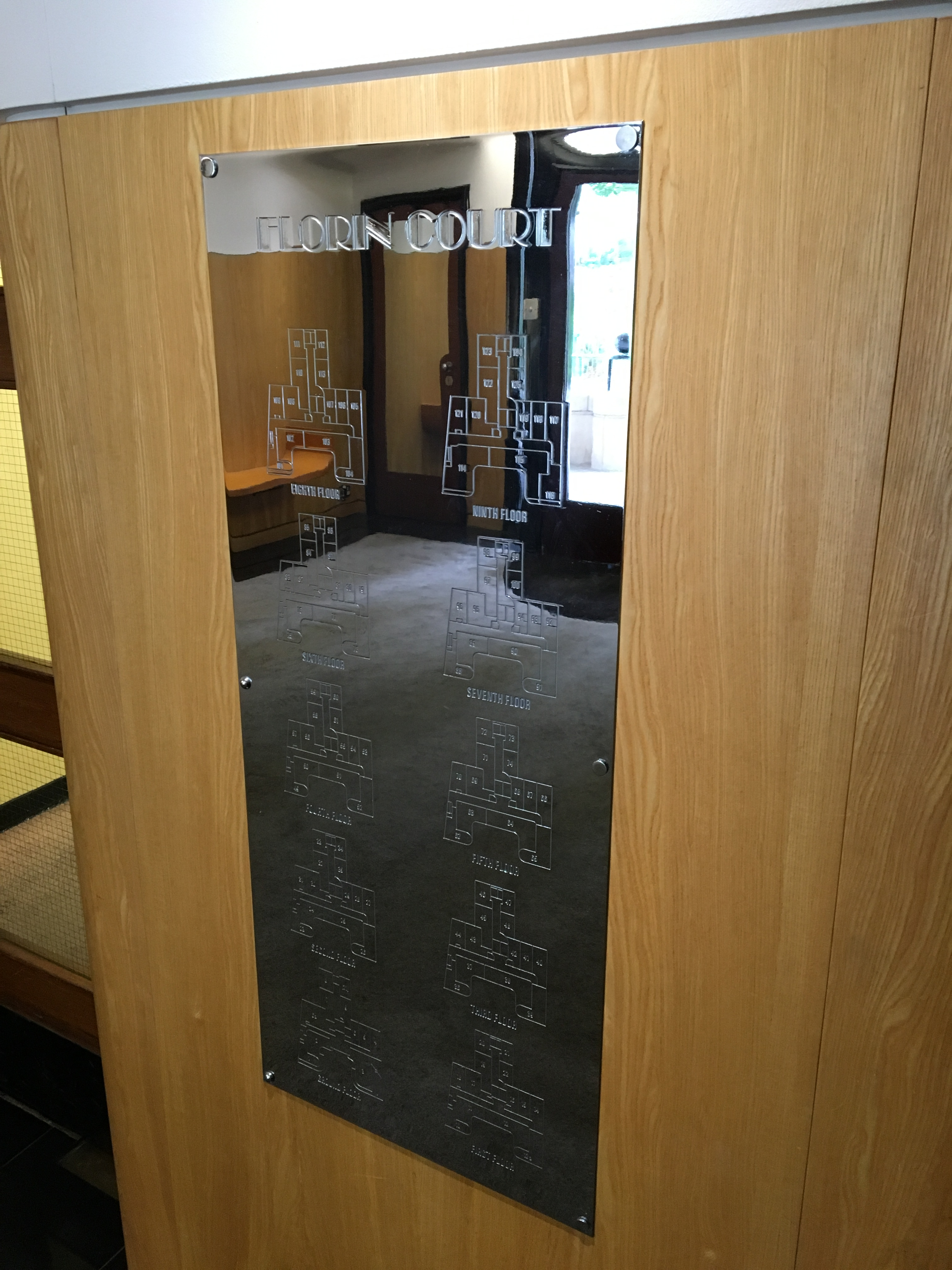
Floor plan at Florin Court

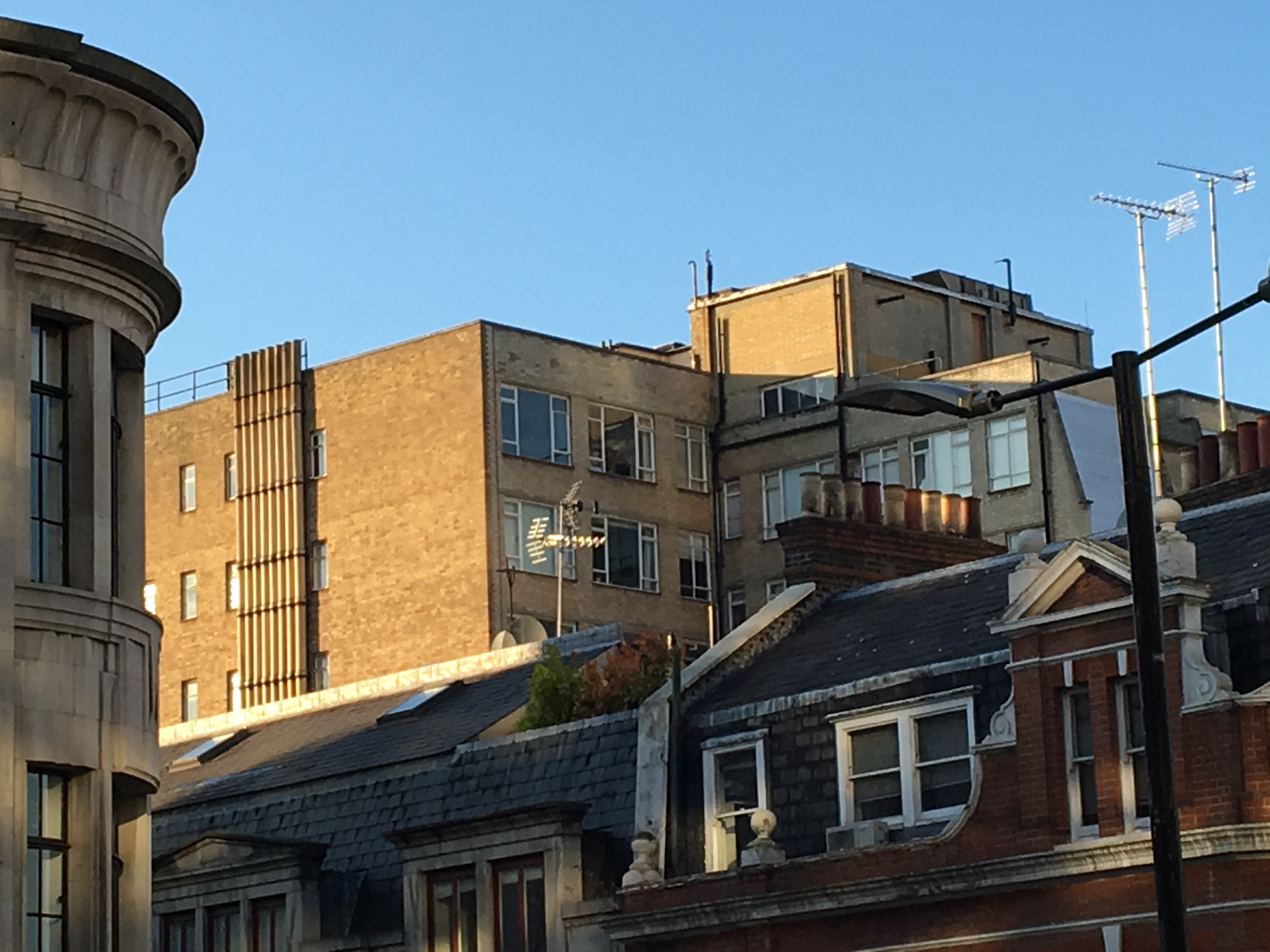
Florin Court back side

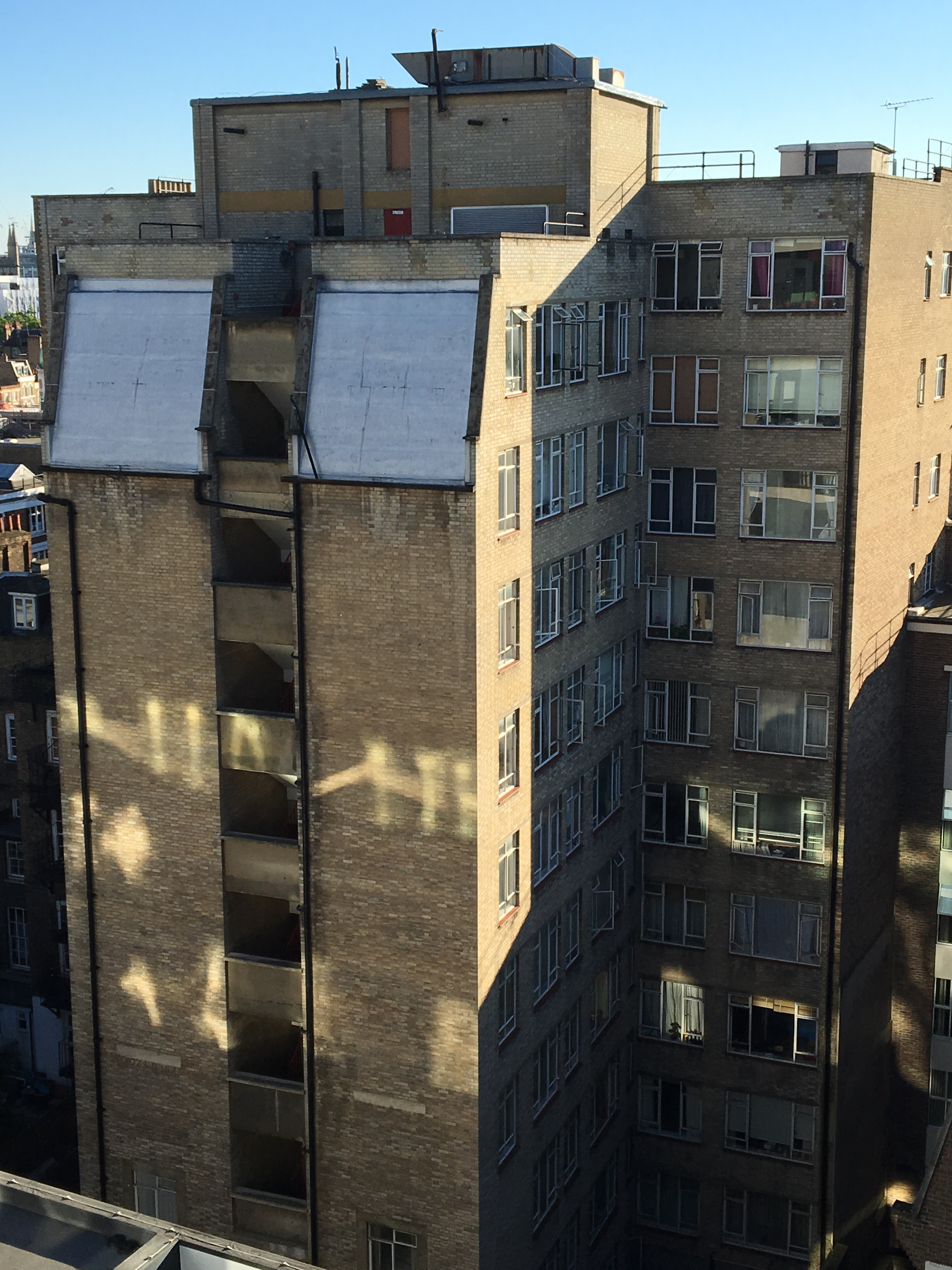
Back side - Florin Court

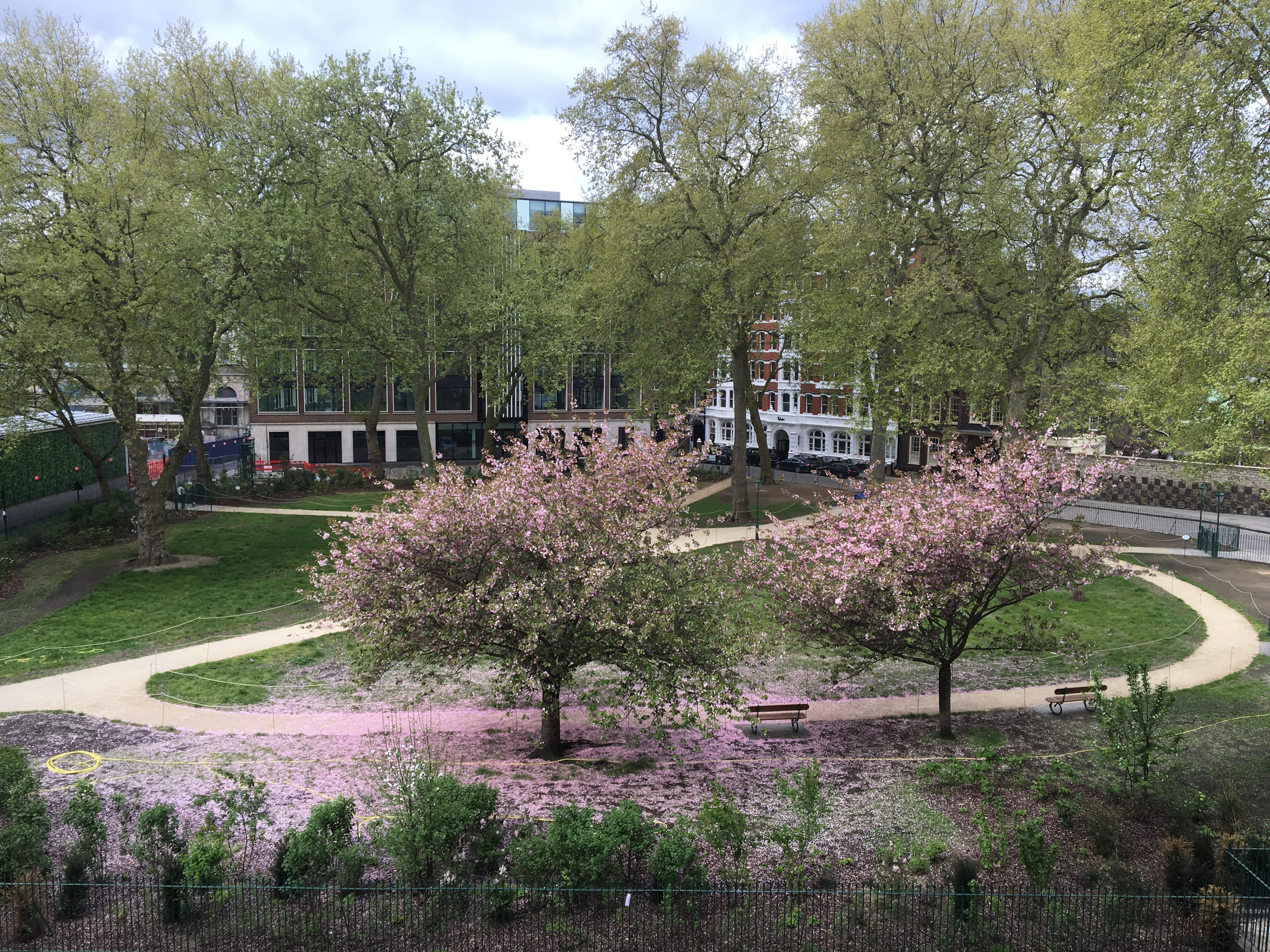
Charterhouse Square from Florin Court

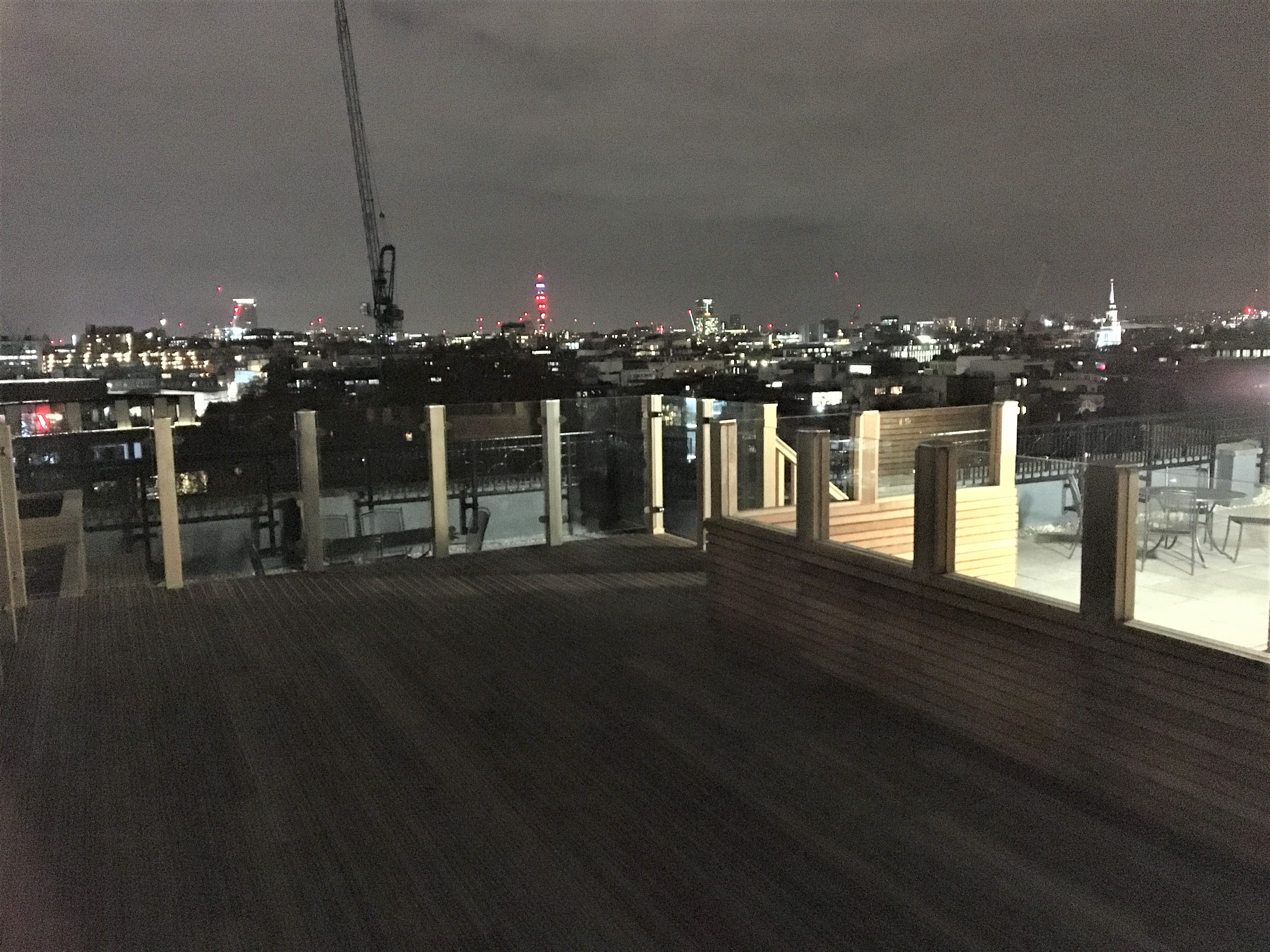
Florin Court roof terrace at night

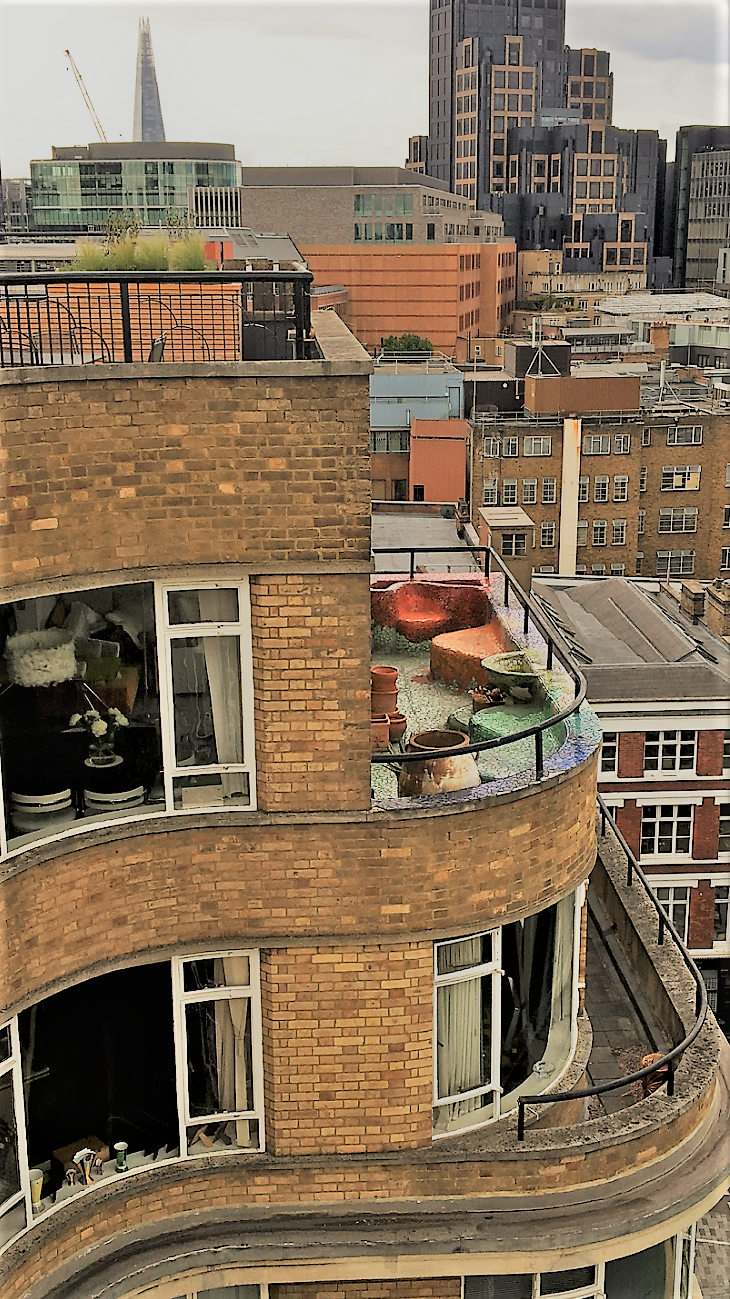
Florin Court setbacks and balconies
