= Carlton Cinema, Essex Road =

Former cinema in Islington, London, England

Carlton Cinema
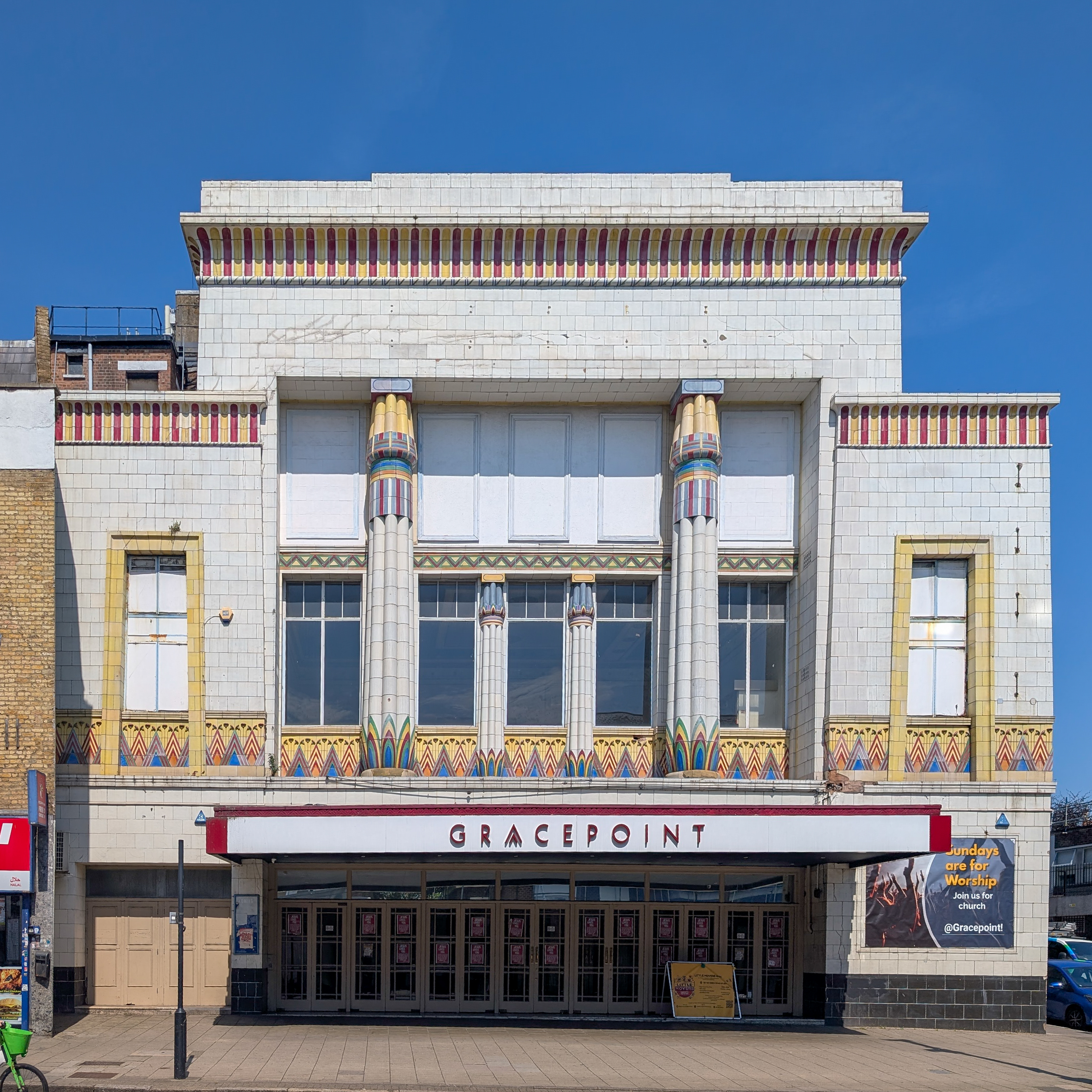
- The building in 2026
- Interactive map of the Carlton Cinema area

General information
- Architectural style: Art Deco
- Location: Essex Road, Islington
- Coordinates: 51.5404°N 0.0971°W
- Opened: 1930
- Renovated: 2015
- Governing body: Resurrection Manifestations (church)

Design and construction
- Architect: George Coles

Other information
- Seating capacity: 2,226
- Public transit: Essex Road; Highbury & Islington; Angel

Listed Building – Grade II*
- Designated: 16 January 1974
- Reference no.: 1292870

The former Carlton Cinema (and then Mecca Bingo) is an Art Deco Grade II* listed building, located at 161–169 Essex Road, Islington, London. It was completed in 1930 as a cine-variety theatre with a capacity of 2,226 seats.

== Building ==
Architect George Coles is now famous for the many Art Deco cinemas he designed, including the Troxy in Stepney (1933), the Odeon, Muswell Hill (1936-6), and the Gaumont State Cinema in Kilburn (1937).

The Carlton Cinema was an early foray into his signature style, with an Egyptian influence. The discovery of Tutankhamun’s tomb in November 1922 had contributed to a brief "Egyptomania" and influenced the Art Deco style and the buildings erected in that period, particularly cinemas and theatres.

The building's façade is covered in black, white and coloured faience, with other walls in yellow brick. The façade has a stylized frieze of lotus flowers in coloured faience running around the ground and upper floors.

Inside, the building is mainly Empire style, with Egyptian decorations in the foyer, while the auditorium has a French Renaissance style.

In 2024, the building was one of many in Islington that was considered "at risk," but benefited from a renovation in 2025.

== History ==
The cinema opened in 1930 with a screening of Welcome Danger.

Carlton Cinema was taken over by Associated British Cinemas Ltd. (ABC) in February 1935, and was famous for "ABC Minors" Saturday morning screenings.

In 1972, the building was converted into the Mecca Bingo Club, a bingo hall which operated for almost 35 years until March 2007.

It was purchased by an evangelical Christian church Resurrection Manifestations in 2007, and reopened in 2015 as Gracepoint, a 900 capacity venue available for hire and an active church.

== In popular culture ==
The façade and foyer of the building appear as the Roxy Cinema in episode 2 series 5 of Endeavour, titled Cartouche.

== Gallery ==
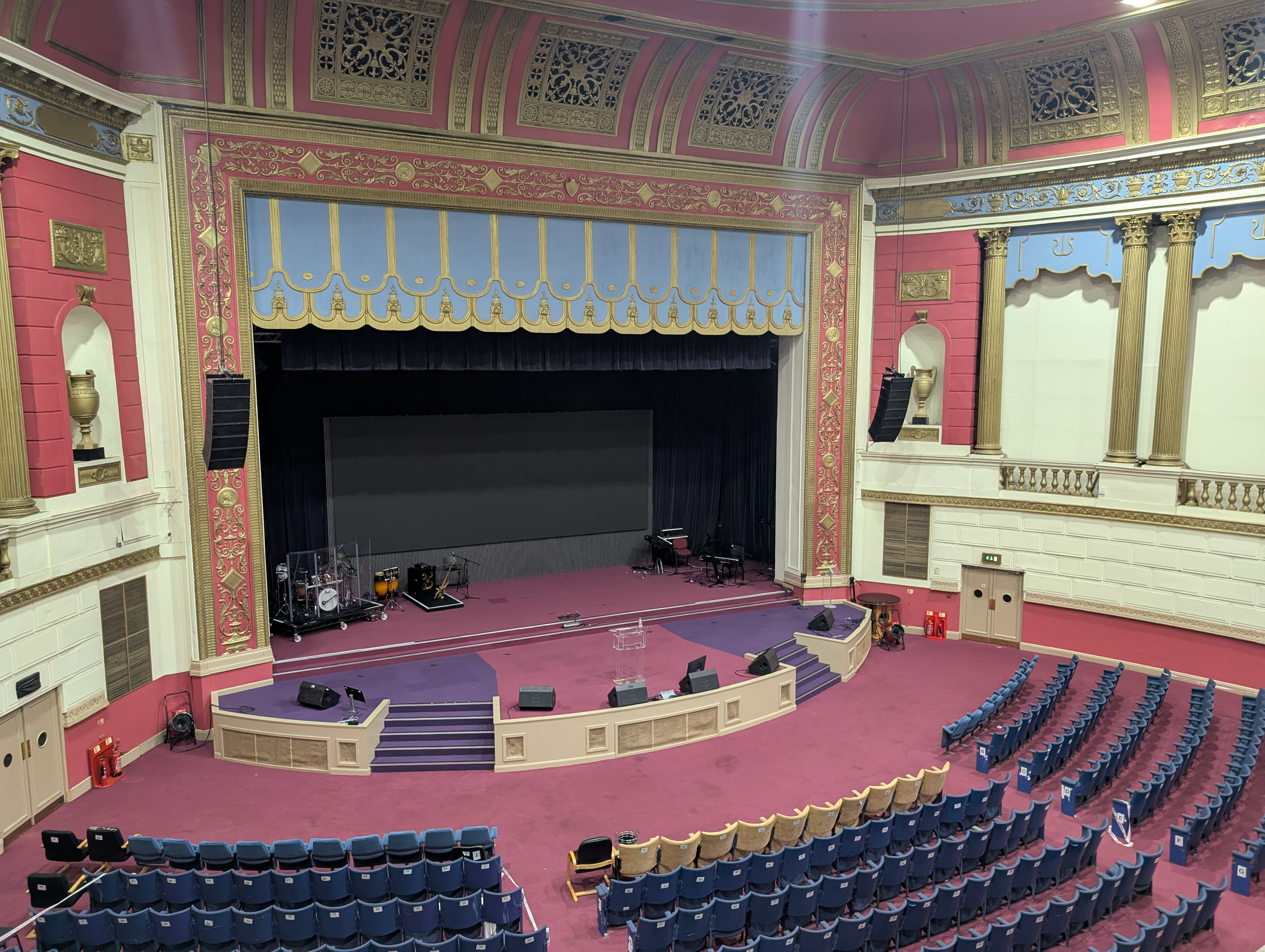
Auditorium in 2026

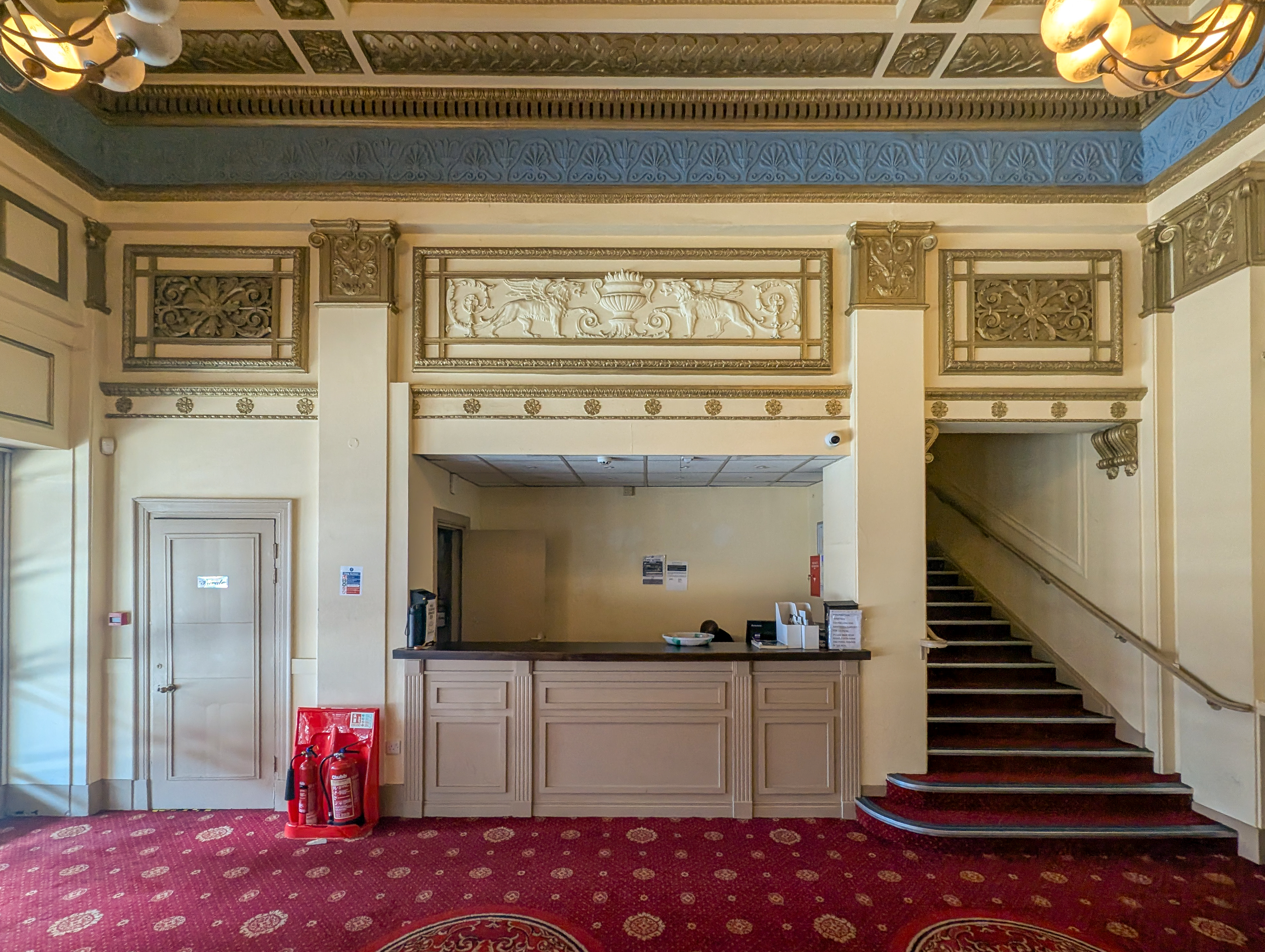
Foyer in 2026

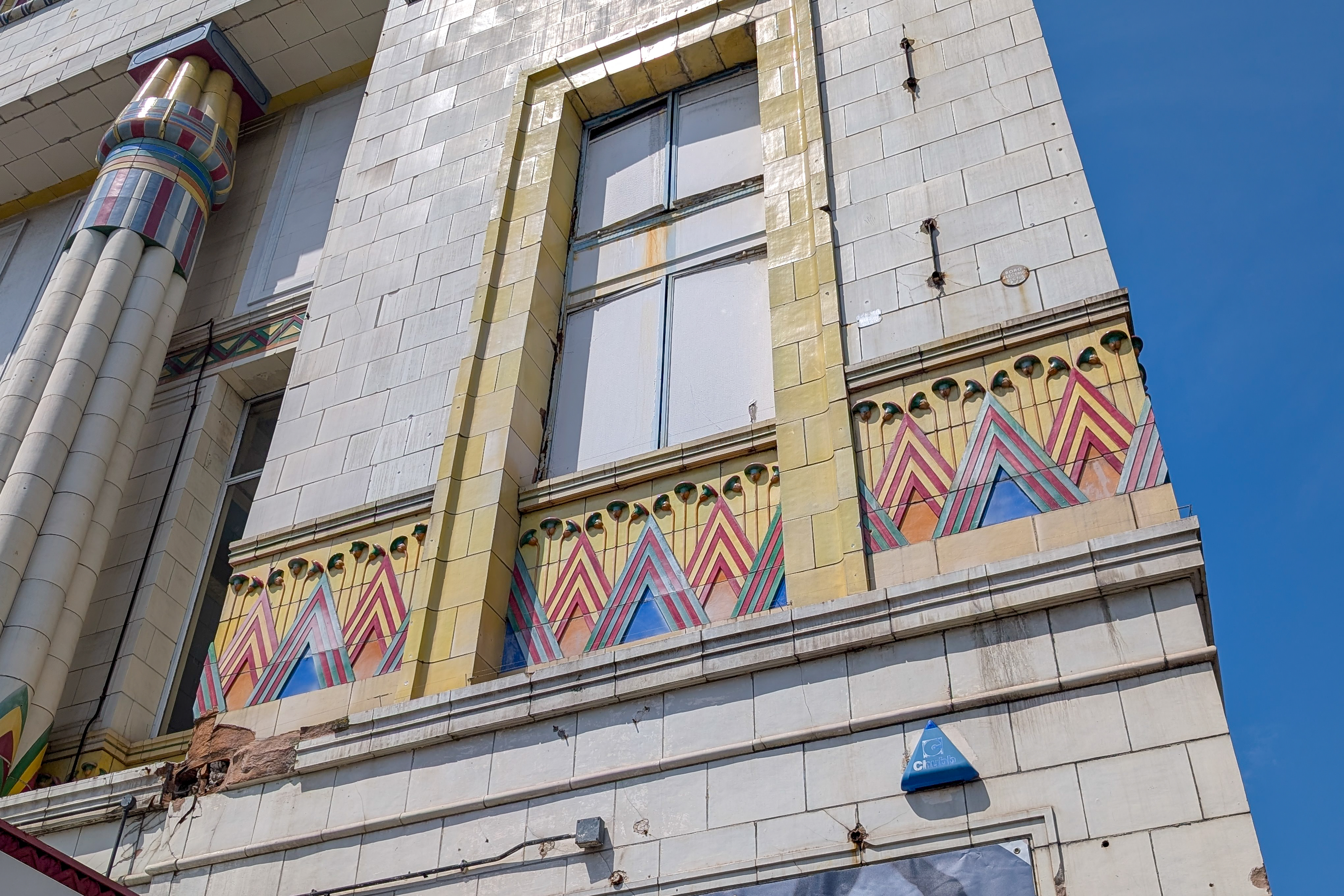
Detail of the coloured frieze

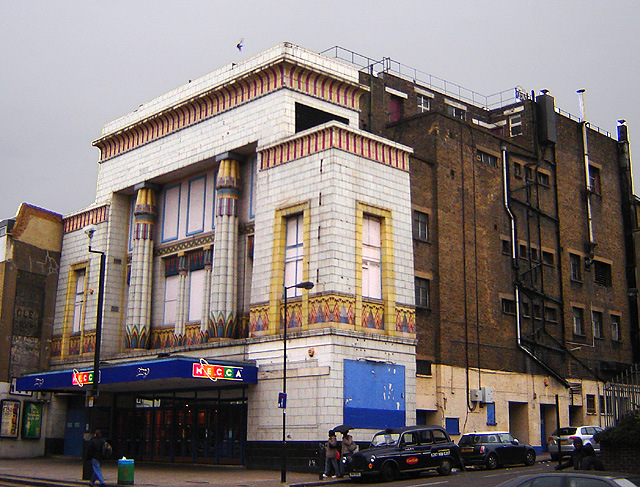
The building in 2005, when it was a Mecca Bingo hall
