= Action for Children =

United Kingdom children's charity

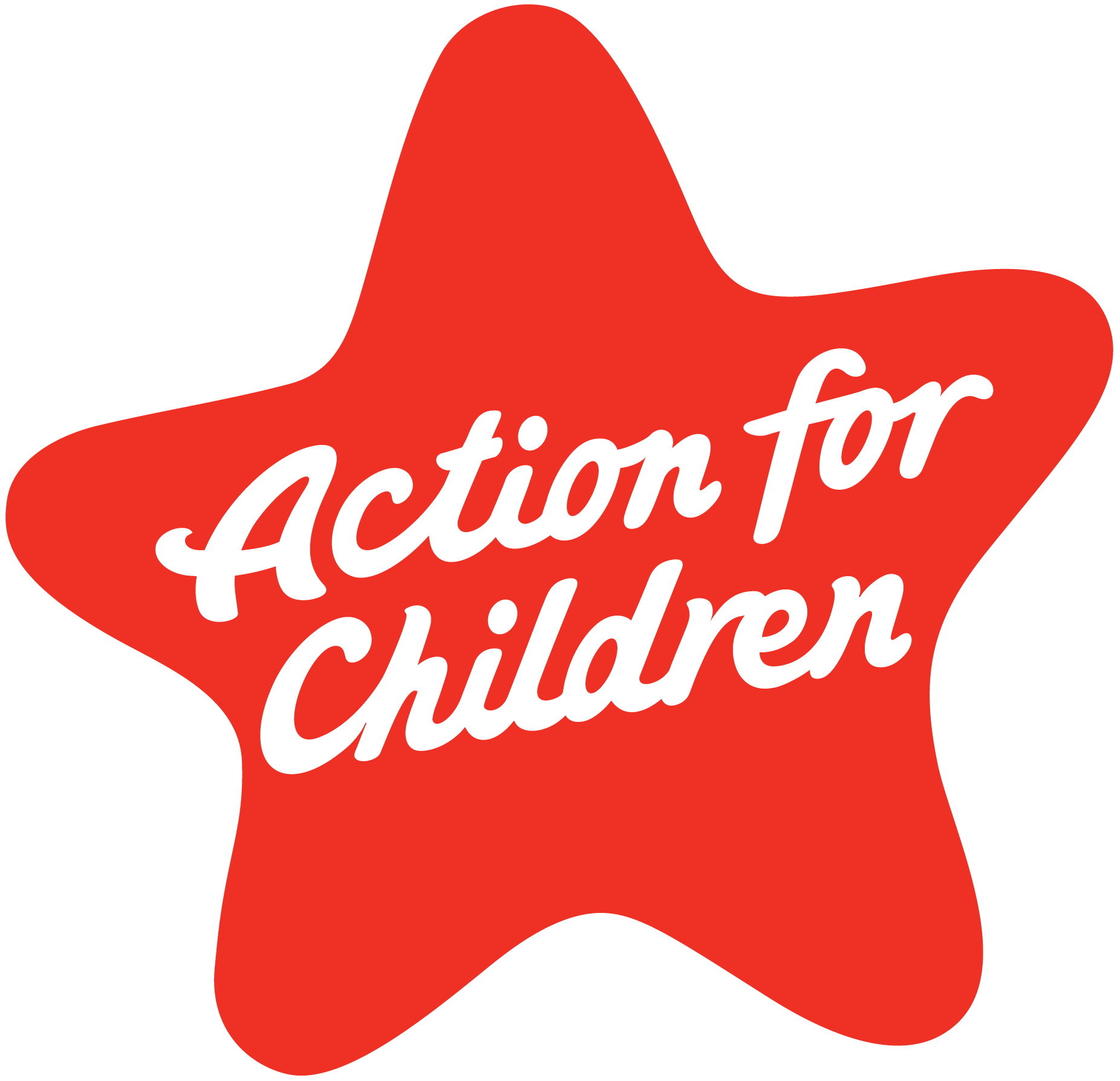
- Formation: 1869; 157 years ago
- Type: Nonprofit
- VAT ID no.: 589629566
- Registration no.: 1097940 (England & Wales), SC038092 (Scotland); 29 (Isle of Man); CH330 (Guernsey)
- Legal status: Charity
- Purpose: Children and young people's welfare
- Headquarters: 3 The Boulevard, Ascot Road, Watford WD18 8AG
- Location: United Kingdom
- Chief Executive: Paul Carberry
- Key people: Sarika Patel; Chair of the Board of Trustees
- Staff: 7,000
- Volunteers: 4,000
- Website: www.actionforchildren.org.uk
- Formerly called: NCH Action for Children; National Children's Home (NCH)

Action for Children (formerly National Children's Home) is a UK children's charity. Action for Children's national headquarters is in Watford, and it is a registered charity under English and Scottish law. In 2017/2018, it had a gross income of £151 million.

== History ==
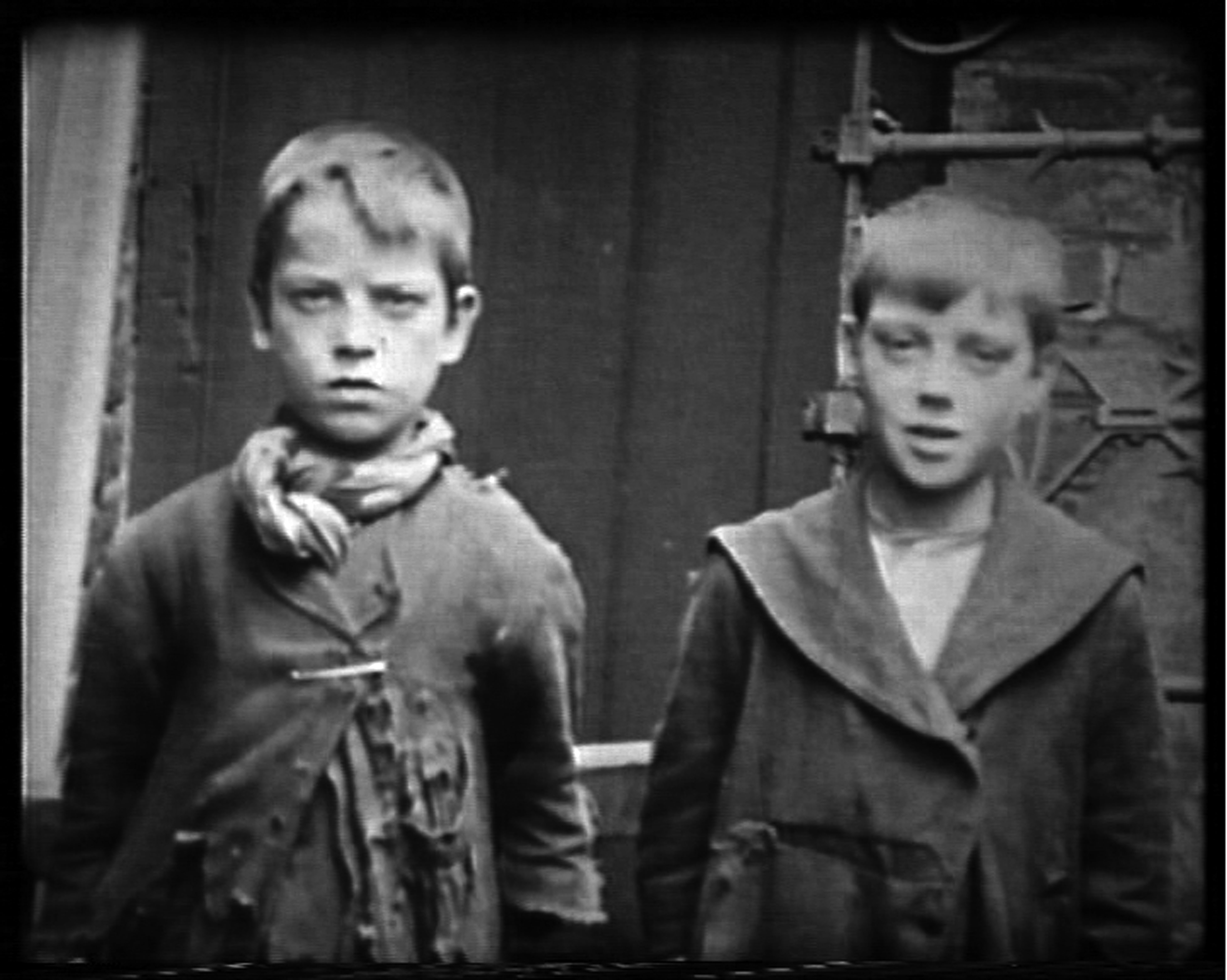
The first boys to be admitted to The Children's Home in 1869

The first 'Children's Home', a renovated stable in Church Street, Waterloo, was founded in 1869 by Methodist minister Thomas Bowman Stephenson, who had been moved by the plight of children living on the street in London. The first two boys were admitted on 9 July 1869. In 1871 the home was moved to Bonner Road, Victoria Park, and girls were admitted. The home was approved by the Wesleyan Methodist Conference in the same year. A year later, in 1872, a second home opened in Edgworth, Lancashire.

The homes were divided into small family units run by a 'house mother' and 'house father', which was in marked contrast to the large institutions and workhouses common at the time. Training was also an important aspect. A childcare course was set up in 1878, and the graduates of this programme—who were called 'the Sisterhood' or 'the Sisters of the Children'—went on to work in the home.

An industrial school at Milton, Gravesend, was taken over in 1875, and a children's refuge in Ramsey on the Isle of Man was established in 1882. With the opening of the Princess Alice Orphanage in Birmingham the home was renamed 'Children's Home and Orphanage'.

Further properties in Alverstoke, Hampshire; Chipping Norton, Oxfordshire; Frodsham, Cheshire; and Bramhope near Leeds were acquired, and, by 1908, the charity had grown to become the 'National Children's Home and Orphanage'.

In 1913, work began on a large site in Harpenden, which became home to over 200 children, with a print works for apprentices. It subsequently became the charity's head office.

Many other new branches and schools were founded, including the first residential nursery branch in Sutton Coldfield in 1929 and the first Scottish branch in Glasgow in 1955. The charity became an adoption agency in 1926.

The Rev. Gordon Barritt, who became the head of NCH in 1969, started the process of closing the organisation's children's homes and starting to offer support to keep children with their families.

In 1994, the charity changed its name to 'NCH Action for Children'. Fourteen years later, in September 2008, it became 'Action for Children'. The changes were part of the shift away from providing children's homes (most of which have now closed) to a wider range of services.

In December 2016, Catherine, Duchess of Cambridge, succeeded Elizabeth II as patron of the organisation.

== Child migration ==
The NCH set up a child emigration scheme in 1873, and a branch in Hamilton, Ontario, Canada, opened. This programme of sending children to Canada, where they were called Home Children, has been criticised, and children have been found to have been abused following migration. The NCH itself has said that "the experience of migration was profoundly damaging to significant numbers of the children concerned". NCH is estimated to have sent 3,500 children to Canada between 1873 and 1931 and a small number of children to Australia in the 1930s and early 1950s. The Independent Inquiry found that some children were sent by the NCH without their parents' consent, and that some children who wanted to come back to the UK were not allowed by the NCH to do so. The inquiry concluded that, although the NCH's principles of care had been ambitious for the time, some children were placed in "harsh conditions":

The NCH put more measures in place than other institutions to monitor the care being afforded to child migrants. This allowed them to appreciate the poor care being provided to some child migrants in Australia. They then took the commendable decision to halt migration promptly in light of the concerns raised.

Nevertheless, we consider that NCH’s failure during the migration period to ensure that it received more regular reports from the receiving institutions meant that it could not be properly satisfied about some aspects of the care provided. This included the quality and number of staff, and the punishment regimes in place.

The Inquiry also finds that, although the NCH stopped migrating children due to concerns about the adverse conditions, it did not bring back to the UK those children previously migrated.

In these respects, the NCH failed to take sufficient care to protect child migrants from the risk of sexual abuse.

The organisation continues to offer an information and record-access service to people who were sent overseas as children under its auspices.

== Projects and services ==
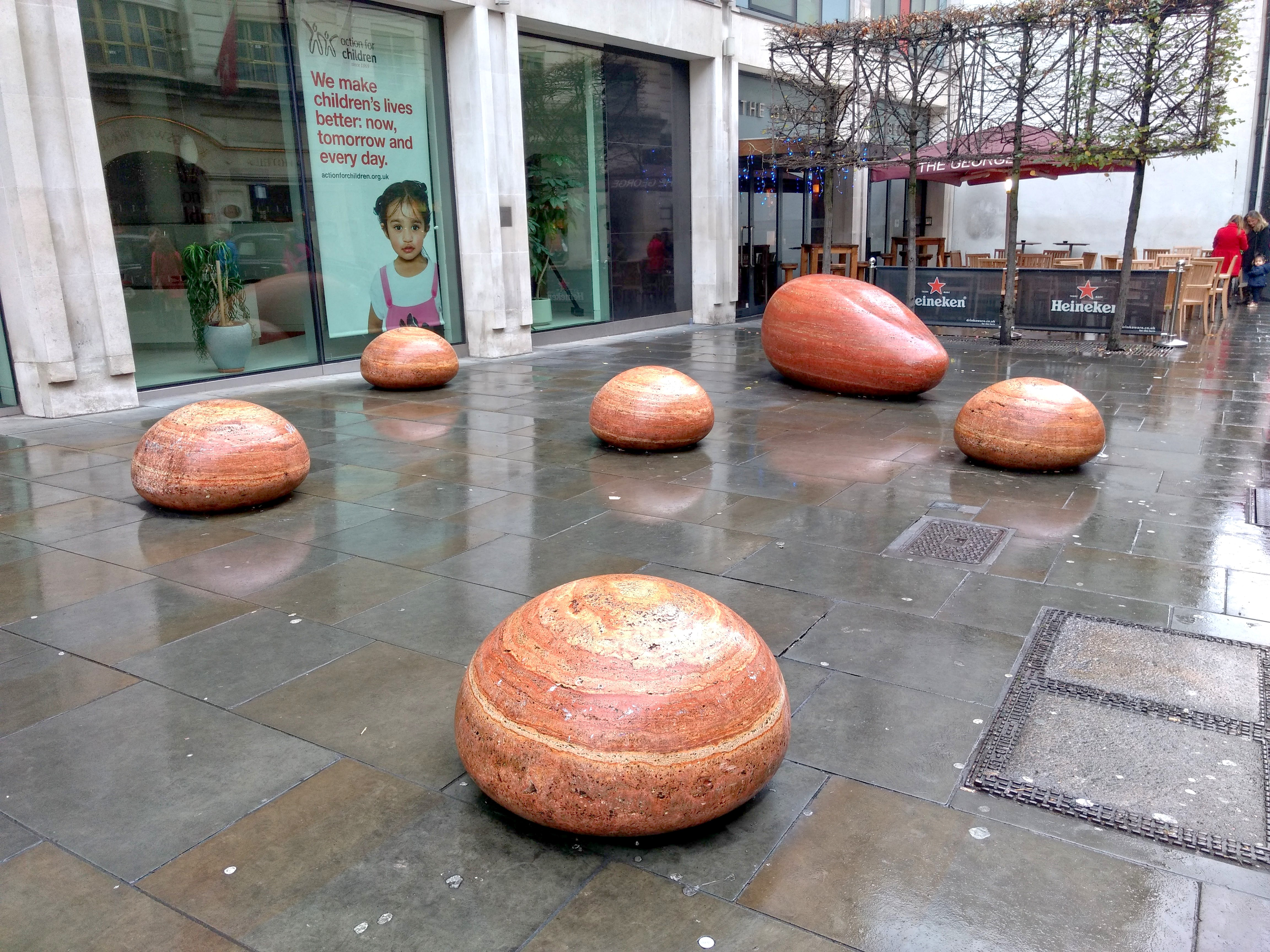
Family: from another place by David Worthington, 2010. Red Iranian Travertine stone, Great Queen Street, London.

Action for Children works in partnership with statutory bodies to deliver services for children, young people, and their families in five main areas:

=== Family support ===
Action for Children is a major provider of family support services and works in partnership with local authorities across the UK. The aim is to facilitate early intervention and then offer long-term help so families can stay together if possible. This is provided through children's and family centres, parenting programmes, and targeted intervention initiatives, often with the hardest-to-reach groups in the community.

=== Disability ===
Action for Children runs specialist projects for disabled children and those with learning and behavioural difficulties. These include residential care, short breaks and respite care services, keyworker support for families and carers, and advocacy work to help young disabled people transition into adulthood.

=== Children in care ===
Action for Children is a registered adoption agency and delivers fostering programmes. The charity also runs a number of small residential units for children and young people, as well as supporting young care leavers moving into independent living.

=== Support for young people ===
Action for Children works with vulnerable and disadvantaged young people. Issues these young people may face include alcohol and substance misuse, anti-social behaviour, homelessness, and unemployment. Other services offer support for young carers, teenage parents, victims of sexual abuse, and those leaving young offenders institutions. This support is provided through a range of services, which offer counselling, help with housing and benefits, access to training and education, basic skills tuition, mediation, and mentoring.

=== Education ===
Action for Children runs a number of schools for children and young people with disabilities, profound and multiple learning difficulties (PMLD) and challenging behaviour (including social or emotional problems). The charity's aim is to offer a secure environment in which to facilitate educational, social and personal development adapted to pupils' individual abilities. The schools offer both residential placements and day care.

== Research ==
Action for Children carries out and commissions research into issues around children, young people and families.

The charity also produces a yearly Impact Report, which details research findings on the outcomes and cost effectiveness of its work supporting children and young people.

== Campaigning ==
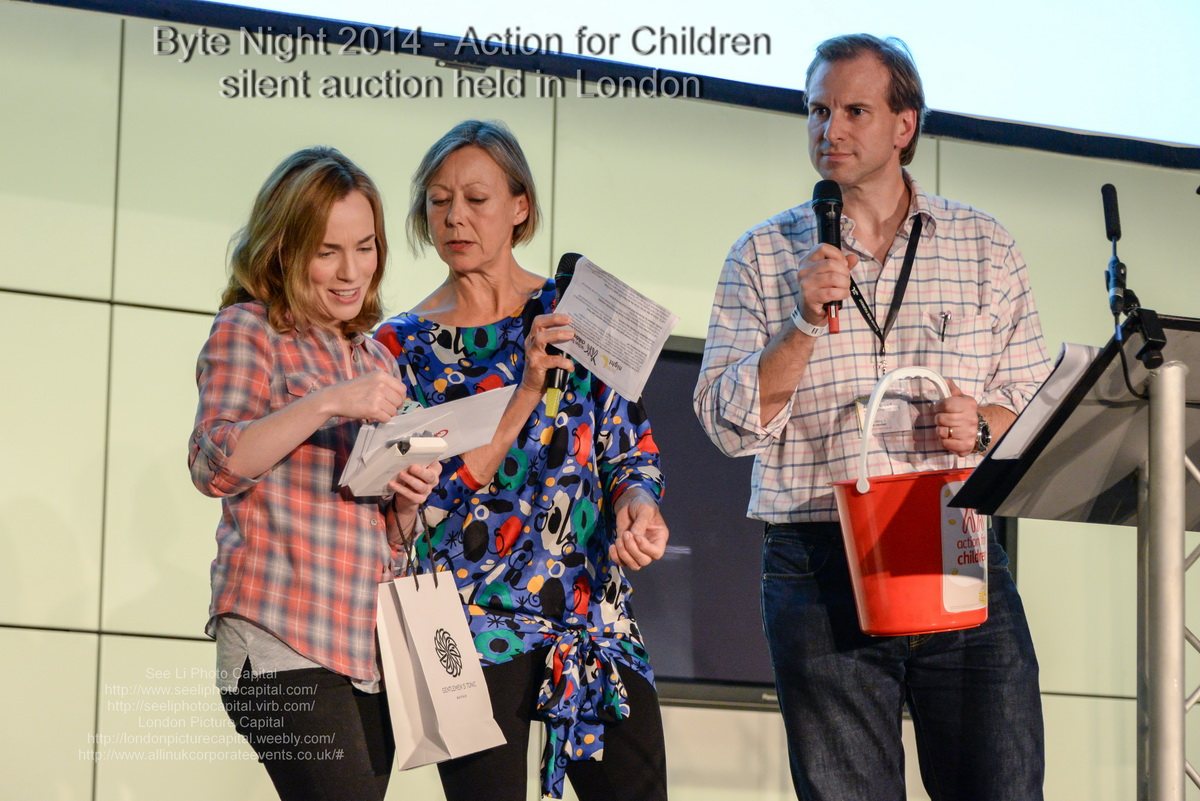
Action for Children hosted the 2014 Byte Night Overnight Challenge.

Action for Children campaigns and lobbies governments on behalf of vulnerable children and young people and their families.

One of the charity's current campaigns, 'Best Start in Life', seeks to address the issue of children – particularly those from poorer backgrounds – struggling to receive the right early years support. The campaign calls on the government to take urgent action so that children under five do not fall behind, either due to cuts in vital services or unequal access to opportunities.

Action for Children is a member of the Disabled Children's Partnership alongside 27 other charities, working towards better health and social care for disabled children, young people and their families.

The charity also leads the children and families work of the Jo Cox Commission on Loneliness and is a partner of End Child Poverty.

Action for Children is a founding member of Fostering Through Social Enterprise (FtSE), a consortium of voluntary and non-profit fostering agencies that advocate for children in respect of regulation, as well as representing its membership at central government level.

== Fundraising ==
Action for Children raises money through corporate partnerships, fundraising events (such as sponsored runs) and through its partnership with the British Methodist Church.

The charity is also involved with several large fundraising events, including Byte Night – an IT industry event which raises money to prevent youth homelessness – and Never Mind The Business, a music-based quiz night for business people.

In 2018, Action for Children launched its Secret Santa fundraising campaign. The campaign encouraged the public to become a Secret Santa for a vulnerable child, donating £10 or more to support children in the UK at Christmas.

Because of its links to the Methodist Church, which opposes gambling, before 2003 Action for Children did not accept National Lottery funding.

In 2000 and 2002, the organisation was criticised, including by its own staff, for accepting funding from BAE Systems, an arms manufacturer.

== See also ==
- Clare Tickell
- Walter Tull
