= Barnardo's =

British children's charity

- Founded: 1866; 160 years ago
- Founder: Thomas John Barnardo
- Type: Charity
- Registration no.: 216250 (England and Wales); SC037605 (Scotland); 20010027 (Ireland)
- Purpose: Children and Families.
- Headquarters: Barnardo's Tanners Lane Barkingside Ilford Essex IG6 1QG
- Location: United Kingdom, Ireland, New Zealand, Australia
- Region served: Wales, Scotland, England, Ireland, New Zealand, Australia
- Services: Young Carers, Adoption & Fostering, National Projects, Familial Support.
- Revenue: £245,183,000
- Employees: 5,026
- Volunteers: 17,175
- Website: barnardos.org.uk
- Formerly called: Dr. Barnardo's Homes, Dr. Barnardo's

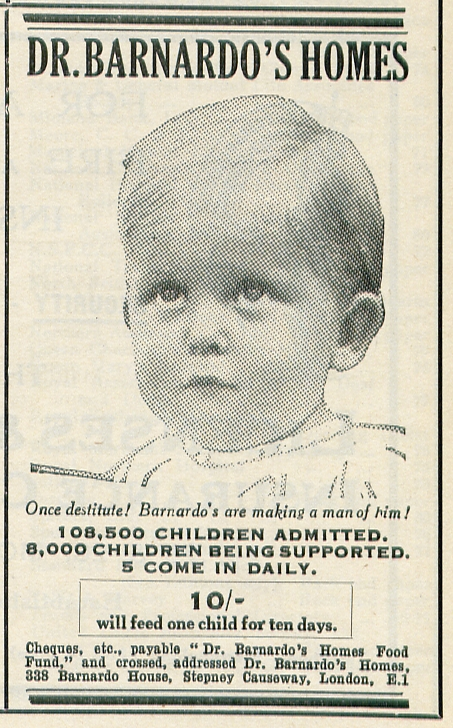
A 1931 advertisement

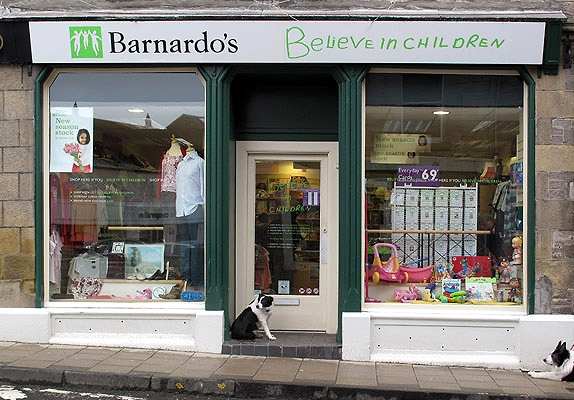
A Barnardo's charity shop in Jedburgh, Scotland. Barnardo's current tagline is "Believe in children".

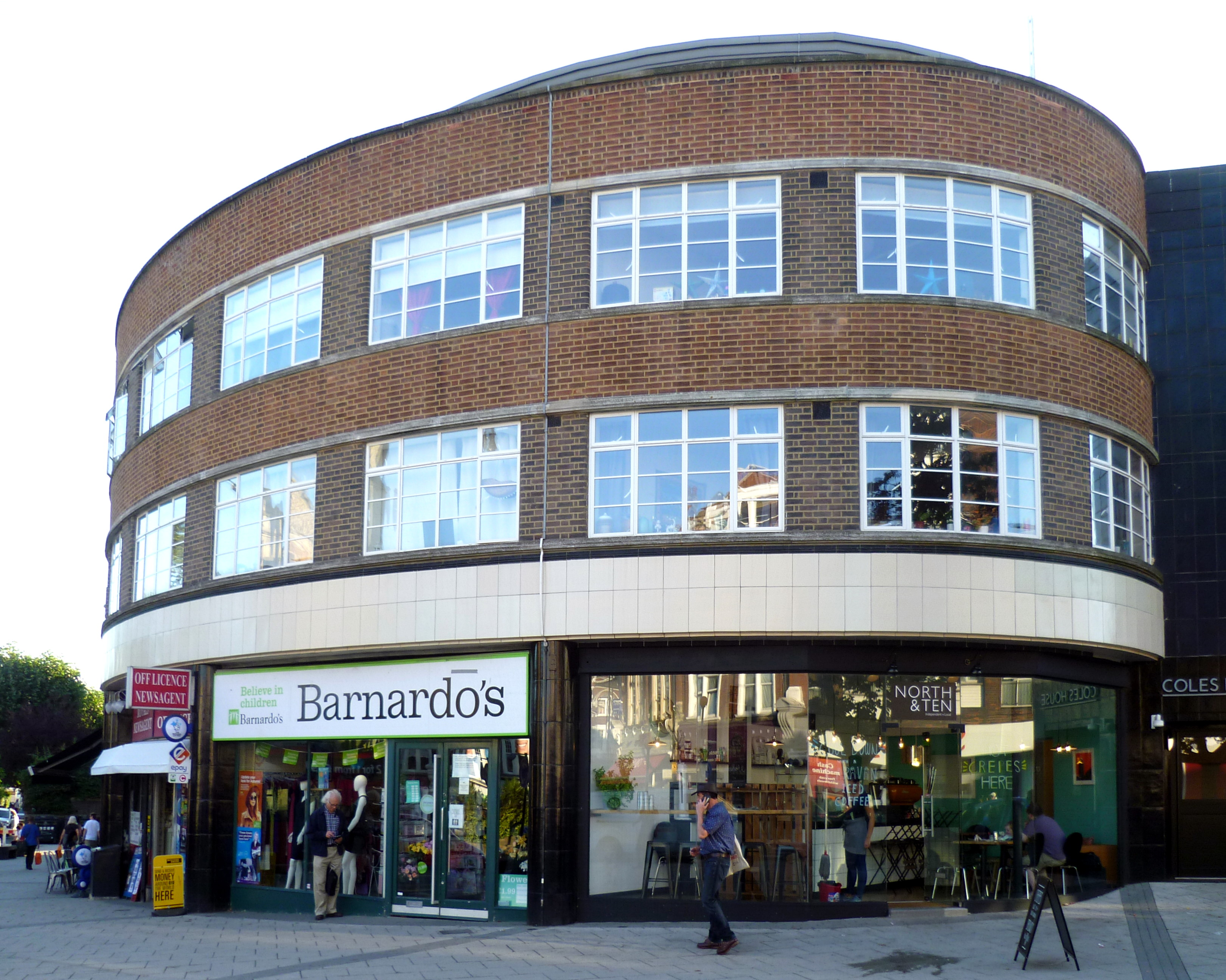
A Barnardo's shop in Muswell Hill, London.

Barnardo's is a global charity headquartered in Barkingside in the London Borough of Redbridge. It was founded by Thomas John Barnardo in 1866, to care for vulnerable children. As of 2013, it raised and spent around £200 million each year running around 900 local services, aimed at helping these same groups. It is the largest children's charity in the UK in terms of charitable expenditure.

== History ==
The National Incorporated Association for the Reclamation of Destitute Waif Children otherwise known as Dr. Barnardo's Homes was founded by Irish-born doctor Thomas Barnardo, who opened a school in the East End of London to care for and educate children of the area left orphaned and destitute by a recent cholera outbreak. In 1870, he founded a boys' orphanage at 18 Stepney Causeway and later opened a girls' home. By the time of his death in 1905, Barnardo's institutions cared for more than 8,500 children in 96 locations. His work was carried on by his many supporters under the name Dr. Barnardo's Homes National Incorporated Association. Following societal changes in the mid-20th century, the charity changed its focus from the direct care of children to fostering and adoption, renaming itself Dr. Barnardo's in 1965. Following the closure of its last traditional orphanage in 1988, it took the still simpler name of Barnardo's. The official mascot of Barnardo's is a bear called Barney. Its chief executive is Javed Khan.

There was controversy early on with Barnardo's work. Specifically, he was accused of kidnapping children without parents' permission and of falsifying photographs of children to make the distinction between the period before they were rescued by Barnardo's and afterwards seem more dramatic. He openly confessed to the former of these charges, describing it as "philanthropic abduction" and basing his defence on the idea that the ends justified the means. In all, he was taken to court on 88 occasions, largely on the charge of kidnapping. However, being a charismatic speaker and popular figure, he rode through these scandals unscathed. Other charges brought against him included neglecting basic hygiene for the children under his care.

Between 1945 and 1974, Barnardo's supported and participated in schemes that saw around 150,000 children exported to imperial colonies where they were mostly abused, beaten and neglected.

In October 2022, Buckingham Palace announced that more than 1,000 Paddington Bears and teddy bears left at royal sites after the death of Queen Elizabeth II would be donated to Barnardo's.

=== Experience of mixed-race children ===
A "special problem" of the upbringing and socialisation of mixed-race children was noted in Barnardo's Annual Report of 1951.

Suzi Hamilton was born out of wedlock and sent to Barnardo's by her married mother in 1946. Suzi's father was a black G.I. She had a tough time at home and the Barnardo's employees who were responsible for her care treated her notably differently from the white children under their care. This included being required to refer to carers formally while her white peers addressed them using familial language, being isolated from guests during public events, and more overtly racist language and treatment. She wrote about her experiences in her book Notice me! which also described several unsuccessful attempts to adopt her. She also talked about the short vacations that she had with her "aunts" and "uncles" where on one vacation she experienced her first menstrual period and was told to be extra careful as she was not a white girl.

Susan Tomkins, born in Taunton, Somerset to a married mother, was sent to Barnardo's around the age of eight alongside her two brothers. She stayed at Barnardo's for about a year. Her grandmother, who was protective of her in the face of any racism, took care of her once she went home.

== Communications ==
Barnardo's has used advertising campaigns to raise public awareness of its work. A 2003 advert that featured a new-born baby with a cockroach crawling out of its mouth was banned by the Advertising Standards Authority (ASA) after a storm of public protest. In 2008, its "Break the cycle" TV advert featuring a girl being repeatedly hit around the head by her father prompted a number of complaints but was cleared by the ASA, which said the imagery was justified, given the context.

In 2009 Martin Narey, then Chief Executive of Barnardo's, stated that he believed that more children should be taken into care. This statement caused considerable controversy, especially as historical references were made by journalists to Barnardo's original practice of "philanthropic abduction". By 2012, there was little opposition to Narey's claim, which was publicly supported by the NSPCC and Action For Children, who called for an overhaul of the law on neglect.

== Criticism ==
=== Cedars controversy ===
In 2011, Barnardo's was criticised for its work in Cedars, the name chosen by UK Immigration Enforcement for what it describes as "pre-departure accommodation" (detention facility) near Gatwick Airport used to hold families with children pending deportation. Barnardo's provides "welfare and social care facilities" at the detention centre, which is managed on behalf of UK Visas and Immigration by private security company G4S. Barnardo's has been criticised by Frances Webber of the Institute of Race Relations for "legitimising child detention".

Activists opposed to the detention of children, such as members of the No Border network, have mounted a campaign against the charity's involvement in Cedars. This included actions such as occupying Barnardo's London head office in February 2012, and disrupting the "Barnardo's Young Supporters" choir concert at the Royal Albert Hall in April 2012.

In response to criticism, Anne Marie Carrie, then Chief Executive of Barnardo's, stated that the decision to provide welfare and social care services at Cedars is in the children's best interests, outlining Barnardo's "red lines" and the action it will take if the welfare and dignity of any asylum seeking families and children is at risk.

=== Child physical and sexual abuse ===
The 2014–2015 Northern Ireland Historical Institutional Abuse Inquiry included Barnardo's Sharonmore Project, Newtownabbey and Barnardo's Macedon, Newtownabbey among the institutions under investigation. The charity was aware of child abuse but did not retain the records, as the evidence could have been used in court. Barnardo's was also implicated in this inquiry for sending British children to Australia in the mid-20th century, where some were tortured, raped and enslaved. Barnardo's acknowledges its role in this "well-intentioned" but "deeply misguided" policy supported by the government of the time.

Barnardo's was further scrutinised in 2018, as investigations and inquiries into failures in NGO safeguarding expanded.

In 2020, the Scottish Child Abuse Inquiry issued a report which included Barnardo's homes at Tyneholm, Balcary, Glasclune and Craigerne in Scotland. The Inquiry concluded that children in the care of these homes in the 1950s and 1960s suffered emotional, sexual and physical abuse.

==== Apology ====
Martin Crewe, the head of Barnardo's Scotland, said in 2020: "We absolutely apologise for what happened to those individuals. Any instance of abuse is absolutely unacceptable."

On 11 March 2022 ministers from the five main political parties in Northern Ireland and six abusing institutions made statements of apology in the Northern Ireland Assembly. The six institutions that apologised for carrying out abuse were De La Salle Brothers, represented by Br Francis Manning; the Sisters of Nazareth, represented by Sr Cornelia Walsh; the Sisters of St. Louis, represented by Sr Uainin Clarke; the Good Shepherd Sisters, represented by Sr Cait O'Leary; Barnardo's in Northern Ireland, represented by Michele Janes; and Irish Church Missions, represented by Rev. Mark Jones.

In live reporting after the apology, BBC News reported that Jon McCourt from Survivors North West said: "If what happened today was the best that the church could offer by way of an apology they failed miserably. There was no emotion, there was no ownership. ... I don't believe that the church and institutions atoned today." He called on the institutions to "do the right thing" and contribute to the redress fund for survivors, saying that institutions have done similar for people in Scotland. McCourt praised the government ministers' apologies; they had "sat and thought out and listened to what it was we said", but said that the institutions had failed to do this, leading to some victims having to leave the room while they were speaking, "compound[ing] the hurt".

Others angry at the institutions' apologies included Caroline Farry, who attended St Joseph's Training School in Middletown from 1978 to 1981, overseen by nuns from the Sisters of St Louis, Pádraigín Drinan from Survivors of Abuse, and Alice Harper, whose brother, a victim of the De La Salle Brothers, had since died. Peter Murdock, from campaign group Savia, was at Nazareth Lodge Orphanage with his brother (who had recently died); he likened the institution to an "SS camp". He said "It's shocking to hear a nun from the institution apologising ... it comes 30 years too late ... people need to realise that it has to come from the heart. They say it came from the heart but why did they not apologise 30 years ago?"

== Music ==
During the 1950s, children from the homes made recordings, including appearing on Petula Clark's 1952 recording of "Where Did My Snowman Go?". They also made recordings as a vocal group for Polygon and Pye Nixa Records.

== Barnardo's Barkingside regeneration programme ==
Barnardo's employs approximately 450 staff in Barkingside in Ilford, eastern Greater London, including secondments and visitors. Since September 2013, operations were consolidated in one, smaller, building on the Barkingside site. The new building was financed by housing developments undertaken after public consultation and discussions with local residents in Barkingside.

== Affiliations ==
Barnardo's is a founding member of Fostering Through Social Enterprise (FtSE), a consortium of voluntary and non-profit fostering agencies that advocate for children in respect of regulation, as well as representing its membership at central government level.

In January 2016, it was announced that Barnardo's would be one of the chosen charities for Santander's The Discovery Project alongside Age UK. As well as giving financial donations to the charities on Track project, Santander will also allow staff to volunteer in their charity shops.

== In the Commonwealth ==
Spinoff charities Barnardos Australia and Barnardos New Zealand (now spelt without an apostrophe following local practice) were set up in the 20th century with the same mission. Barnardos Australia uses a similar slogan to the UK organisation, "We believe in children", while Barnardos New Zealand uses the slogan "Do more for Kiwi kids."

== See also ==
- Barnardo's Big Toddle
