= George Coles (architect) =

English architect (1884–1963)

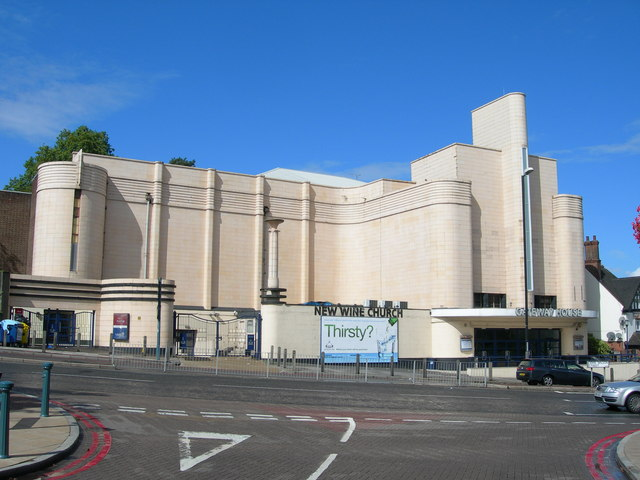
The New Wine Church in Woolwich was one of Cole’s’ Streamline Moderne designs for Odeon Cinemas. Opened as a cinema in 1937 it is now a church.

George Coles (1884–1963) was an English architect, known mostly as a designer of Art Deco cinema theatres in the 1920s and 1930s.

Coles was brought up in Leyton, East London and trained at Leyton Technical Institute. From 1912 he was in partnership with Percy Adams. Coles' most notable works include the Grade II listed Troxy in Stepney, and the Gaumont State Cinema in Kilburn and the Odeon, Muswell Hill, both of which are Grade II* listed buildings. Historic England describe his 1937 Woolwich cinema as, "the best example of the 'Odeon' style".

Coles designed several other Odeon Cinemas for Oscar Deutsch, including Odeon Isleworth in Isleworth, as well as the Carlton Cinema in Islington, and the Regal Cinema in Kettering. He designed the Kingsland Empire in his birthplace, Dalston, of which the ceiling and upper walls survive hidden above the Rio Cinema. Coles was also involved in the design of the People's Palace (1936), later subsumed into Queen Mary College, University of London. He designed the British Home Stores (now Primark) in Rye Lane, Peckham.
