= Barnardo's Big Toddle =

The Barnardo's Big Toddle is the UK's biggest charity event for children under the age of 5.

== History ==
The event was established in 1997.

In 2007, Barnardo's Big Toddle employed the advertising agency Burnett Works to help reach £2 million in funds raised. 488,317 children registered in 2008 and raised a total of £1,315. In 2009 celebrity parents such as Jools Oliver, Lorraine Ashbourne, Andrew Lincoln, Helen McCrory, Damian Lewis and Fay Ripley took part in the events over the summer.

In 2010, for the first time ever, the Toddle had the theme of pirates. The 2010 Big Toddle launch took place on 25 May at London's V&A Museum of Childhood. X Factor star Stacey Solomon and actress Laila Rouass along with her daughter Inez were among hundreds of mums and toddlers who attended the launch. For 2011, the Toddle theme was animals. Toddlers can dress up as their favourite creature for the day in animal themed activities. In 2015, Barnardo's Big Toddle raised £700,000.

In 2017, Barnardo's Big Toddle formed a partnership with the pre-school children's television series Teletubbies to celebrate its 20th anniversary.

== Description ==
Each year up to half a million children take part in a short sponsored walk, with the proceeds going to help the UK's most disadvantaged under-5s. Anyone can join in: from nurseries, kindergartens and playgroups, to parents, friends and family. Barnardo's organised events take place every summer, from May to July. In 2011 there were fifty organised Toddles throughout the country. Some of the locations included Dulwich Park, Dudley Zoo, Glasgow Green, Singleton Park and Battersea Park Children's Zoo where the 2011 Toddle launch was held.

All the money raised from The Big Toddle goes towards Barnardo's early years projects. These are based throughout the UK, supporting young children and their families. These include family centres, play groups and counseling services. From 1997 to 2017, Barnardo's Big Toddle raised a total of £14.5 million for the benefit of 248,000 children, young people and families.

== See also ==
- Barnardo's
