= Cedars (immigration detention) =

Immigration detention facility in Crawley, West Sussex, United Kingdom

Coordinates: 51.0780°N 0.2016°W

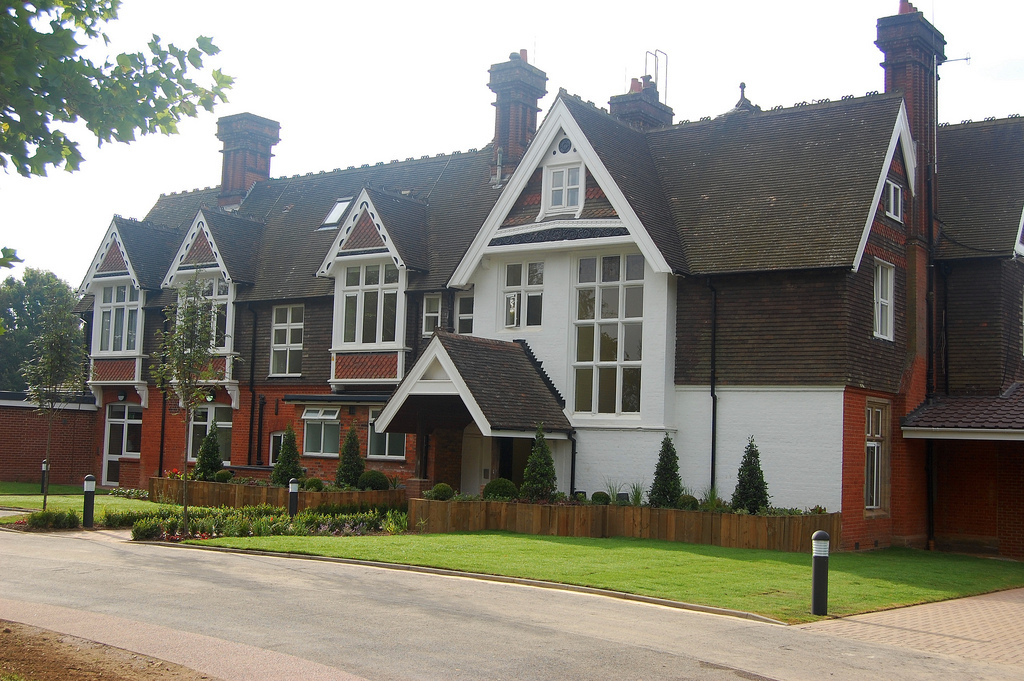
Exterior of the Cedars Pre-Departure Accommodation Facility

Cedars was an immigration detention facility in Crawley, West Sussex, United Kingdom adjacent to Gatwick Airport. It was operated by UK Visas and Immigration with security and facilities maintenance contracted out to G4S and Barnardo's providing social workers and child welfare services.

Opened in 2011, Cedars was the first immigration detention center in the UK specifically designated for families with children. Unlike other facilities for single adults, which are essentially medium security prisons holding immigration violators pending deportation, Cedars consisted of apartments in a more open atmosphere. As a result, the UK Border Agency has referred to the facility as pre-departure accommodation rather than immigration detention.

The closing of the costly, under-used facility was announced in August 2016. It was closed permanently in December 2016.

== Facility ==
Cedars was built around 9 individual apartments that can accommodate families of up to 6 persons. Each apartment had between 1 and 3 bedrooms, a living room, full kitchen and en-suite bathroom. Families were free to move about the interior of the facility at all times and the facility's grounds during daylight hours. They could also leave the facility with a staff escort for supervised activities.

- a fitness center including a basketball court, and equipment for football and other outdoor sports
- play areas for children
- several lounges
- a cafe and dining area - residents may either eat in the cafe or request ingredients to take back to their apartment and cook
- a library including immigration law materials
- a multi-faith prayer room and Mosque
- computing and internet facilities

Residents also had access to organized recreational activities, healthcare, counselling, therapy, and ministerial services if needed or desired.

== Controversy ==
- The use of G4S who has provided deportee escort services in the past for the UK Border Agency is not without controversy for the connection of three former employees to the death of Jimmy Mubenga in 2010.

== See also ==
- Immigration detention
