= New Wine Church =

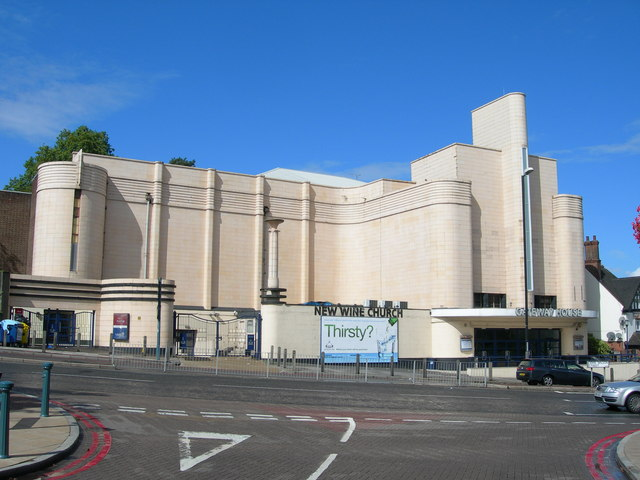

- 51.4932°N 0.0584°E
- Location: Gateway House, John Wilson Street, Woolwich, London
- Country: England
- Denomination: Pentecostal
- Website: newwine.co.uk

History
- Founded: 25 July 1993
- Founder: Tayo Adeyemi

New Wine Church (also known as Gateway House) is a non-denominational Christian megachurch in Southeast London. The church originally met in a leased facility. They then purchased and renovated one of four cinemas in Woolwich. The 3,000-member church occupies the former Coronet cinema complex and overlooks the Woolwich Ferry.

== History of the building ==
The cinema was opened as the Odeon Theatre on 25 October 1937 with Ralph Reader in The Gang Show. It was designed for the Oscar Deutsch chain of Odeon Cinemas by architect George Coles who came up with a streamlined Art Deco style.

Inside the auditorium, there were troughs of concealed lighting and a moulded plaster decoration on the splay walls in the form of a floral frieze which had backlighting. Seating was provided for 1,178 in the stalls and 650 in the balcony. It was modernised internally in May 1964, a process known as the Rank Organisation's "zing" treatment. It continued as the Odeon until closing on 17 October 1981. Independent film exhibitors Panton Films took over the building from 14 July 1983 and it reopened as the Coronet Cinema with Return of the Jedi. It was converted into a twin cinema from 6 July 1990 with seating for 678 in the former balcony and 360 seats in the former rear stalls. The Coronet was closed on 6 June 1999.

It was taken over by the New Wine Church from 2001 and the building is now known as 'Gateway House' which continues in church use today. The New Wine Church has made a number of alterations and renovations to the building. The building is a Grade II Listed Building and is currently used for (and is available for) weddings, music concerts, conferences, exercise classes and business meetings.

== Global ministry ==
The church, with the assistance of its affiliate, New Wine Covenant Partners, has taken part in missionary activities in Australia, the Netherlands, India, Ivory Coast, Kenya, Malaysia, Nigeria, Norway, South Africa, Tanzania and the United States. Internationally, New Wine has built a housing estate of 55 homes for over 100 lepers in Chennai India. The estate also benefits from a full-time nurse, electricity, clean water, food and a chaplaincy. The Church also funds a water project in Zambia, providing boreholes for 10 villages. They run an Operation Christmas child campaign which provides shoeboxes filled with gifts for Eastern European children.

== Previous senior pastors and borough deans ==
Tayo Adeyemi (1993–2013) and Michael Olawore (2013–2018) were previous senior pastors of the church. One of the seven Ecumenical Borough Deans in Greenwich was Olu Ajanaku, formerly a minister at New Wine Church; he represented the black majority churches. EBDs are representatives of Christian churches to local government in London. David Chick took over this role in January 2015, representing black-led churches.
