= David Worthington =

British sculptor

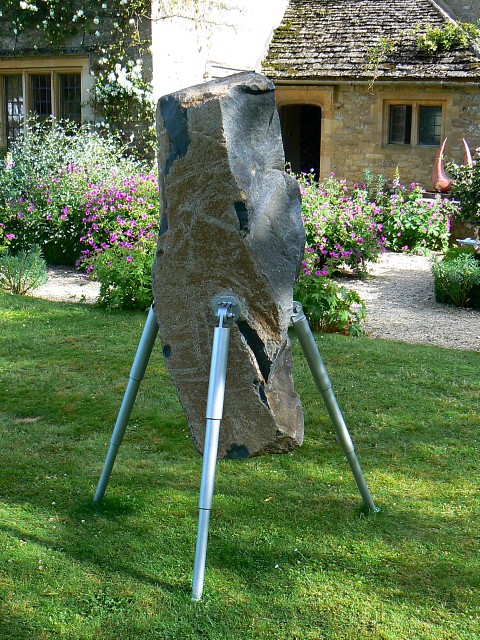
Great Tripod, on display at On Form 08, Asthall Manor, Oxfordshire, 2004.

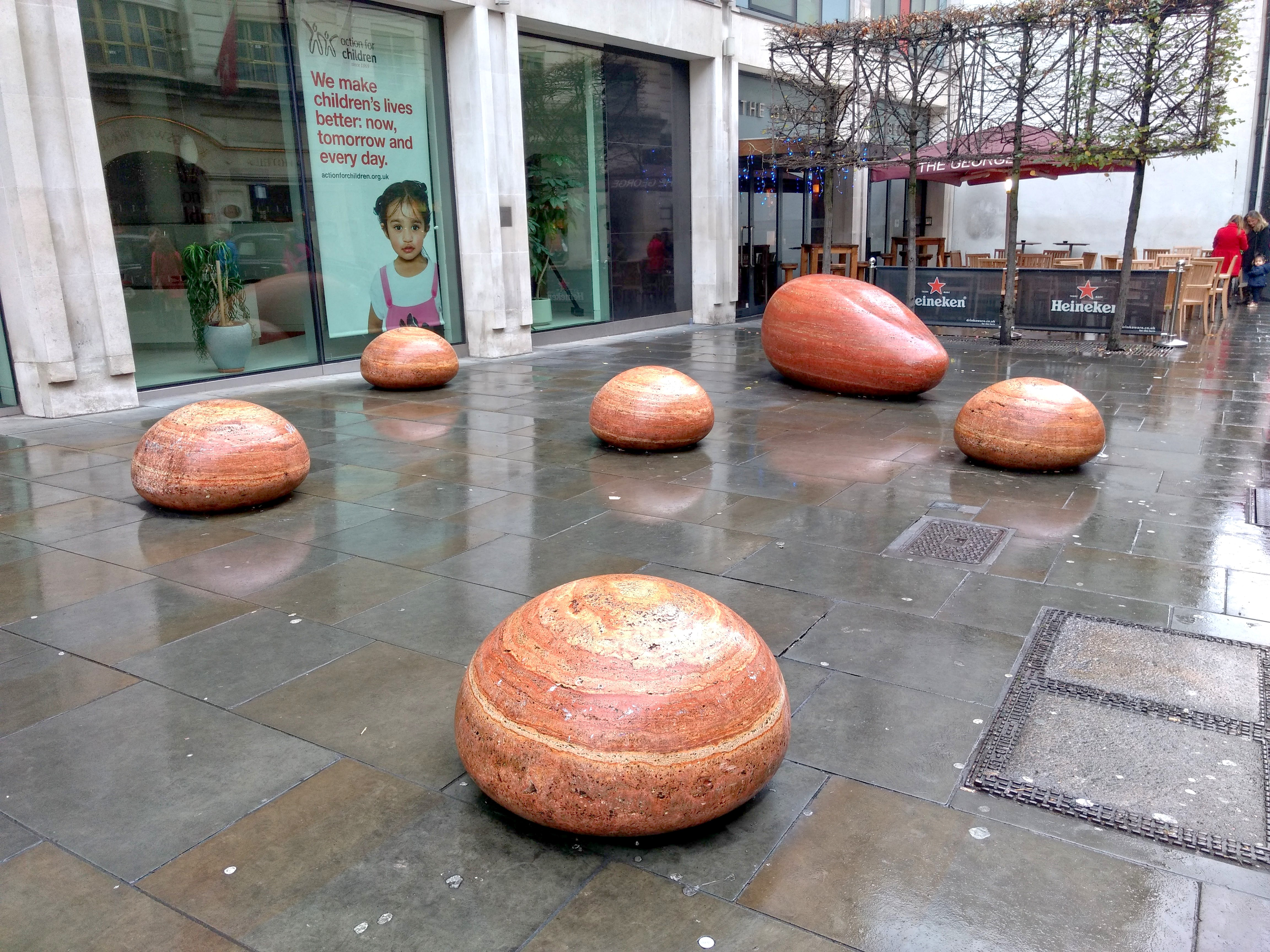
Family: from another place, 2010. Red Iranian Travertine stone, Great Queen Street, London.

David Worthington (born 1962) is a British sculptor in stone and fellow of the Royal British Society of Sculptors. He specialises in kinetic sculptures that members of the public can physically interact with.

== Early life and education ==
Worthington was born in 1962. He received is advanced education at the Art Students League in New York, and at Oxford University from where he graduated in 1984 with a degree in philosophy and theology. In 2001 Worthington received an MA in visual culture and in 2007 finished an MA in computer arts at Thames Valley University.

== Career ==
Worthington works mainly in stone, and specialises in kinetic sculptures that members of the public can physically interact with. He is a Fellow of the Royal Society of Sculptors. He has curated shows at Woburn Abbey, Glyndebourne, and the Chelsea Physic Garden. In 2010, he produced Family: from another place, in Red Iranian Travertine stone, for a commission from Henderson Global Investors. The work is displayed outside the premises of Action for Children in Great Queen Street, London. From November 2014 to January 2015 his works titled Experiments in Colour were exhibited at the William Benington Gallery in London.

== Personal life ==
Worthington is married to Jane Fox and they work in Bridport in Dorset where they opened the Fox & Worthington Fine Art gallery in 2013.
