= 107–123 Muswell Hill Road =

Building in Haringey, London, England

Coordinates: 51.5894°N 0.1458°W

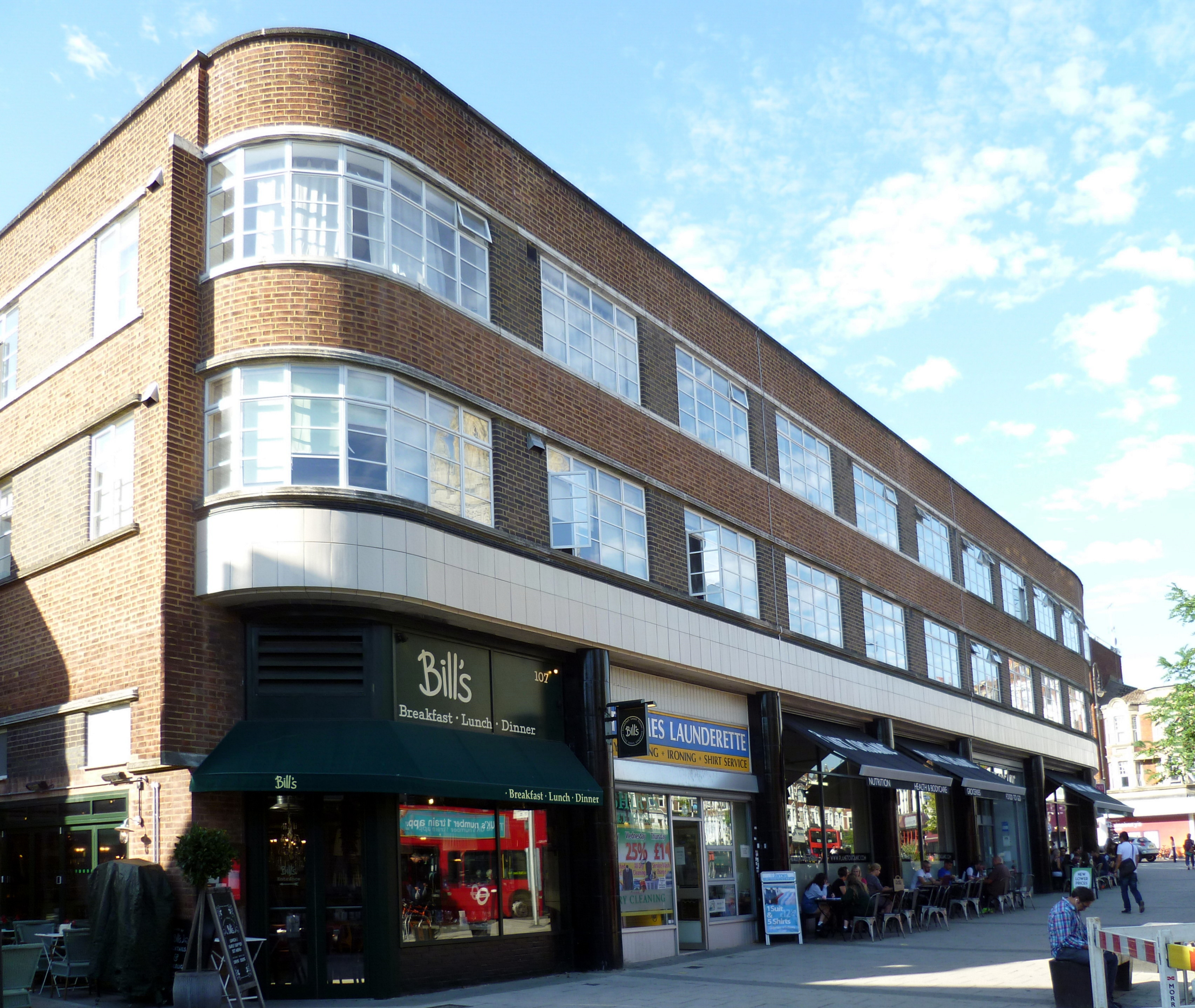
107–123 Muswell Hill Road, south end.

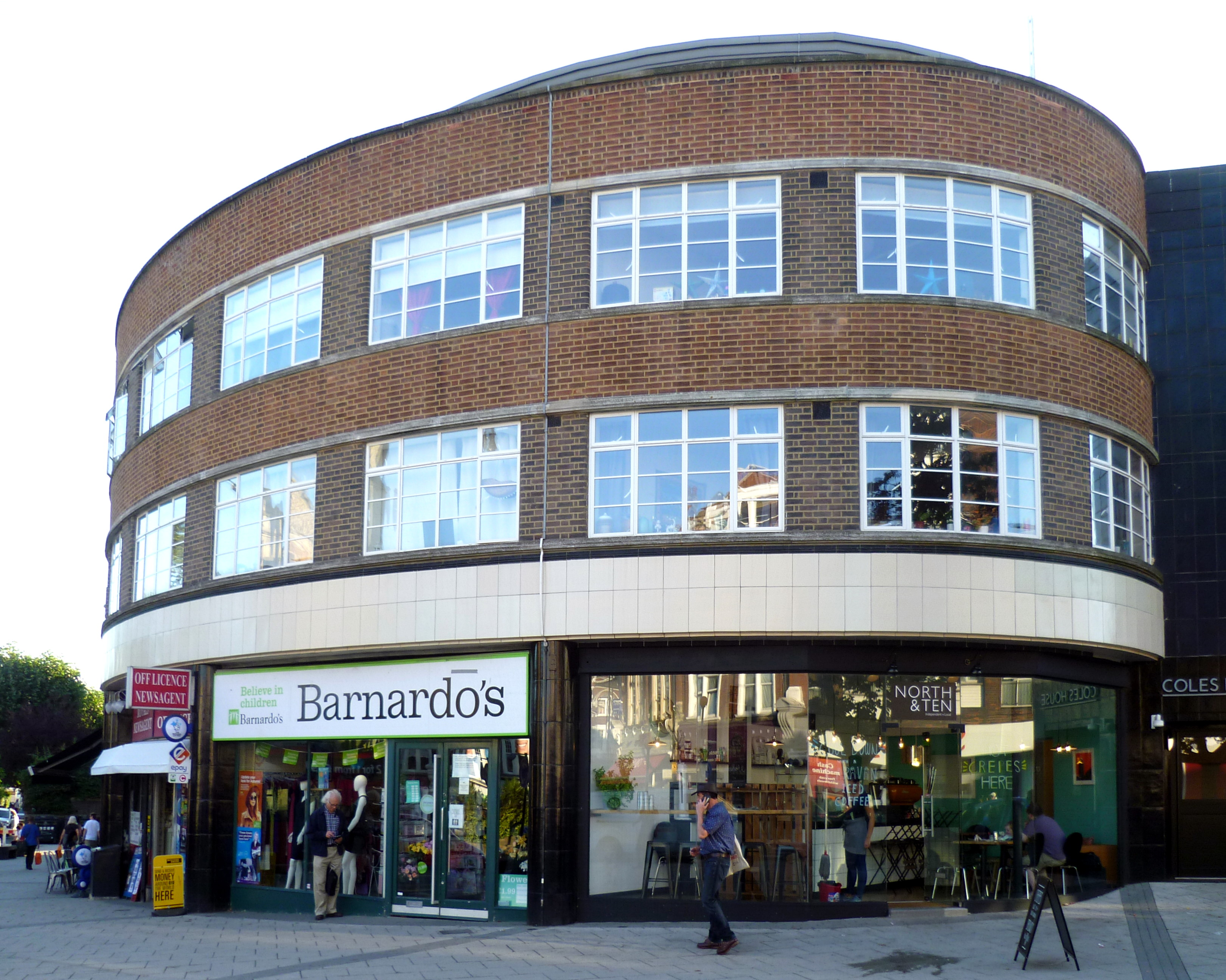
North end.

107–123 Muswell Hill Road is a grade II listed parade of shops in Muswell Hill Road, Muswell Hill, London.

The building adjoins the grade II* listed Everyman Cinema, formerly the Odeon Cinema, at its north end.
