= Troxy =

Entertainment venue in Stepney, London

Coordinates: 51.5128°N 0.04405°W

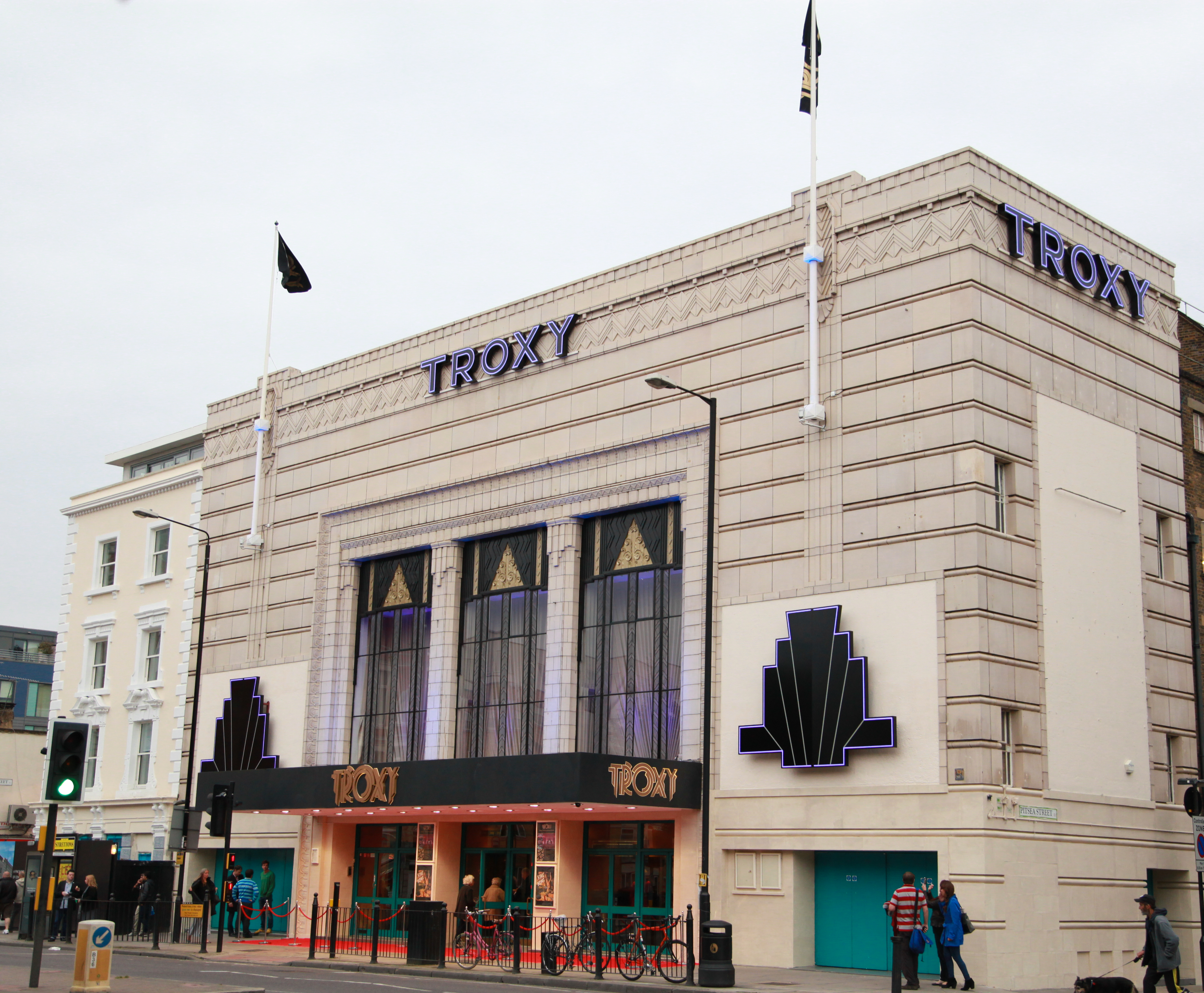
- Interactive map of Troxy
- Former names: Troxy Cinema, London Opera Centre, Top Rank Bingo, Mecca Bingo
- Address: 490 Commercial Road; London E1 0HX; England
- Location: Stepney
- Owner: Troxy London Limited
- Operator: Broadwick Group
- Seating type: Fixed tiered seating and booths in the circle
- Capacity: 3,100
- Type: Early 20th century art deco cinema

Construction
- Built: 1932
- Opened: 11 September 1933
- Renovated: 2012-2013
- Cost: £250 thousand (£71.3 million in 2025 pounds)
- Architect: George Coles

Website
- Venue Website

Troxy is a Grade II-listed Art Deco music venue on Commercial Road in Stepney, London. Built as a cinema in 1933, it closed in 1960 and became a training school for the London Opera Centre. In the 1980s the building was used as a bingo hall, and the Troxy was converted to a live events space in 2006. The building is considered a vital part of East London's history and was Grade II listed in 1990. It has a capacity of 3,100 that is to be extended in 2026 to 3,600

== History ==
Opened in 1933 on the site of an old brewery, Troxy cost £250,000 to build and when it first showed films had a capacity of 3,520, making it the largest cinema in England at that time. Inside the building the cinema had luxurious seating, a revolving stage, mirror-lined restaurants and customers were served by staff wearing evening dress. To add to the sense of luxury, Troxy staff sprayed perfume during film showings. The cinema showed all the latest major releases and had a floodlit organ which rose from the orchestra pit during the interval, playing popular tunes.

Troxy was designed by George Coles, the architect of many art deco cinemas in London. The first film shown at the cinema was King Kong, which is now celebrated by graffiti on the side of the building. Big names from the film and music industry were regular sights at Troxy, with stars such as The Andrews Sisters, Gracie Fields, Petula Clark, Cliff Richard and Clark Gable visiting it.

The damage inflicted on the East End of London by the Blitz in World War II and the clearance of local slums robbed Troxy of much of its original audience as the giant cinema closed in 1960, with the last film shown on 19 November that year, featuring Donald Sinden in The Siege of Sidney Street.

Between 1960 and 1963 Troxy stood empty until the Royal Opera House, Covent Garden, took over and created the London Opera Centre school for the training of opera singers and professionals, which was based there from 1963 to 1977. Its purpose was a rehearsal space, using an extended stage to create exactly the same dimensions as the Royal Opera House stage. The team made changes to the internal and basement areas of Troxy, creating multiple rooms for the orchestras to use as well as the stage. The Royal Opera House continued to use Troxy until 1990. The following year the building earned Grade II Listed status with English Heritage.

In the 1980s Mecca Bingo took over the venue and bingo sessions were held twice a day, seven days a week until 2005 when the rise of online gambling led to Mecca taking the decision to stop using the building.

== Troxy today ==
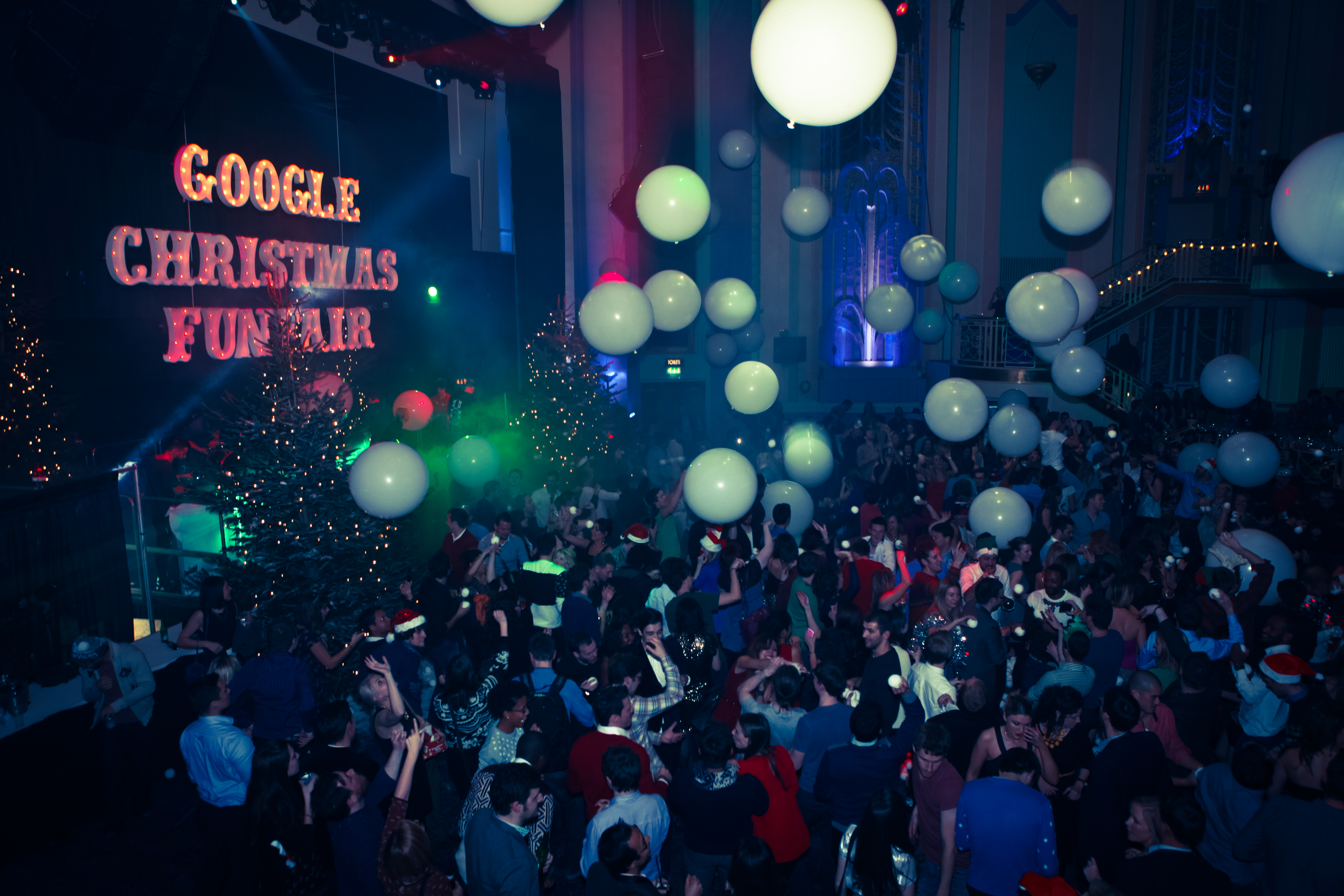
The Google Christmas Funfair held at Troxy in 2013

The venue was reborn as a live events space in 2006, and has continued to be used for concerts and other events ever since, hosting prestigious awards ceremonies, gigs, film screenings including Secret Cinema screenings and sporting events. In 2013 it hosted the NME Awards, with the magazine's editor Mike Williams describing the Troxy as one of London's "oldest, coolest and most iconic venues". The same year Google chose Troxy as the venue for its annual Christmas party for 1,500 guests.

Troxy now hosts live concerts and gigs including some of the biggest bands to play in the capital. In June 2016 Troxy hosted the annual Kerrang! Awards for the fourth consecutive year and is also regularly used for MMA fight nights. Since it reopened, Troxy has held concerts by bands such as the Jesus and Mary Chain, Flying Lotus, Jarvis Cocker, Beady Eye, Garbage, Morrissey, Doves, Pixies, City and Colour, Stereophonics, Patti Smith, Siouxsie, and The Cure.

Great care was being taken to bring Troxy into the 21st century while preserving its history. The current owners have invested heavily in restoring the venue as much as possible to its original glory while making it suitable for modern audiences. Troxy was the first venue in EMEA to permanently install the JBL VTX A12 loudspeaker system.

In 2009, Troxy screened its first film for more than 50 years, showing Secret Cinema's Bugsy Malone, complete with live music and custard pie fights. The venue marked its 80th birthday in 2013 by showing King Kong, the first film it had shown in 1933.

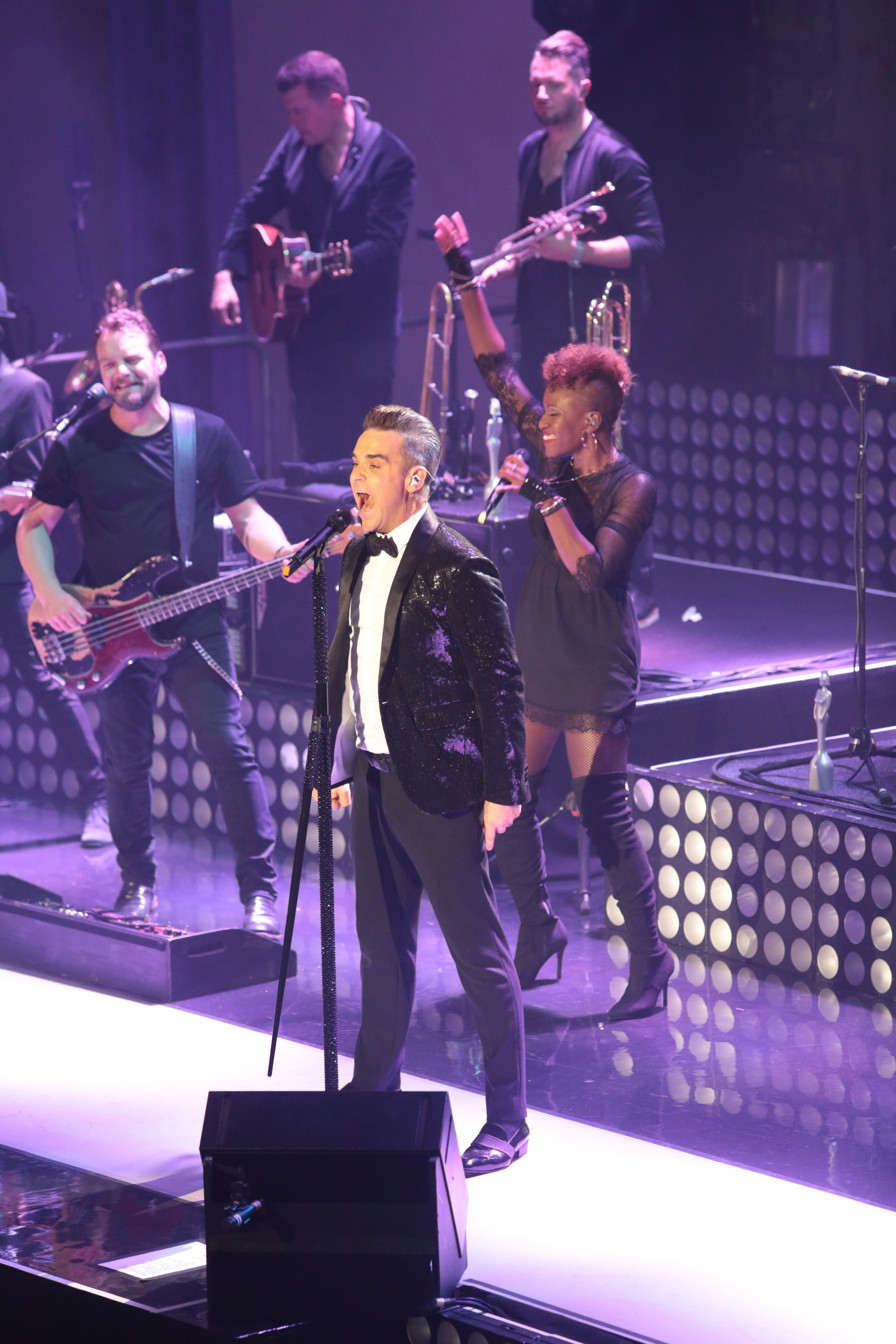
Robbie Williams at Troxy, 2016

The venue has also hosted a number of prestigious award ceremonies and televised events with Plan B and Kylie Minogue both awarding accolades to their managers at the venue. Danny Boyle presented about the London 2012 Olympics Opening Ceremony with The Times at Troxy and Channel 4 hosted its Brexit debate at the venue attended by a host of celebrities including Will Self, Sandie Shaw and Sheila Hancock.

In November 2016, Troxy hosted a Brits Icon concert fronted by Robbie Williams. A new truss had to be installed above the circle to house the incoming production. This involved working with a structural engineer to test the weight load of the ceiling to make sure it could be done safely. As well as a TV audience of 2.35 million, the BRITS Icon event raised Troxy's profile in the UK music media. In 2017, Troxy was used as the filming location for Sky One's talent contest, Sing: Ultimate A Capella.

DICE has been running its ticketing operations since 30 August 2018.

In November 2024, The Cure performed the only full live concert of the year at Troxy, London, celebrating the release of their fourteenth studio album Songs of a Lost World, which was first issued on 1 November 2024. The band played the album in full as part of a three-hour set that also included additional songs from their catalogue, and the show was streamed live on YouTube. The performance was later released as the live album Songs of a Live World: Troxy London MMXXIV, issued on 13 December 2024, with proceeds donated to War Child.

Broadwick Group has been running operations at Troxy since 1st July 2025.

== The Troxy organ ==
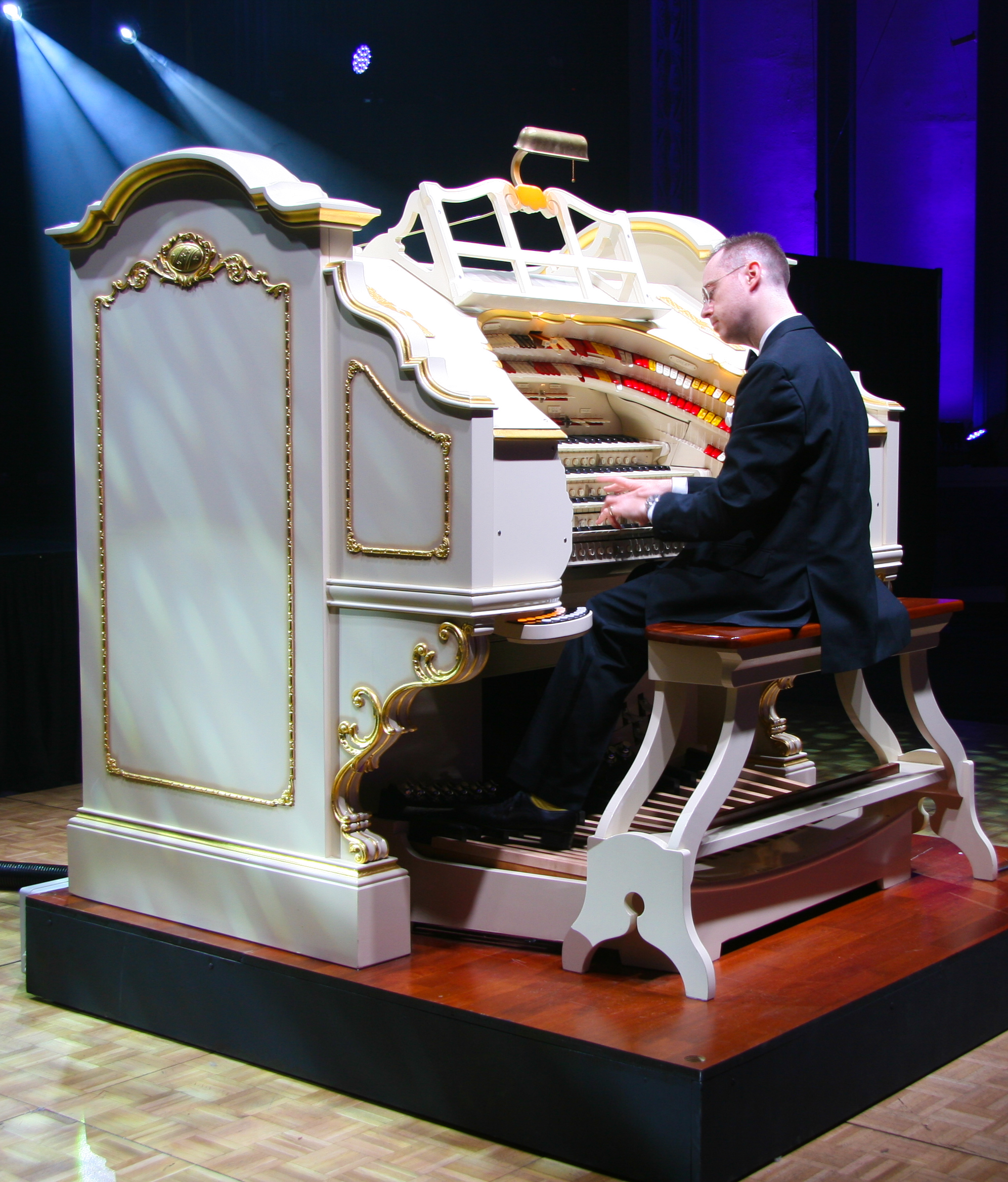
The Troxy Wurlitzer console

One of the unique attractions of Troxy is its Wurlitzer organ, the largest Wurlitzer theatre pipe organ in Europe, which was restored to its original condition in 2015 as the culmination of a six-year project at a cost of £275,000.

The Wurlitzer has 1,728 pipes measuring between 16 feet (4.9 m) to 1 inch (25 mm) and is housed in four separate rooms. It has four keyboards, one pedal board and 241 stop keys.

The organ was originally in the Trocadero Cinema in Elephant and Castle, the sister theatre of Troxy, which opened in 1930. It was much larger than the original Wurlitzer at Troxy, which did not survive intact after the venue closed as a cinema. The Trocadero was pulled down in 1963 but the organ had been purchased by the Cinema Organ Society three years previously and escaped the demolition. It was announced it was being moved to Troxy in 2009, bringing the instrument back to the sort of venue it was originally designed for.

Rated as one of the finest in the world, the Wurlitzer's console can be moved around inside Troxy depending on the occasion. The use of the Wurlitzer is offered to anyone using the venue for their function, and special events are held so people can hear it played.

== Awards ==
Troxy has won many awards over the years. In 2013, it was named Venue of the Year at the Eventex Awards and won bronze in the Unusual Venue category at the M&IT Awards in the same year. In 2014, Troxy was overall winner of the Eventia Best Venue Team and was named overall winner of Best Venue Team at the Live UK Music Business Awards, which it repeated in the same category in 2016.

Also in 2014 Troxy was highly commended in the Best Venue Space category at the Event Magazine Awards, an event it hosted. Troxy was a finalist for Best Venue at the Evcom Live Awards 2015, and a finalist in the Best Venue Category at the Event Production Awards in the same year.

In 2016 Troxy was awarded the Mark of Excellence in the London Venue Awards and named winners of the Best Venue Teamwork Theatre/Concert Hall at the Live UK Music Business Awards. It was also crowned Best Awards Venue at the inaugural Awards Awards. Helping make 2016 a year to remember was being names the bronze winner for Use of Venue at the EVCOM Live Awards.

In October 2017, Troxy was also crowned 'Best London Event Venue – 500 to 1,000 attendees' at the London Venue Awards.

== Transport ==
Troxy is close to Limehouse station which is served by Docklands Light Railway (DLR) and National Rail services. c2c trains, to and from Fenchurch Street Station, to Shoeburyness and Grays in Essex stop at Limehouse. Limehouse Station is in zone two, and sits between Shadwell and Westferry stations on the DLR. Troxy is located on the A13, also known as Commercial Road. The building is served by the following bus numbers; 15,115, 135, D3, N15, N550, N551
