= The Fairer Fostering Partnership =

UK fostering agency consortium

Fairer Fostering
- The Fairer Fostering Partnership
- Legal status: Consortium of charitable and not-for-profit fostering agencies
- Purpose: To support those who undertake fostering for the sake of children, not for profit.
- Chair: Andy Elvin, TACT
- Website: www.fairerfostering.org.uk

The Fairer Fostering Partnership (Fairer Fostering) is a UK-wide consortium of voluntary and not for profit fostering agencies, whose members look after over 2,000 children in care. Its ethos is to support those who undertake fostering for the sake of children, rather than profit. Fairer Fostering also has a lobbying function that aims to advocate for children in respect of regulation, as well as representing its membership within central government.

== Fairer Fostering Member Agencies ==
The current member agencies that make up The Fairer Fostering Partnership are:

- Barnardo's
- Break Charity
- The Children's Family Trust
- Community Foster Care
- The Foster Care Co-operative
- Kasper Fostering
- St Christopher’s Fellowship
- TACT Fostering
- Team Fostering
- Young People At Heart

== Chairpersons ==
Current Chair:
Andy Elvin (2017 - to date) - the CEO of TACT Fostering.

Former Chairs:
Walter Young (2015 - to date) Alan Fisher (2012 - 2015)

== In the press ==
- On 25 June 2015, FtSE issued a joint statement with NAFP, urging the Government to support all children in care to secure a permanent home without delay
- On 9 October 2013, FtSE Chair, Alan Fisher, co-signed an open letter to the House of Lords, along with 39 other charities, to amend the Children and Families Bill, allowing foster children to remain with their families until the age of 21.
- On 14 August 2013, FtSE Chair, Alan Fisher, wrote an article about Worcestershire council's proposal to charge parents when their children are taken into care.
- On 13 March 2013, FtSE was one of 11 signatories of in an open letter to the ministers asking them to reconsider the Government's proposed bedroom tax.
- On 22 May 2012, FtSE founding member and Chief Executive of Community Foster Care, Rebekah Pearson, joined a live discussion on recruiting and retaining foster carers.
- On 18 September 2009, FtSE and then Chair, Alan Fisher, were cited in an article in Community Care entitled Social enterprises draw positive response from social workers.
