= Everyman Cinema, Muswell Hill =

Cinema in Muswell Hill, London, England

Coordinates: 51.5896°N 0.1462°W

The Everyman Cinema in 2021

The Everyman Cinema, formerly the Odeon, is a cinema in Muswell Hill in north London, It was designed in the Art Deco style by the architect George Coles, and was constructed in 1935-1936 as a purpose-built cinema. It was designated as a grade II* listed building by Historic England in 1984.

It has a double-height auditorium and foyer, and was convered to a triple cinema in 1974, with two smaller cinemas being constructed in the area under the main auditorium's balcony. The cinema has a cafe/bar (formerly a tea-room), and now serves food and drink during performances.

It was purchased by Everyman Media Group in 2015 and, after refurbishment, reopened in 2016 with their Everyman Cinema branding. Like other British cinemas, it closed from 2020 until early 2021 because of the COVID-19 pandemic.

The cinema adjoins the grade II listed parade of shops at 107–123 Muswell Hill Road, which was constructed at the same time as the cinema.

== Gallery ==
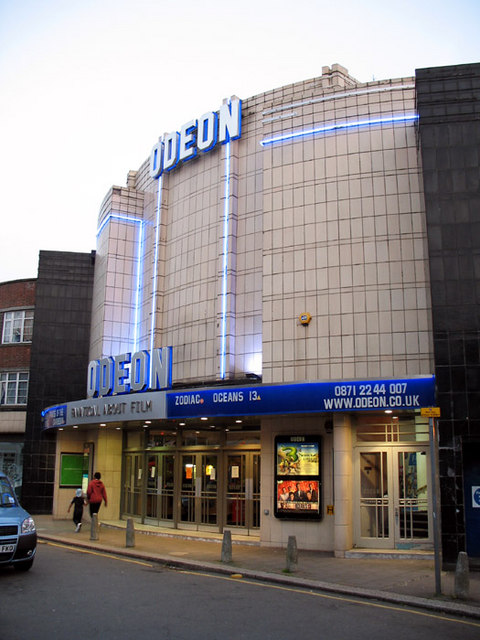
The cinema in its Odeon branding in 2007

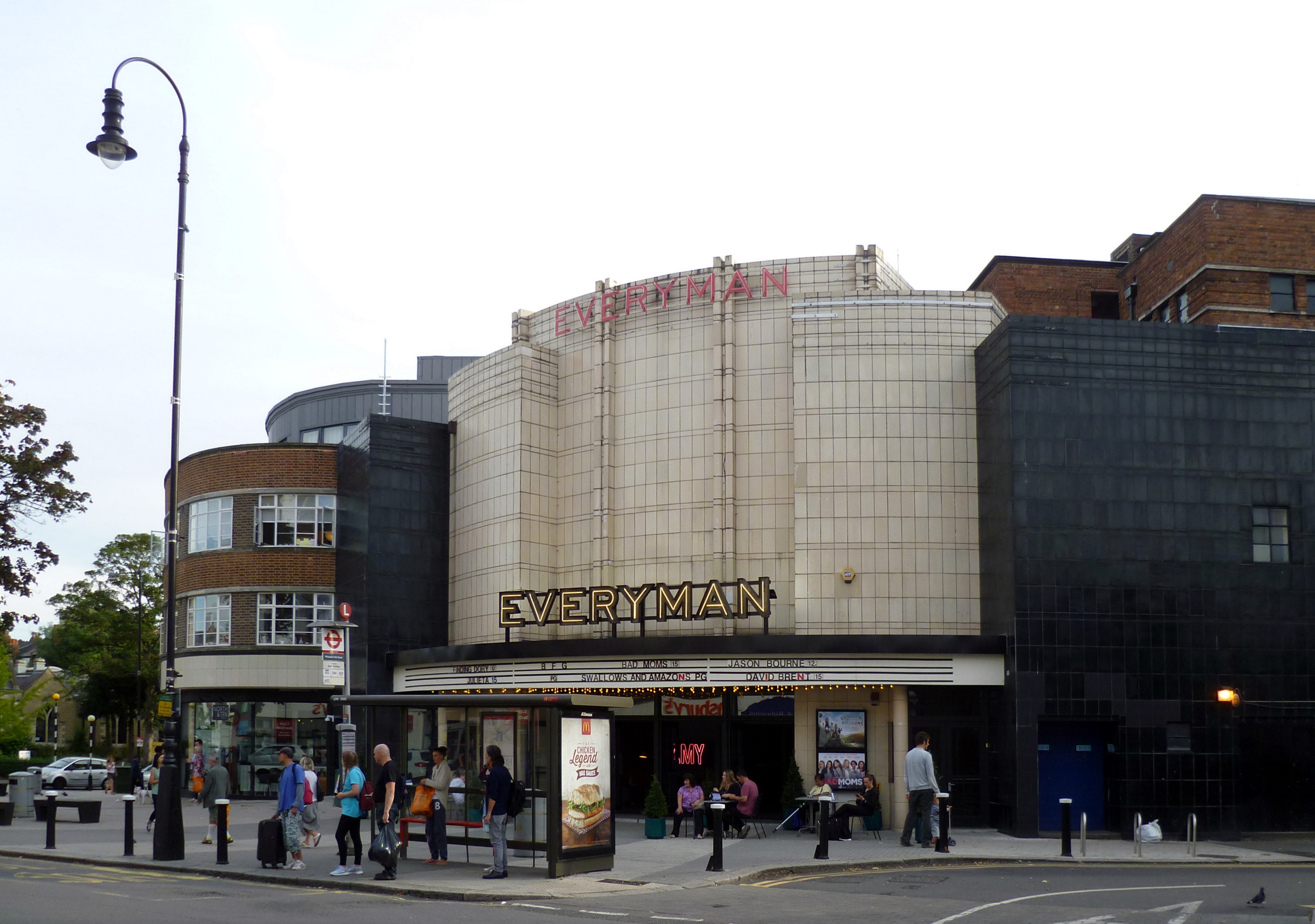
The cinema and its surrounding buildings.

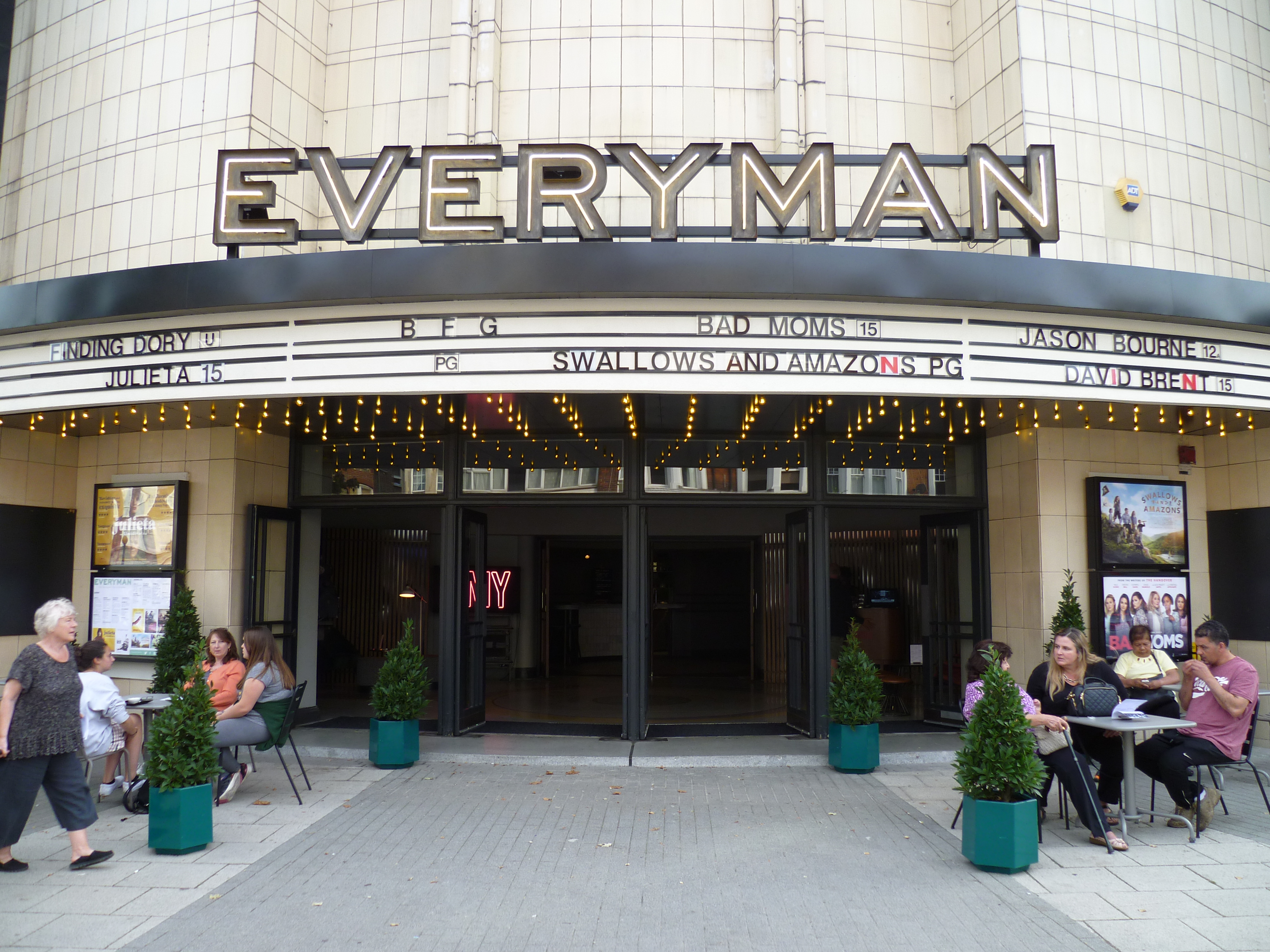
The entrance in 2016.

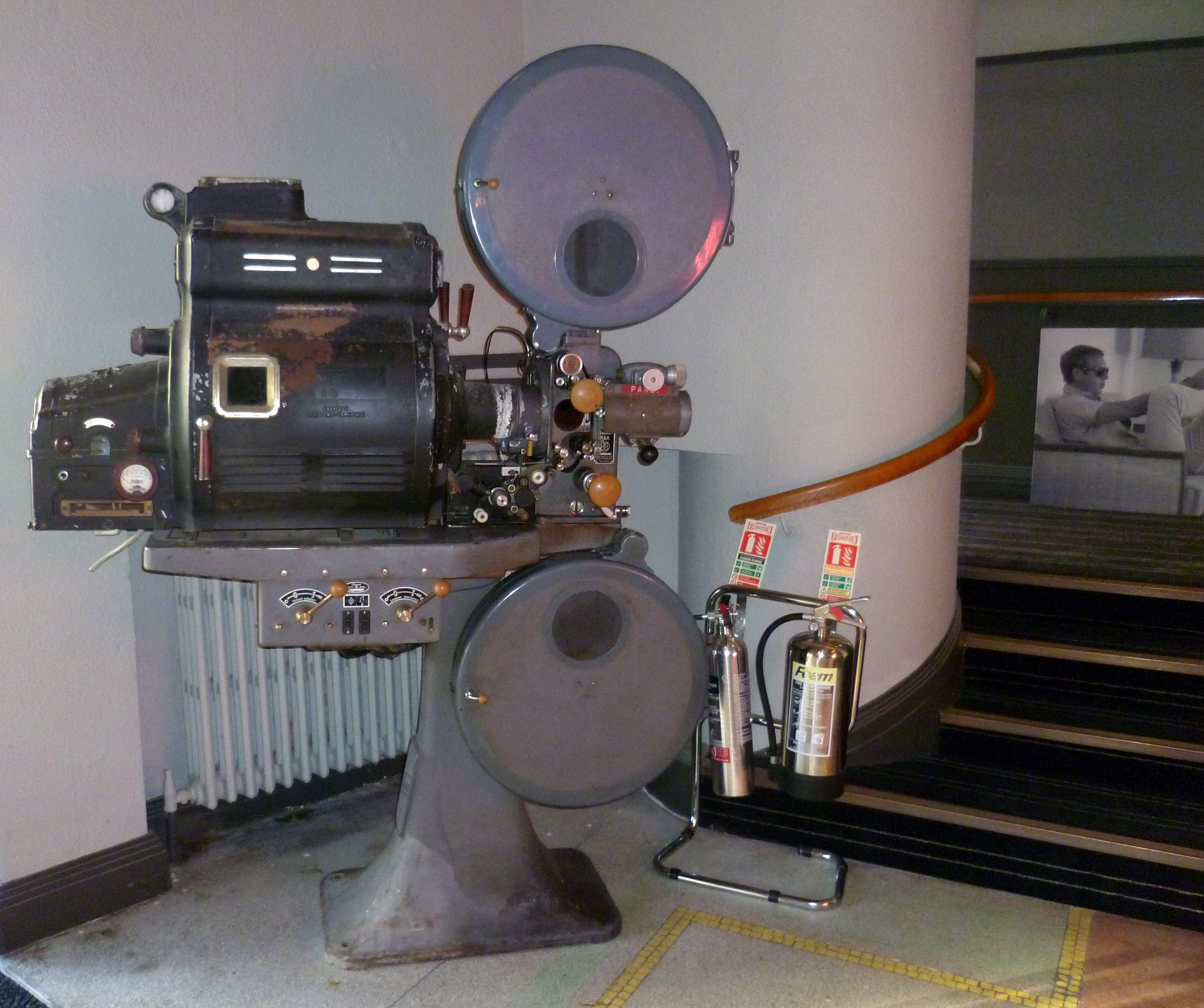
Projector in the lobby.

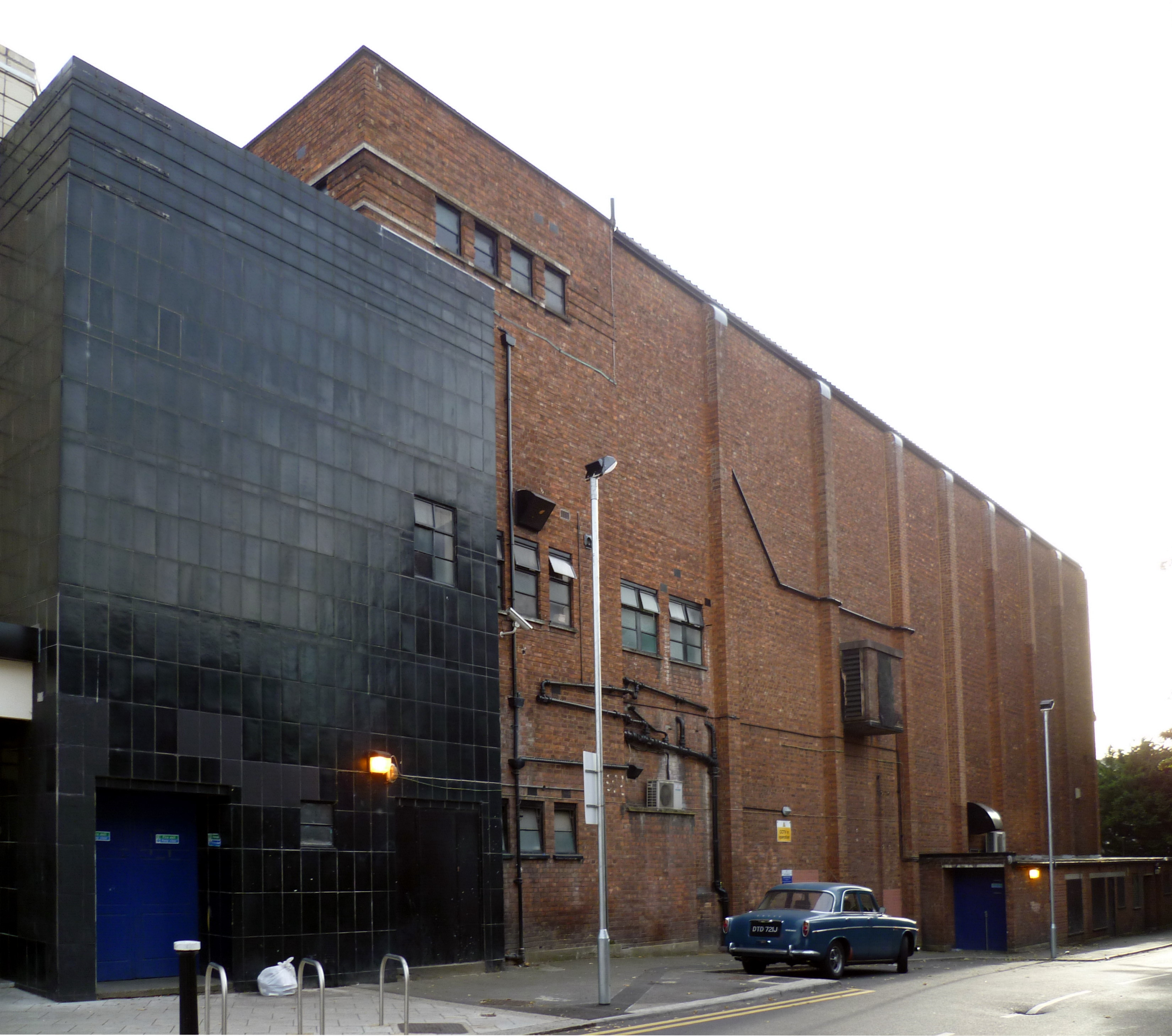
Side view.
