= Alchevsky Mansion =

Alchevsky Mantion
- Особняк Алчевських
- Interactive map of Alchevsky Mantion
- Location: Ukraine, Kharkiv, Zhon Myronosyts Street, 13
- Coordinates: 49°59′56.53″N 36°14′23.75″E
- Designer: Oleksiy Mykolayovych Beketov
- Type: mansion
- Material: brick
- Height: 2 floors
- Completion date: 1893
- Heritage status: Monument of architecture and urban planning of local significance of Ukraine No. 7088-Ха, monument of history of local significance of Ukraine No. 78

The Alchevsky Mansion (Ukrainian: Особняк Алчевських, romanized: Osobniak Alchevs'kykh) is the former mansion of the prominent Alchevsky family, built in 1893 according to the design of Oleksiy Mykolayovych Beketov in the center of Kharkiv at 13 Zhon Myronosyts Street. The building is included in the list of architectural and urban planning monuments of local significance (security number 7088-Ха) and in the list of historical monuments of local significance (security number 78). Currently, the building houses the Palace of Culture of the Main Department of the National Police in the Kharkiv Oblast.

== History ==
=== Construction ===
In 1862, the founder of the Kharkiv Commercial and Land Banks, Ukrainian industrialist, banker, public figure, and philanthropist Oleksiy Kyrylovych Alchevsky married Ukrainian teacher, organizer of public education, philanthropist, writer, and founder of the Kharkiv Women's Sunday School Khrystyna Danylivna Zhuravlyova. In 1889, their daughter married Kharkiv architect Oleksiy Mykolayovych Beketov, who in 1893 built a luxurious Renaissance-style mansion surrounded by a garden for the Alchevsky family on the modern Zhon Myronosyts Street (then Kasperivskyi Lane). The owner of the house was Oleksiy Alchevsky's wife, Khrystyna Alchevska (née Zhuravlyova). In 1896, he built a building for Alchevska's Sunday School on the same street, and in 1897, his own mansion opposite the Alchevsky house.

=== Shevchenko Monument ===
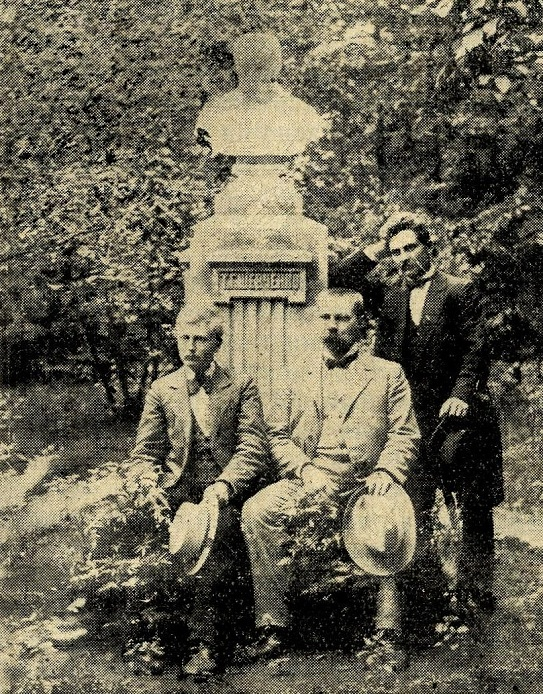
Monument to Shevchenko. In the photo: L. Matsiievych, M. Mikhnovsky і S. Pankivskyi

In 1900, the first monument to Taras Hryhorovych Shevchenko in Ukraine was erected on the territory of the garden in the Alchevsky estate, despite the official ban of the tsarist authorities. The figure of the poet was especially revered in the family of educators Alchevsky. The bust of the poet was made of white marble by sculptor Volodymyr Beklemishev, almost the same age as Beketov, and like the latter, he also graduated from Maria Raevska-Ivanova's drawing school in Kharkiv and the St. Petersburg Academy of Arts. Student youth, Sunday school students, budding poets and guests of the Alchevsky family, including, for example, Ukrainian political and public figure Mykola Ivanovych Mikhnovsky, the first aviator of Ukrainian origin, public and political figure Levko Makarovich Matsievich, Ukrainian actor Severyn Fedorovych Pankivskyi and others, often gathered near this monument.

The family happiness of the Alchevsky family did not last long. In 1901, the head of the family, Oleksiy Alchevsky, tragically died at the Varshavsky Railway Station in St. Petersburg. The family's house, the Beketov mansion and the Sunday School were put up for sale to cover debts. The new owner of the estate became the Active State Councillor Mykola Pompeiovych Shabelsky. Khrystyna Alchevska took an obligation from him not to reconstruct or demolish either the estate or the monument to Taras Shevchenko, not to build or install any new structures or monuments.

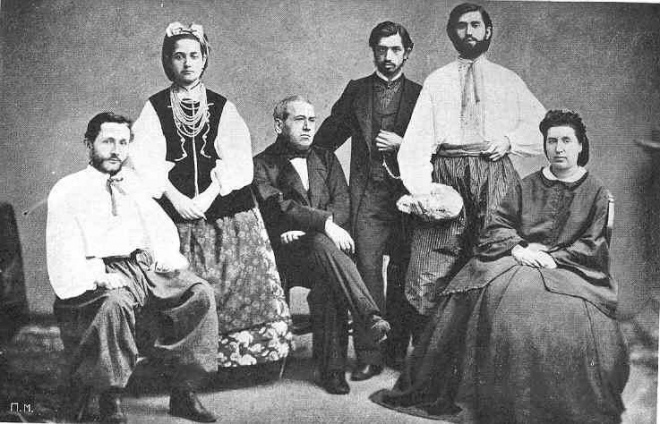
Sitting on the left is Oleksiy Alchevsky, behind him is Khrystyna Alchevska. Standing are probably Khrystyna's brothers: Mykhailo and Leontiy, sitting is her father, Danylo Zhuravlev. 1860s.

Presumably, later the new owner violated the obligation and the Alchevsky family took the Shevchenko bust back, where it was kept until 1932. In the early 1930s, when the Shevchenko Art Gallery was opened in Kharkiv, a teacher at the local law institute, the son of Oleksiy Kyrylovych, Alchevsky Mykola Oleksiyovych (1872–1942) donated the monument to its collection. After the end of World War II, the bust was restored and sent to the Kyiv Taras Shevchenko National Museum, where it is currently on display. The pedestal of the monument is lost.

=== Nationalization ===
In 1917, the house was nationalized. By order of one of the organizers of the "Red Terror", Felix Dzerzhinsky, in 1921, the club of the All-Russian Extraordinary Commission for Combating Counter-Revolution, which was especially known for its atrocities in Kharkiv, was located in the building of former educators and philanthropists. From the side of the garden in 1945 and in the 1950s (architect Chornomochenko M. F.) extensions were made, which completely destroyed the courtyard facade of the monument, of which only the front part remained.

In 1997, the chapel of Archangel Michael and the bell tower were built on the territory of the estate (according to the design by Volodymyr Novgorodov), and in 1995, a monument to law enforcement officers who died in the line of duty. The monument in the form of Archangel Michael, who defeats the hydra with a sword pointing down as a personification of crime. Authors: sculptor A. N. Ilyichov, architect S. G. Chechelnytskyi. The building has a concert hall and the Kharkiv Maritime Museum operated. Currently, the building houses the Palace of Culture of the Main Department of the National Police in the Kharkiv region. Concerts and creative meetings are held in the building's hall.

=== Architecture ===
The mansion is a small Italian-style villa-palace surrounded by a lush garden. Built according to the design of architect Oleksiy Mykolayovych Beketov in the style of Italian suburban villas of the late Renaissance, it was originally surrounded on all sides by open terraces. The preserved front parts are distinguished by the harmony of decoration in the forms of late classicism. The facades are decorated with bas-reliefs on plant themes and with images of children, pilasters, and cornices. Caryatids with Ionic order capitals are located between the windows of the second floor. The roofs of the building and terraces had a balustrade, which has been only partially preserved. The building is light and cozy, in the style of its owners, the Alchevskys, who attached great importance to philanthropy, education, and progress. The garden in the estate has not been preserved, now there is a square with modern plantings in its place.

== Gallery ==
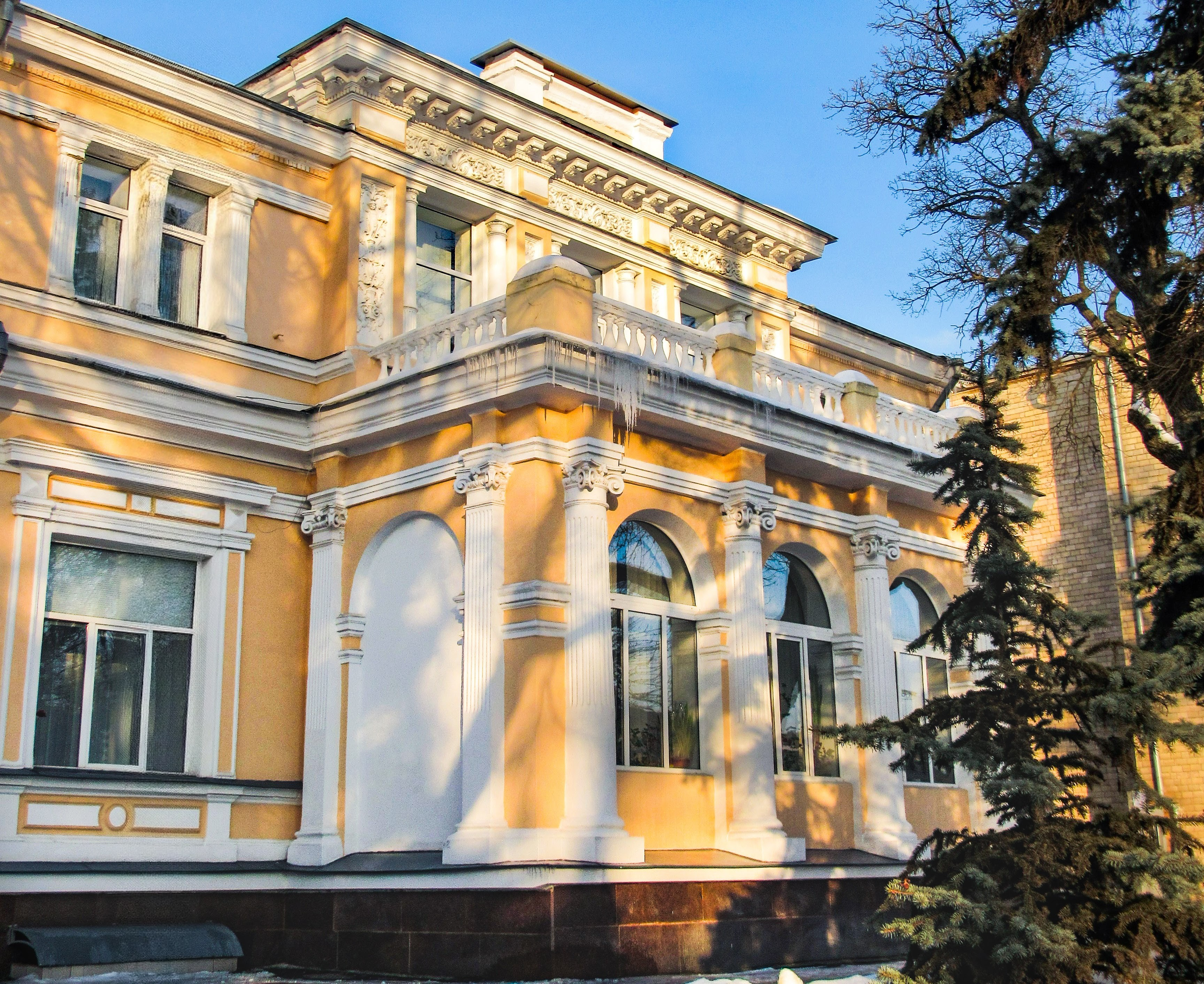
General view of the building

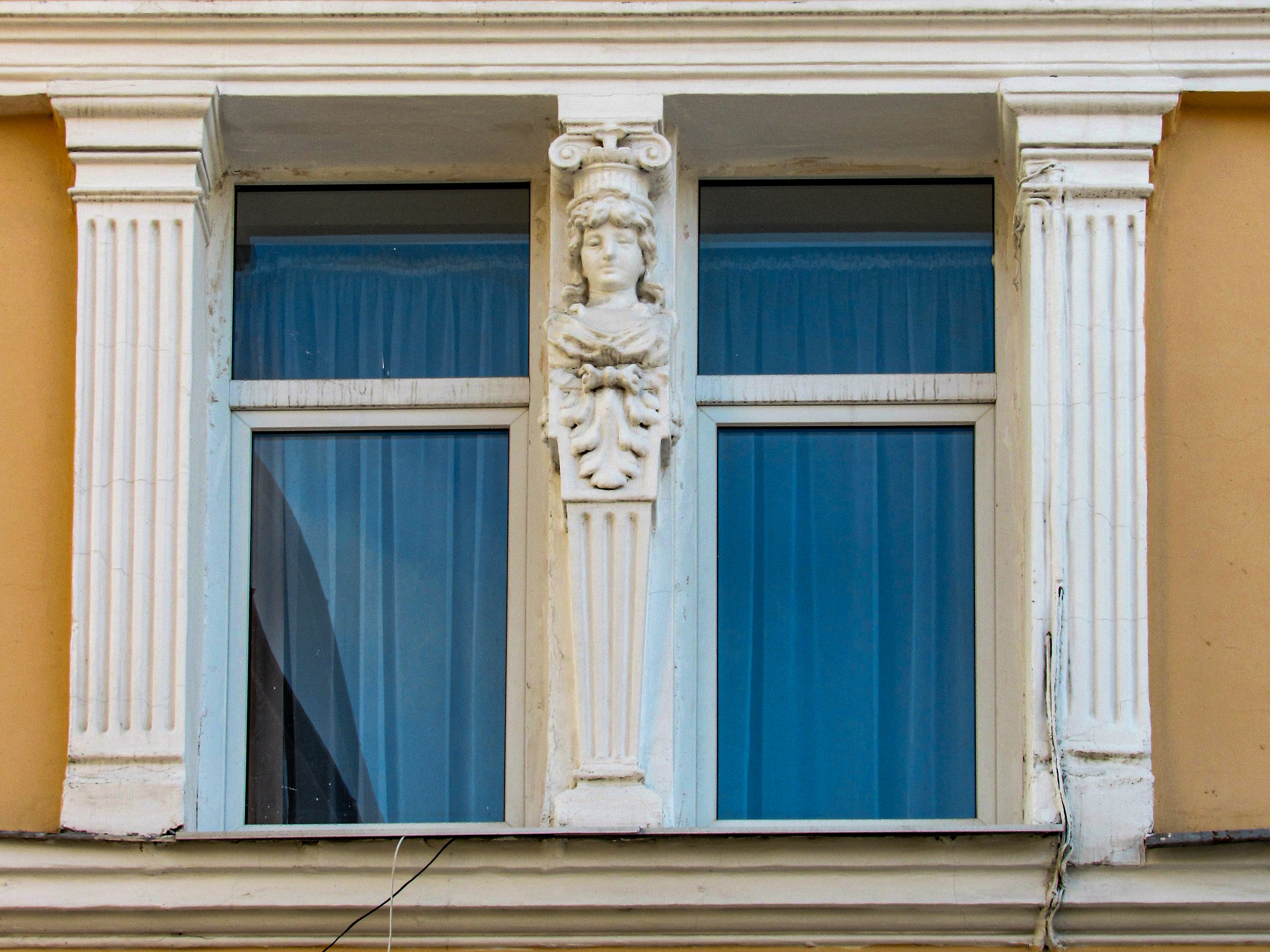
Caryatid

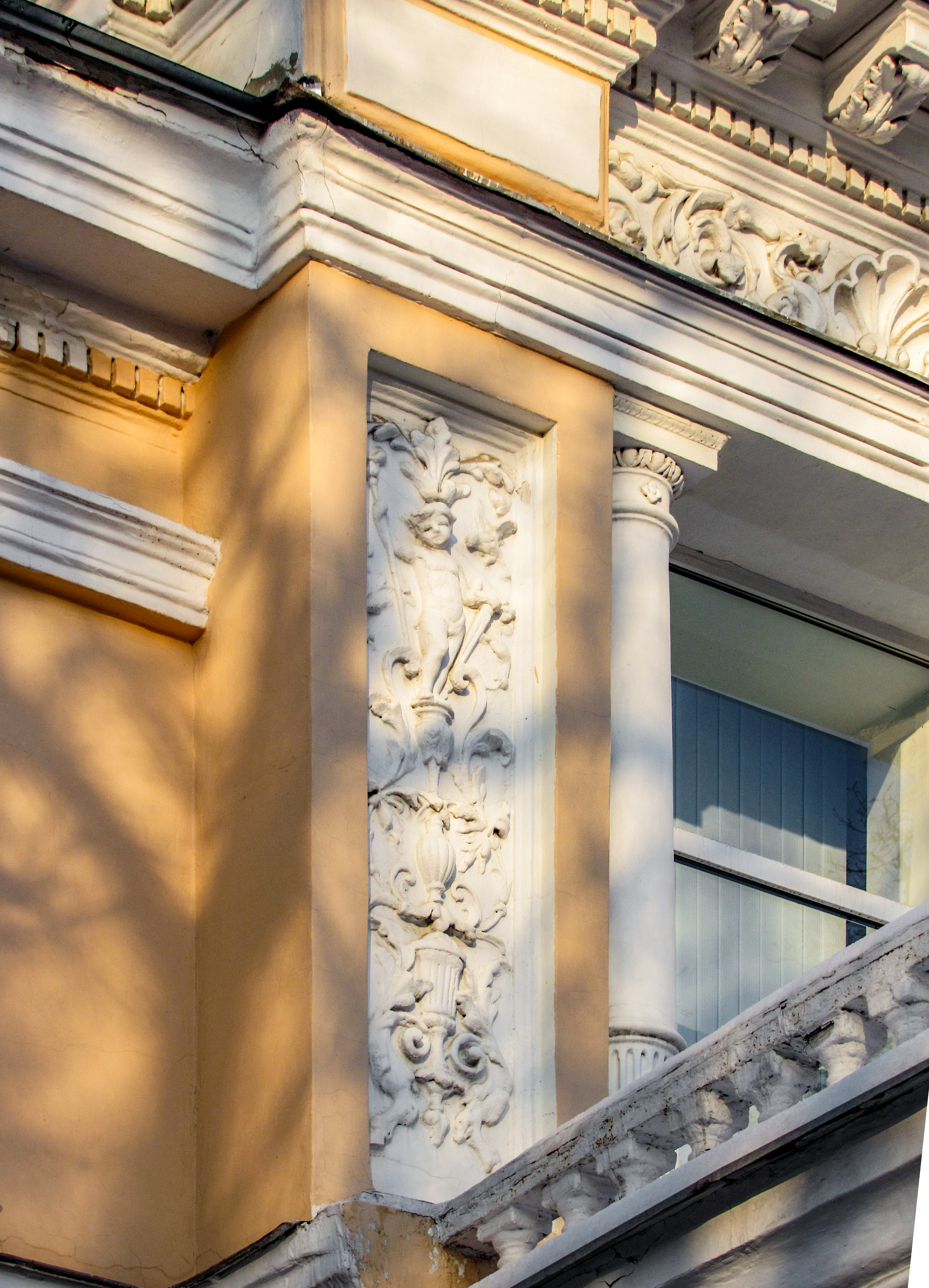
Bas-Relief

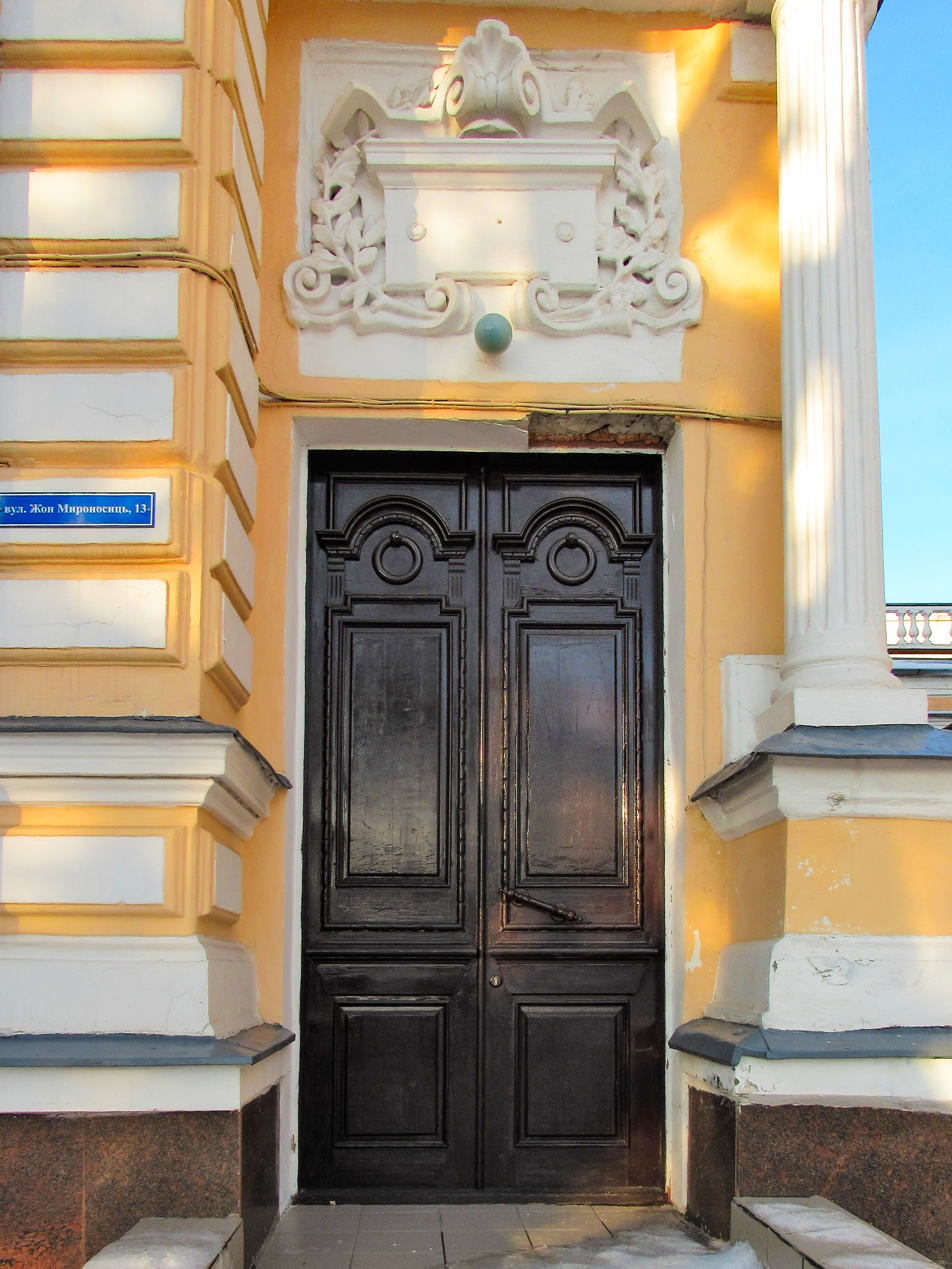
Authentic wooden doors

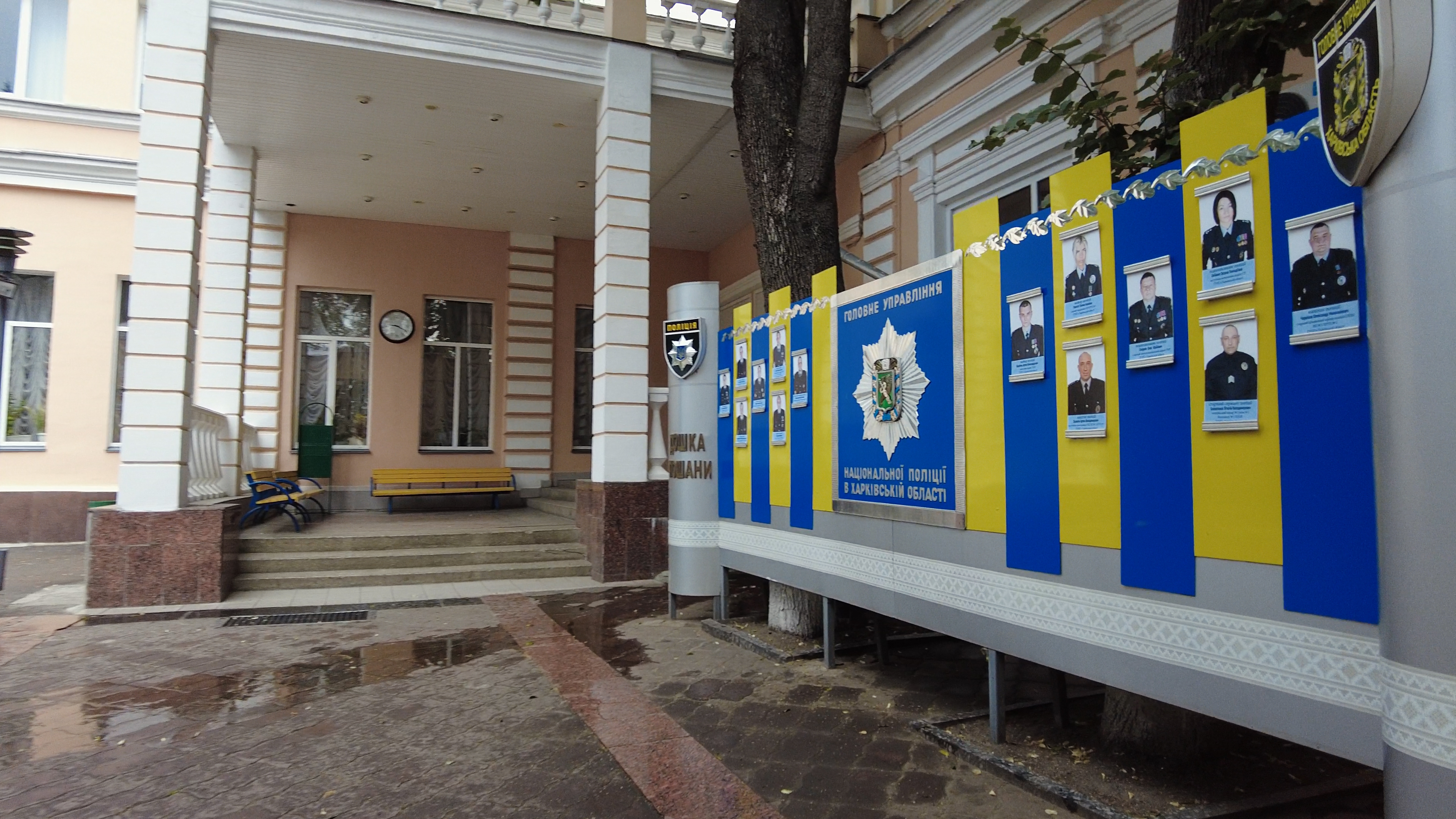
Modern entrance

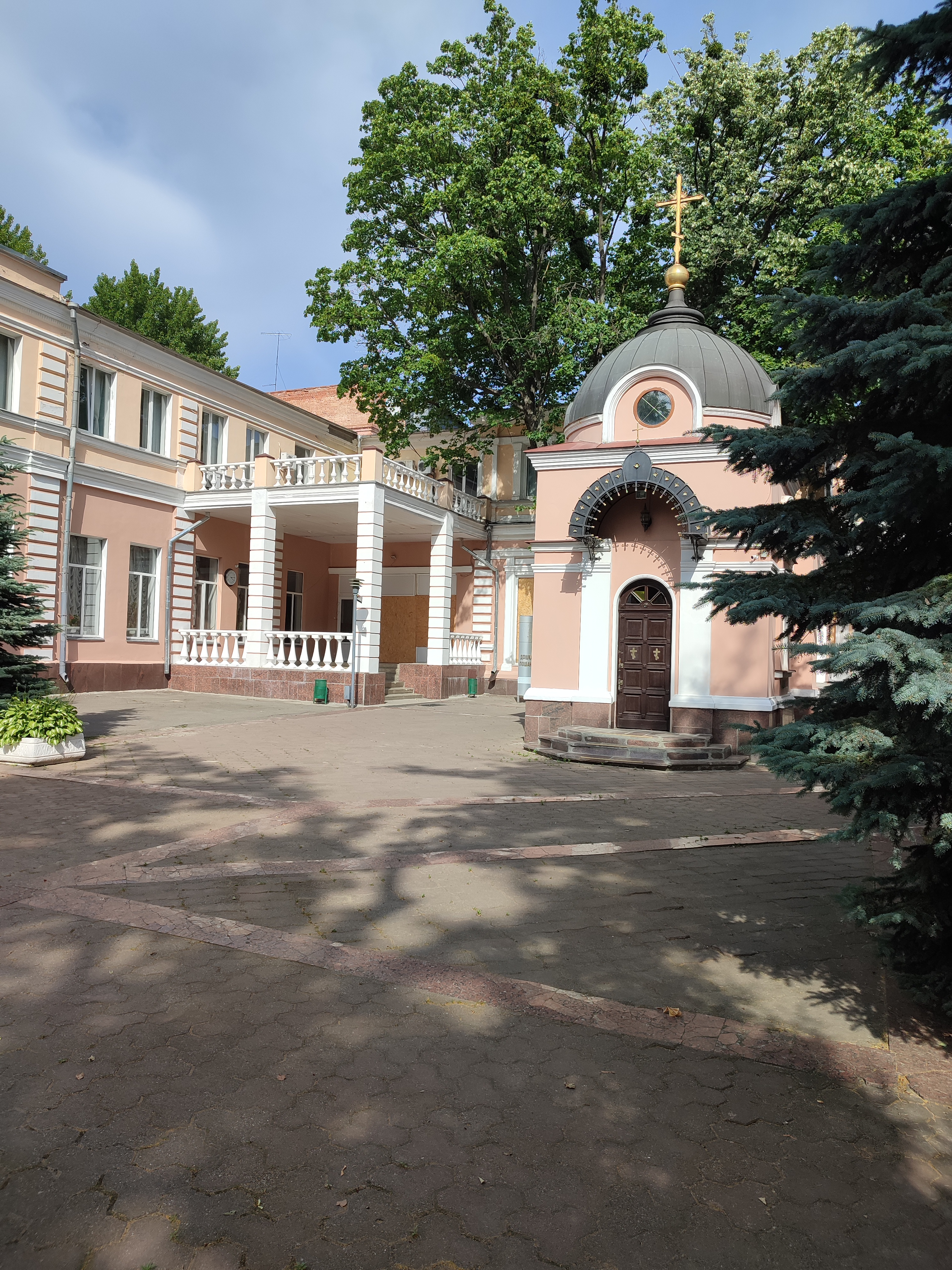
Chapel of the Archangel Michael

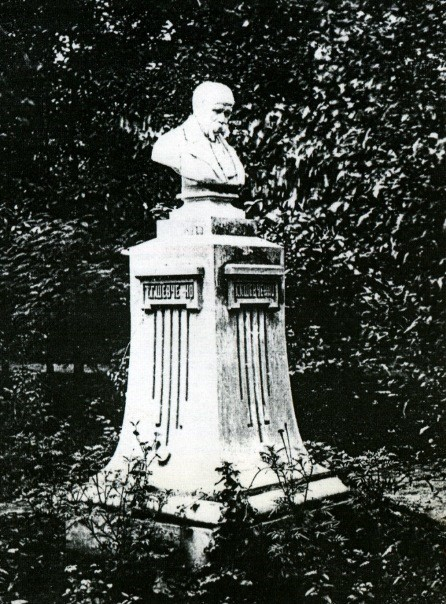
Monument to Taras Shevchenko

== See also ==
- Alchevsky family
- Monument to Taras Shevchenko (Alchevsky Mansion)

== Sources ==
- "Особняк Алчевських". Харківська мапа.
- "Перший пам'ятник Шевченкові". Харківська мапа.
- "Особняк Алчевських в Харкові". zabytki.in.ua.
- "Харьков: новое о знакомых местах. Бекетовские дома в Харькове". ngeorgij.livejournal.com.
- Semenyuk, Mykola. "Найперший пам'ятник Тарасу Шевченку в Україні" (PDF).
