= Sergei Yudin =

Sergei Yudin may refer to:

- Sergei Yudin (tenor) (1889–1963), Russian opera singer, a lyric tenor
- Sergei Yudin (surgeon) (1891–1954), Russian physician who developed early blood bank practices
- Sergei Yudin (chess player) (born 1986), Russian chess grandmaster
