= Kharkiv Land Bank Building =

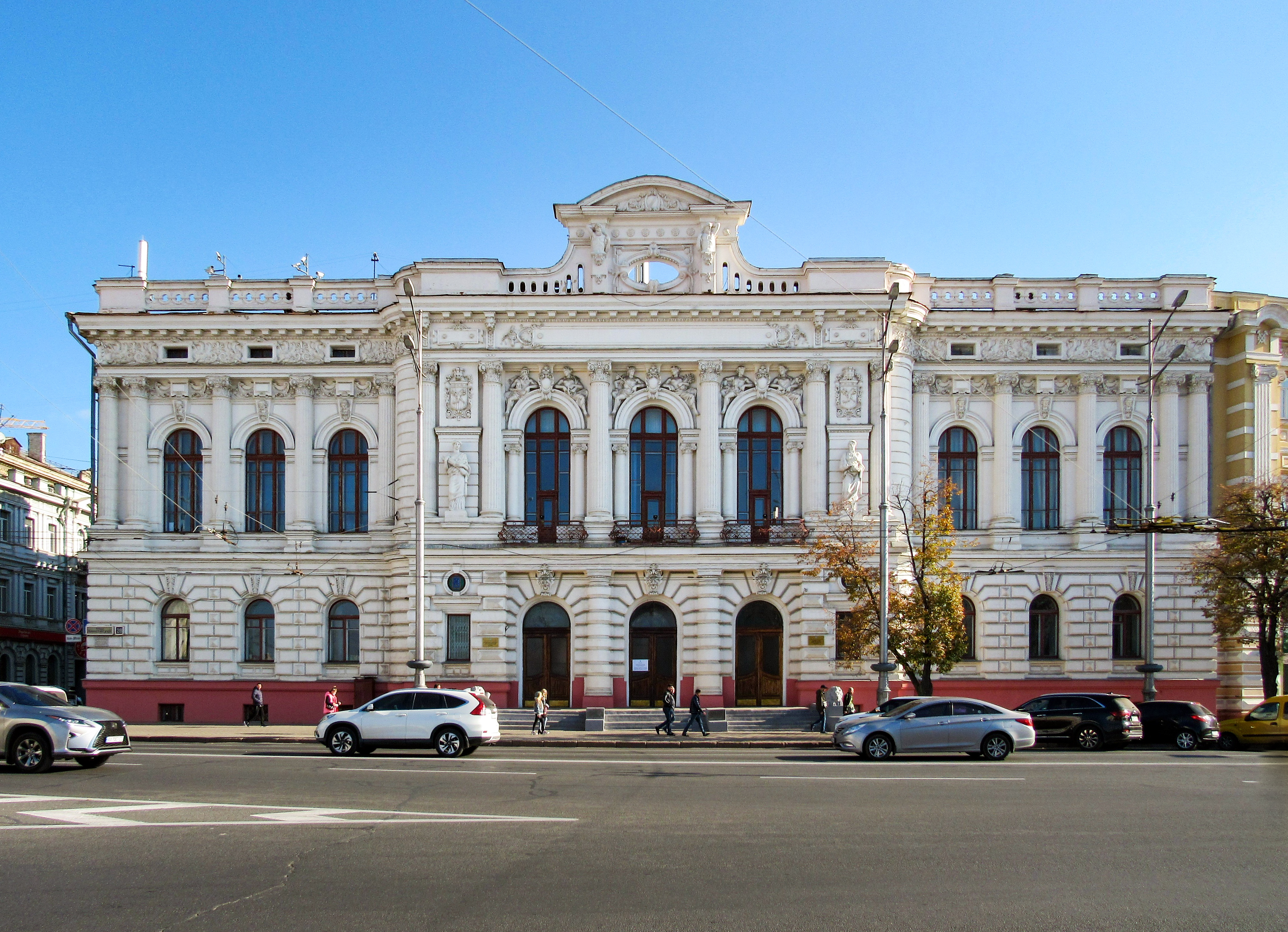
- Interactive map of Kharkiv Land Bank Building
- Location: Ukraine, Kharkiv, Constitution Square, 28
- Coordinates: 49°59′34.41″N 36°13′56.73″E
- Designer: Oleksiy Mykolaovych Beketov
- Builder: Oleksiy Mykolaovych Beketov
- Type: Bank
- Material: brick
- Height: 2–3 floors
- Beginning date: 1896
- Completion date: 1898
- Opening date: September 2, 1871
- Restored date: 1942–1943 – damage and destruction; 1948–1953 – reconstruction with restoration of the original appearance, including the interior; 1980s – restoration with the addition of two sculptures of women; 2003 – sculptures of lions added at the entrance; 2022 – damaged by Russian shelling;
- Heritage status: Monument of architecture and urban planning of local significance of Ukraine № 7126-Ха

The Building of the Kharkiv Land Bank is a two-story historical building, built in the 19th century, located on Constitution Square in the center of Kharkiv. The building is a monument of architecture and urban planning of local significance of Ukraine (No. 7126-Ха).

== History ==
The two-story building, richly decorated with details, was built for the Kharkiv Land Bank in 1896–1898. The architect of the building was the academician of architecture Oleksiy Mykolayovych Beketov, the father-in-law of Oleksiy Alchevsky — the founder of the bank. The building had steam heating, installed by the "Kerting Brothers" company, as well as a water system.

The Neo-Renaissance facade is decorated with pilasters of Composite, Doric and Ionic orders, sculptures, French rustication, medallions, a large number of bas-reliefs, cornices, shields with the city's coat of arms, heads of lions and people, large windows, stained glass windows with the city's and Ukraine's coat of arms, a pediment, a balustrade and balconies.

The Beketov interiors have been preserved in the building: a large hall, an entrance hall and offices. They are decorated with atlantes, many pilasters and bas-reliefs, balustrades, stained glass windows, medallions.

The Kharkiv Land Bank was founded on September 2, 1871, by Oleksiy Alchevsky. The bank operated in the territories of Kharkiv, Katerynoslav, Poltava, Kursk, Voronezh, Oryol, Stavropol, Black Sea and in parts of Tobolsk and Yenisei governorates. It had branches in many Ukrainian cities: Kharkiv, Chuhuiv, Poltava, Yalta, Sumy, Simferopol, Sloviansk, Bakhmut, Starobilsk, Mariupol, etc. The bank issued loans against property and land collateral for 60% of the value of this property and for no more than 66 years and 2 months. The price of the bank's shares in 1914 was 200 rubles.

In 1920, the bank was closed due to the arrival of Bolshevik power in the city. From 1928 to the present day, the Kharkiv Automobile Transport Professional College is located in the building. The large hall of the bank has been turned into a hall for celebrations, the other into a gym, and the former bank premises house the offices of the educational institution.

During the Second World War, the building was badly damaged. In 1948–1953, the building was restored according to the project of architects G. V. Sikharulidze and A. Yu. Leibfreid. In 2003, two lion sculptures were installed in front of the main entrance to the building.

In March 2022, the building was damaged by Russian missile attacks. The windows were broken in the building.

== Gallery ==
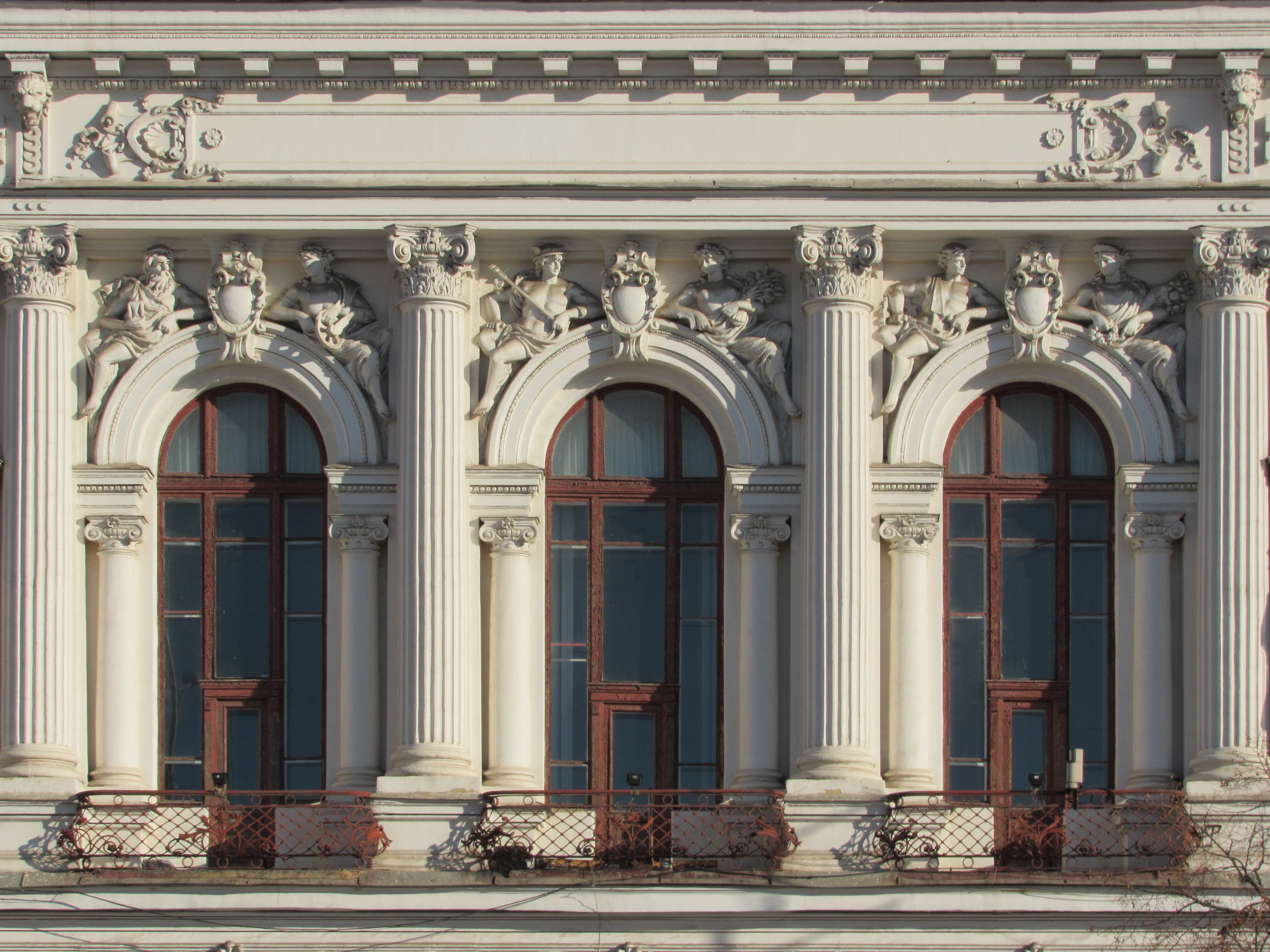
Second floor facade

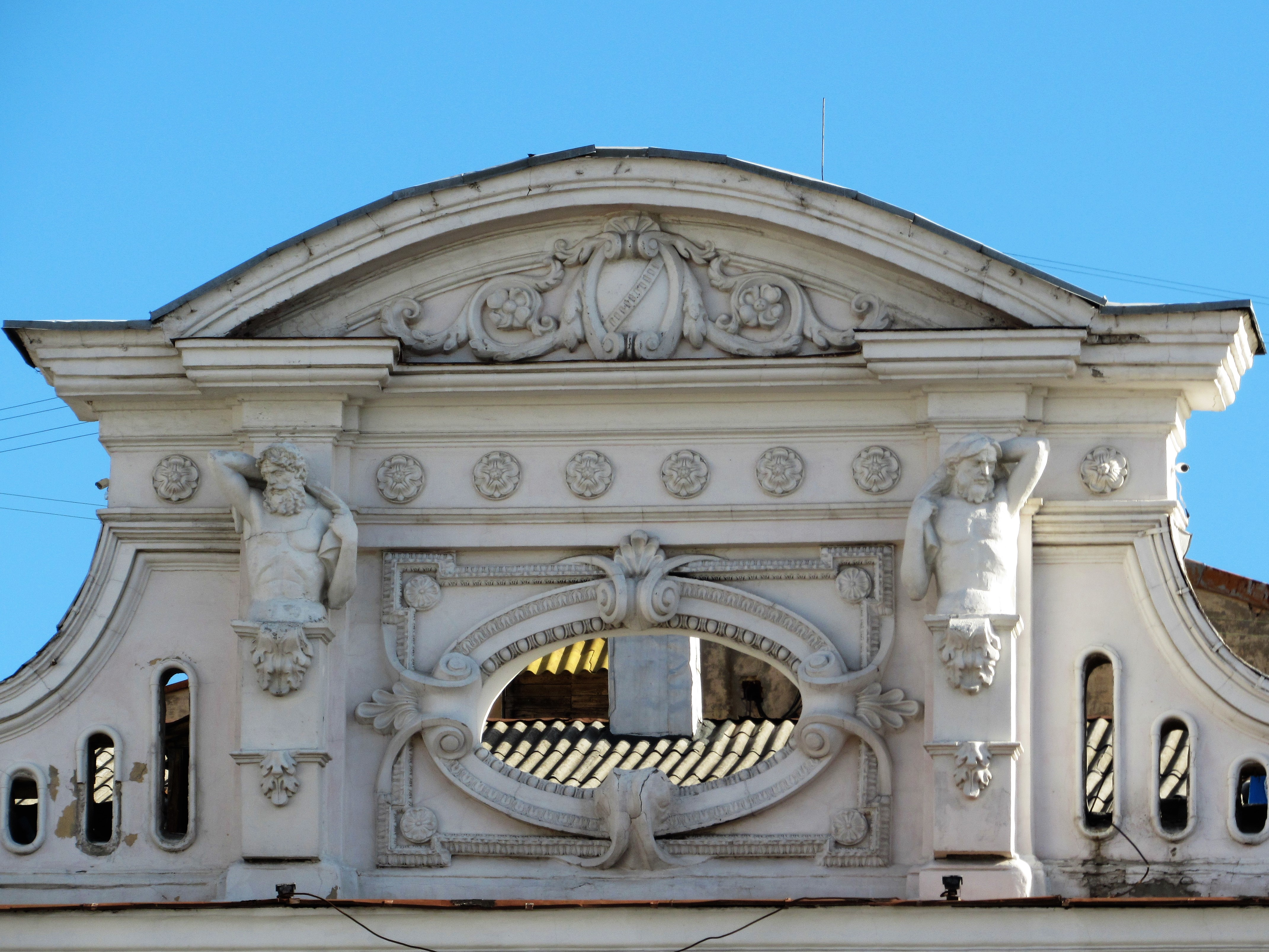
Pediment

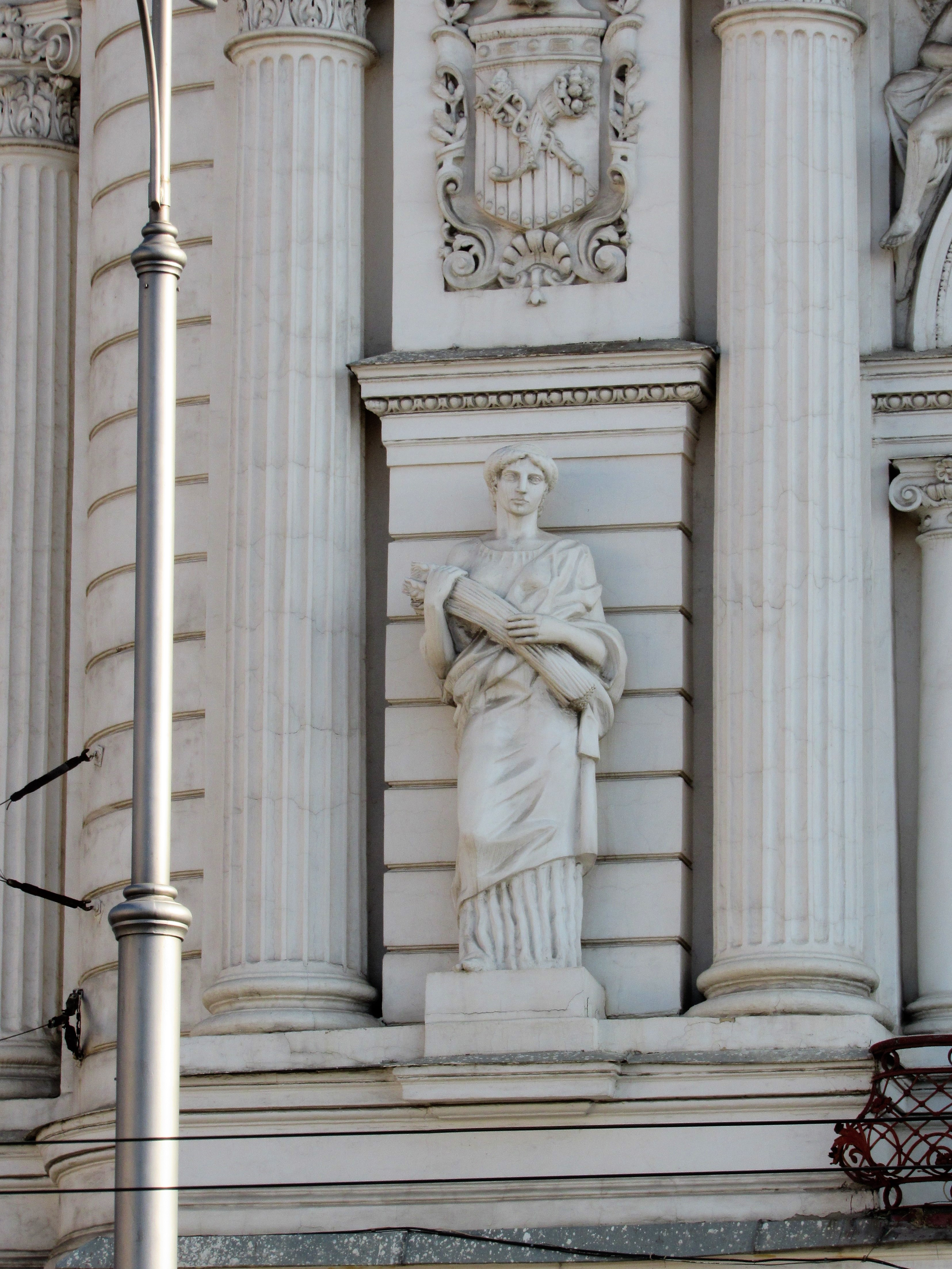
One of the sculptures (left)

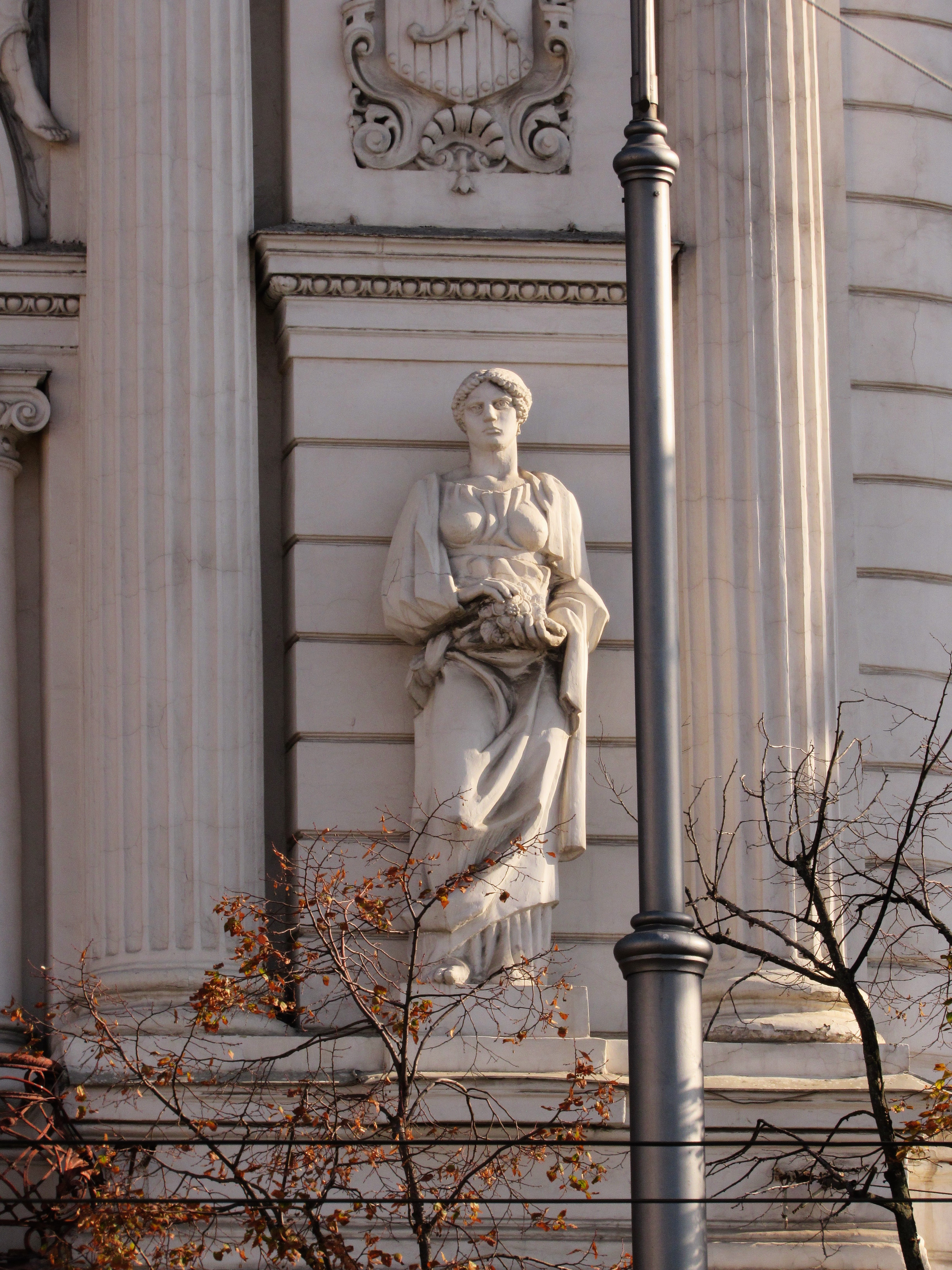
One of the sculptures (right)

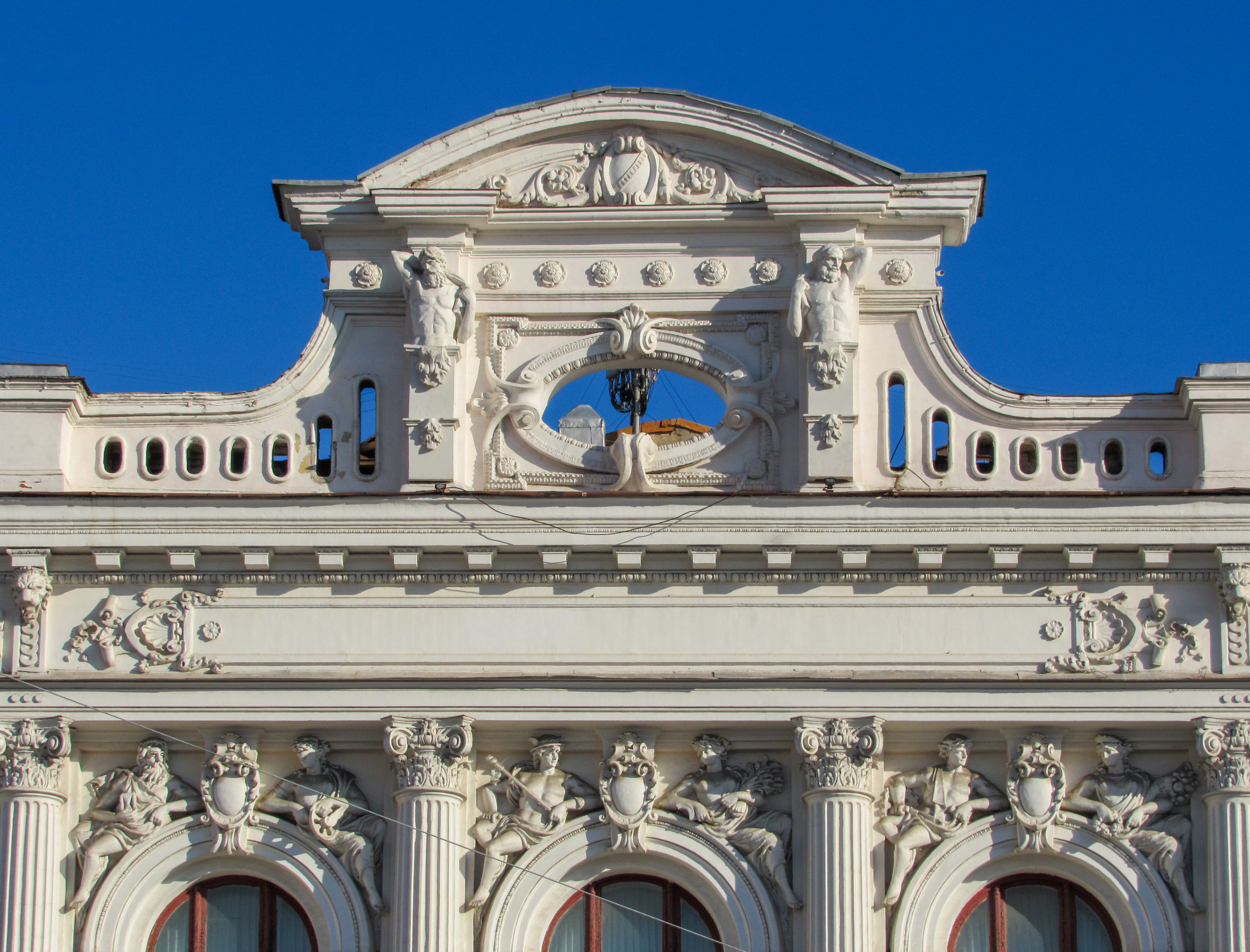
Facade details

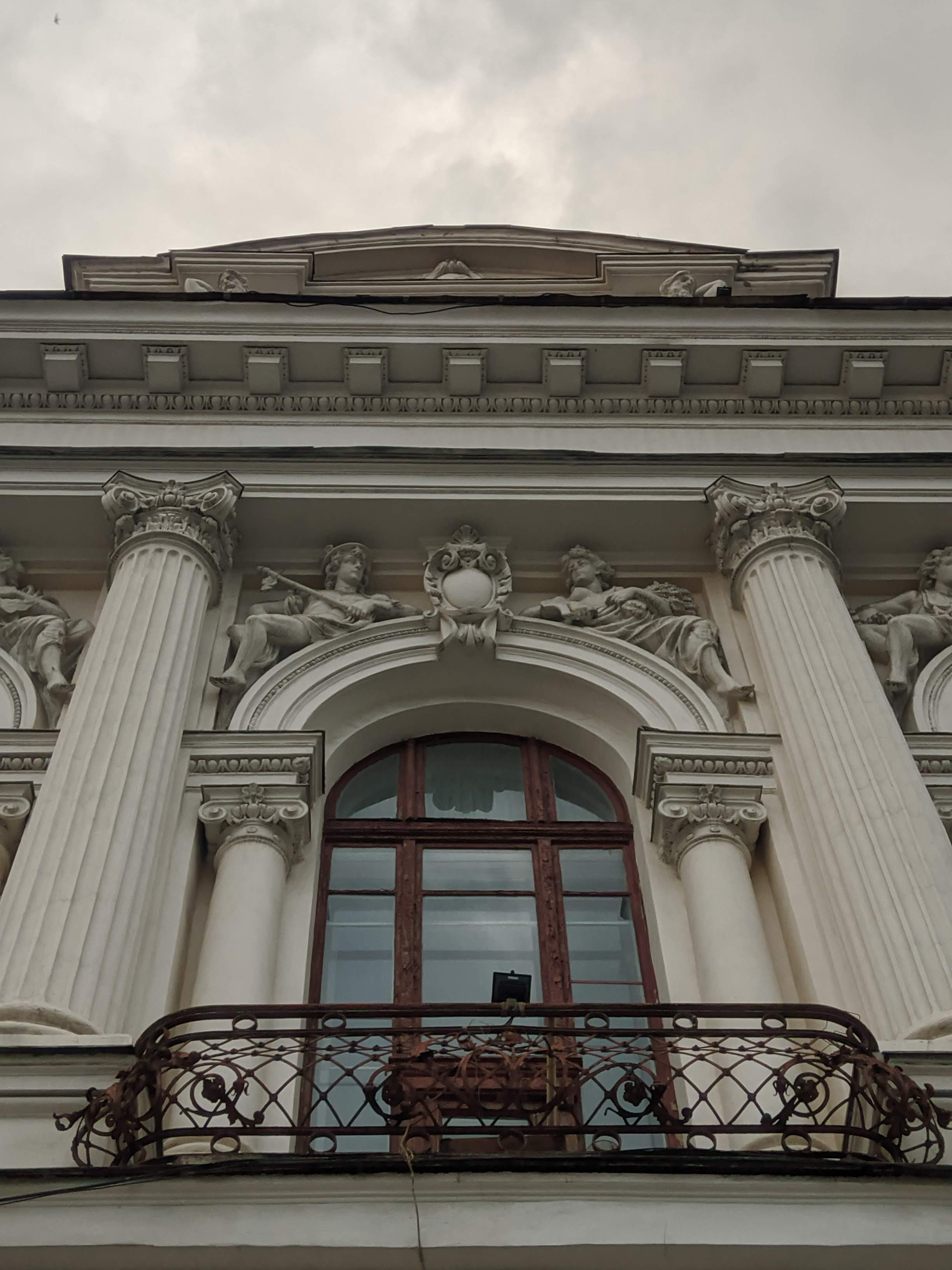
Facade details

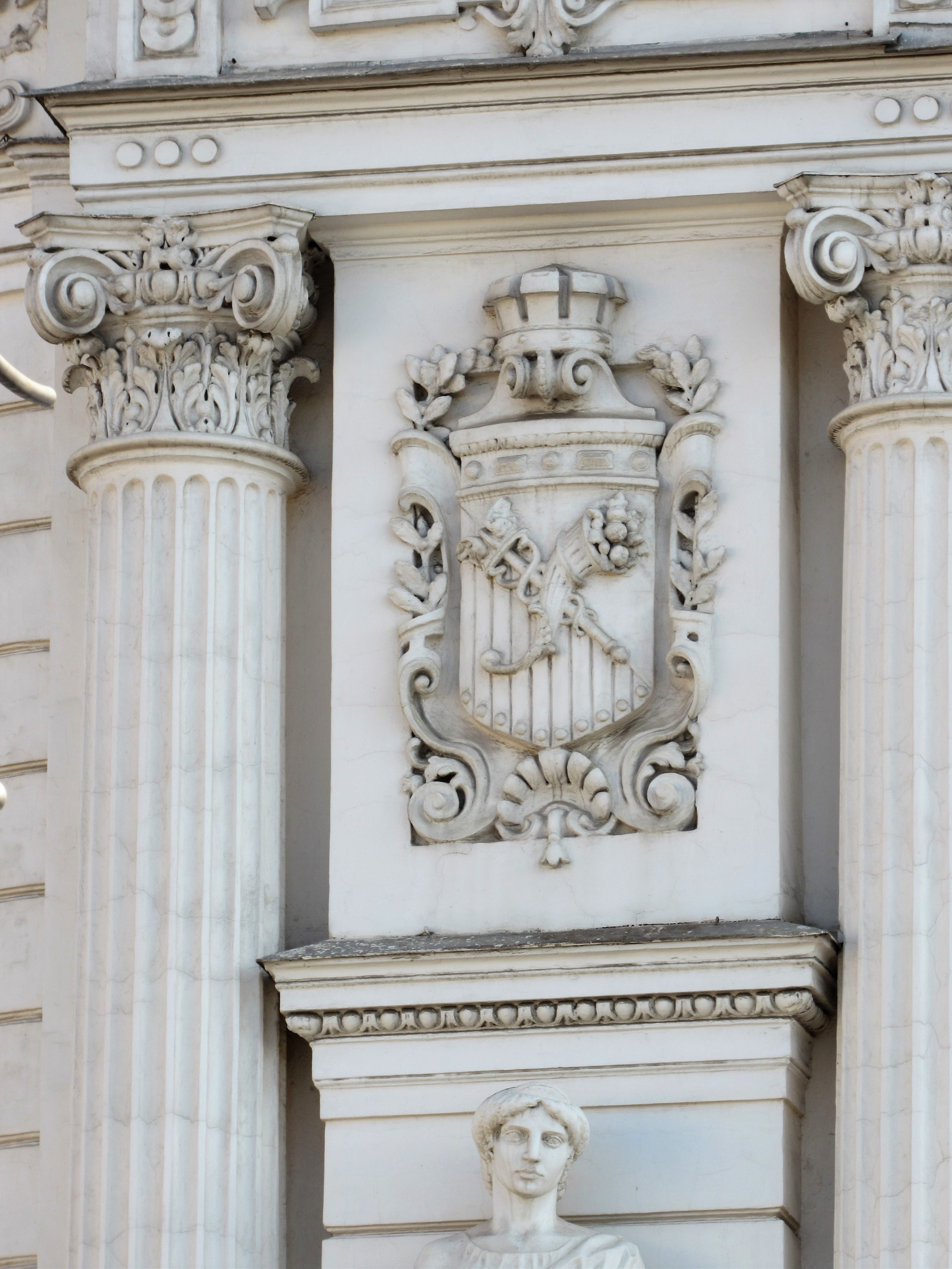
Coat of arms of Kharkiv on the building

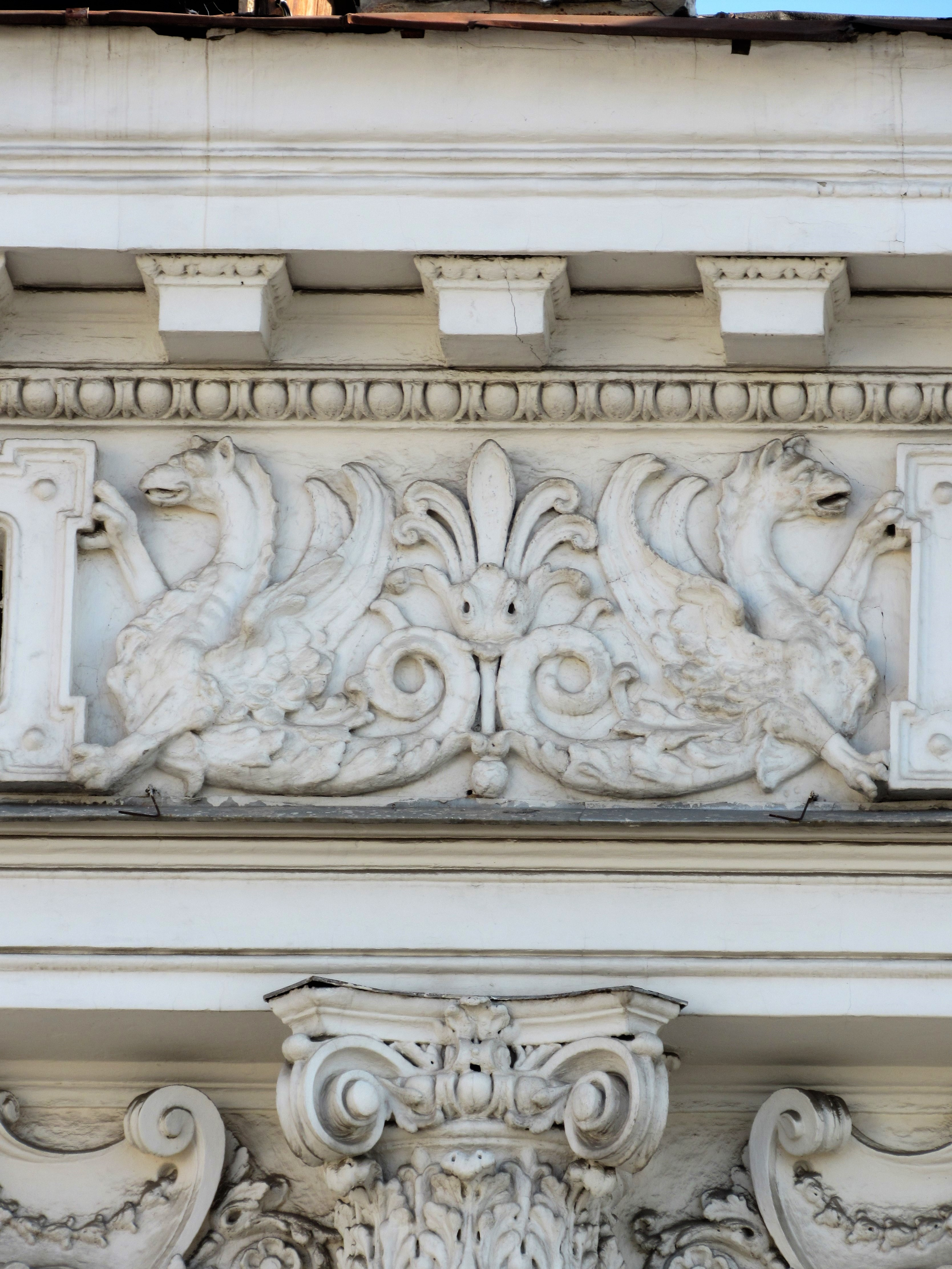
Bas-relief with dragons

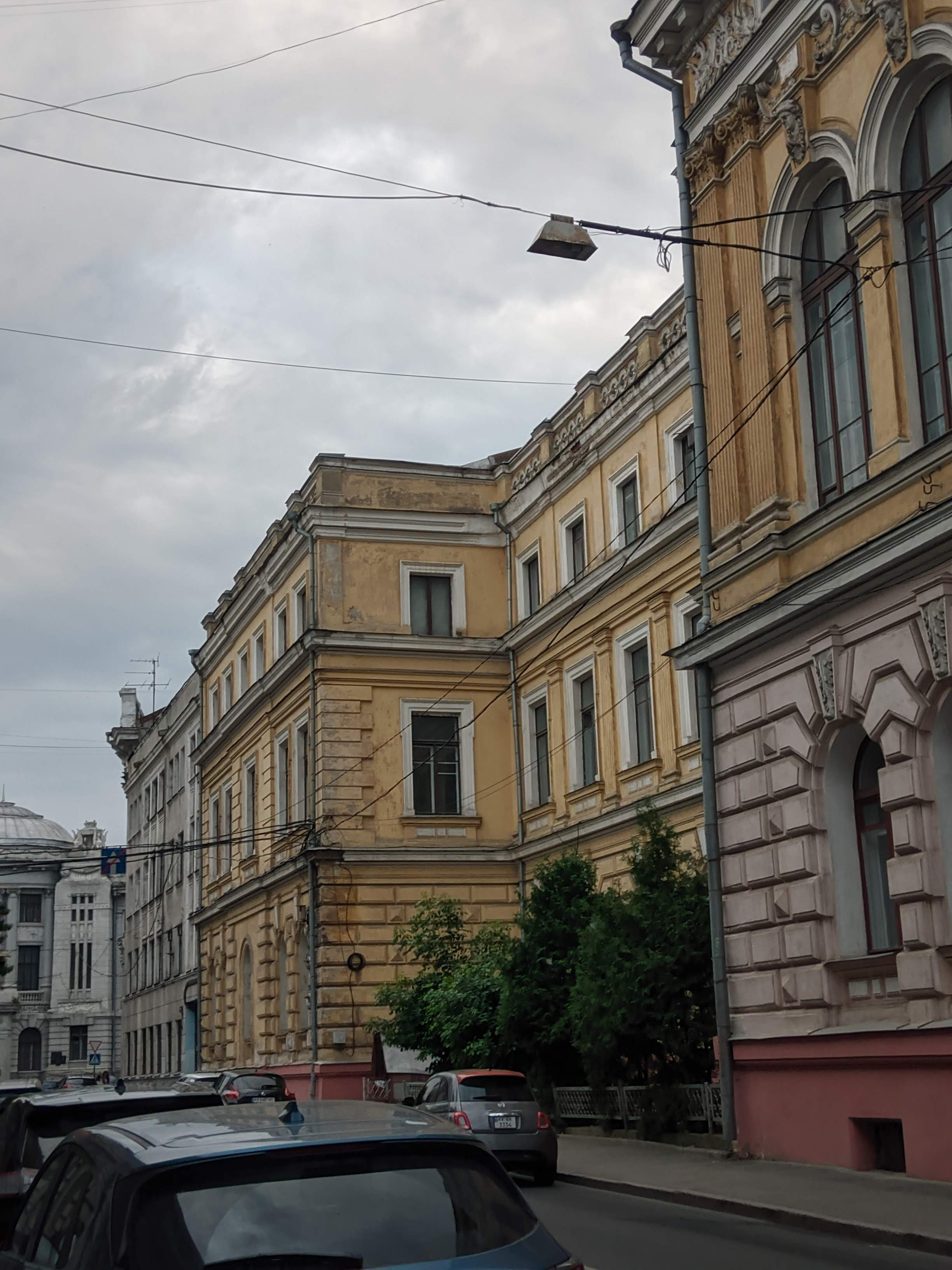
Side facade

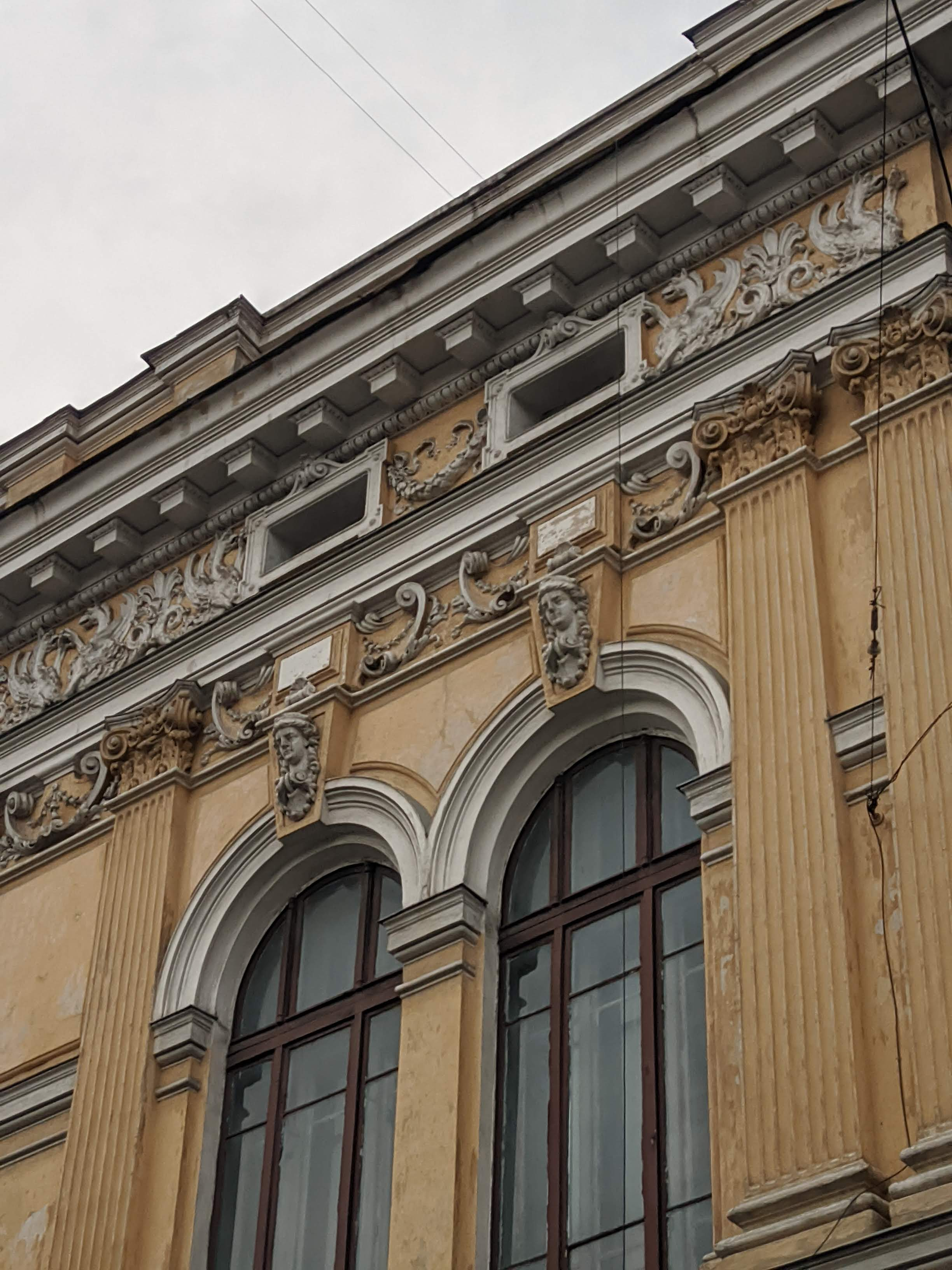
Side facade details

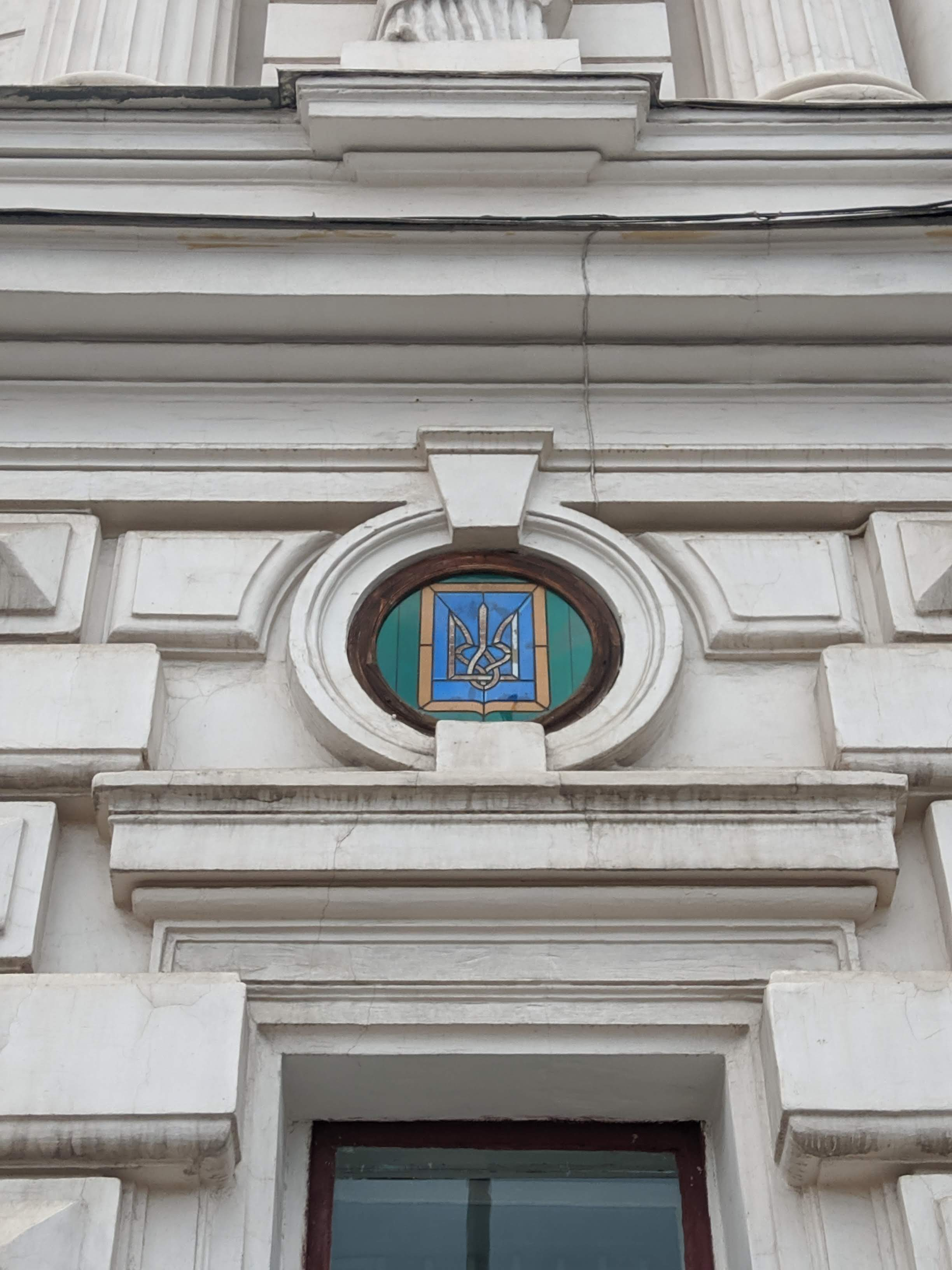
Stained glass window with the coat of arms of Ukraine

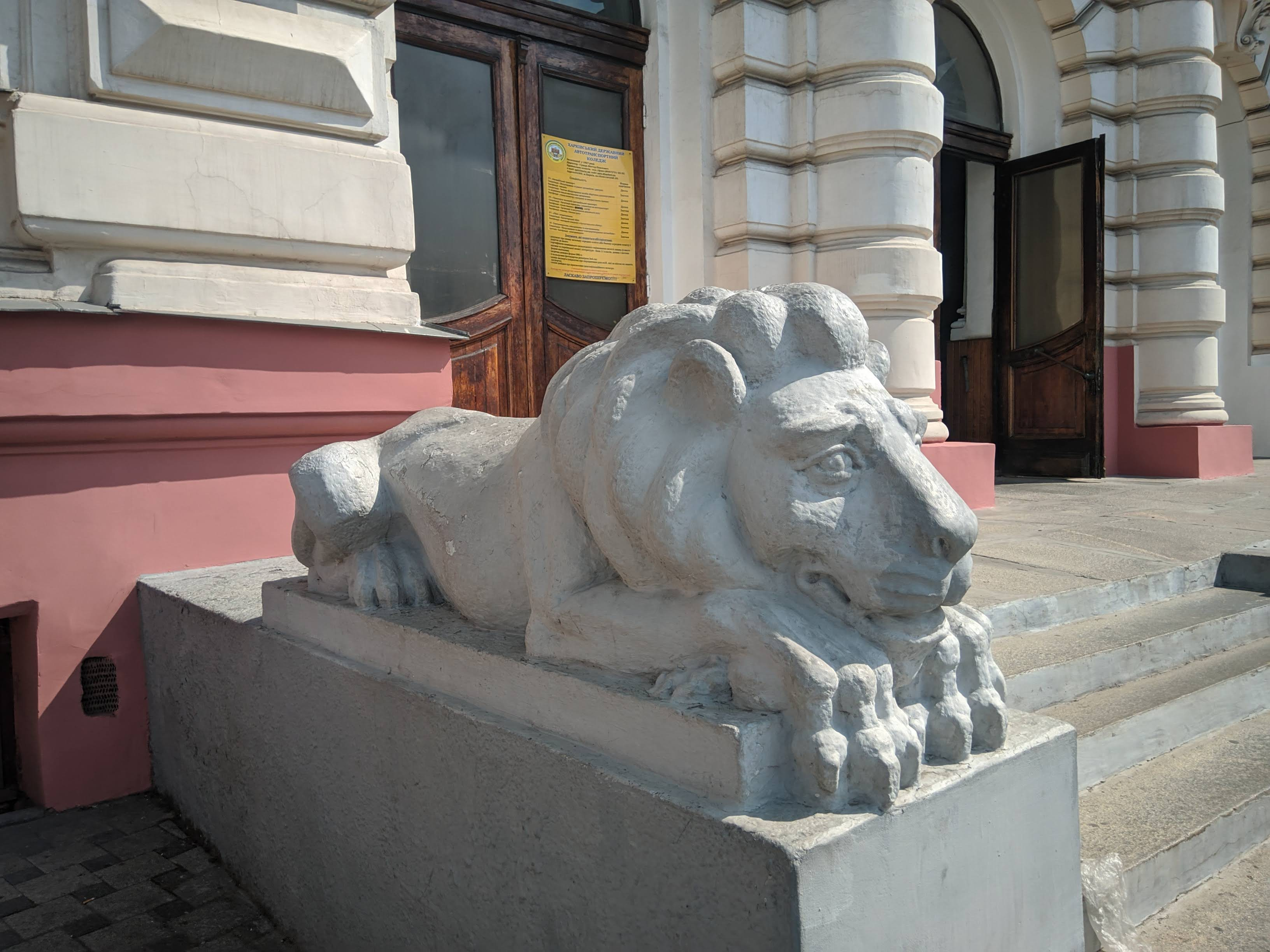
One of the lions

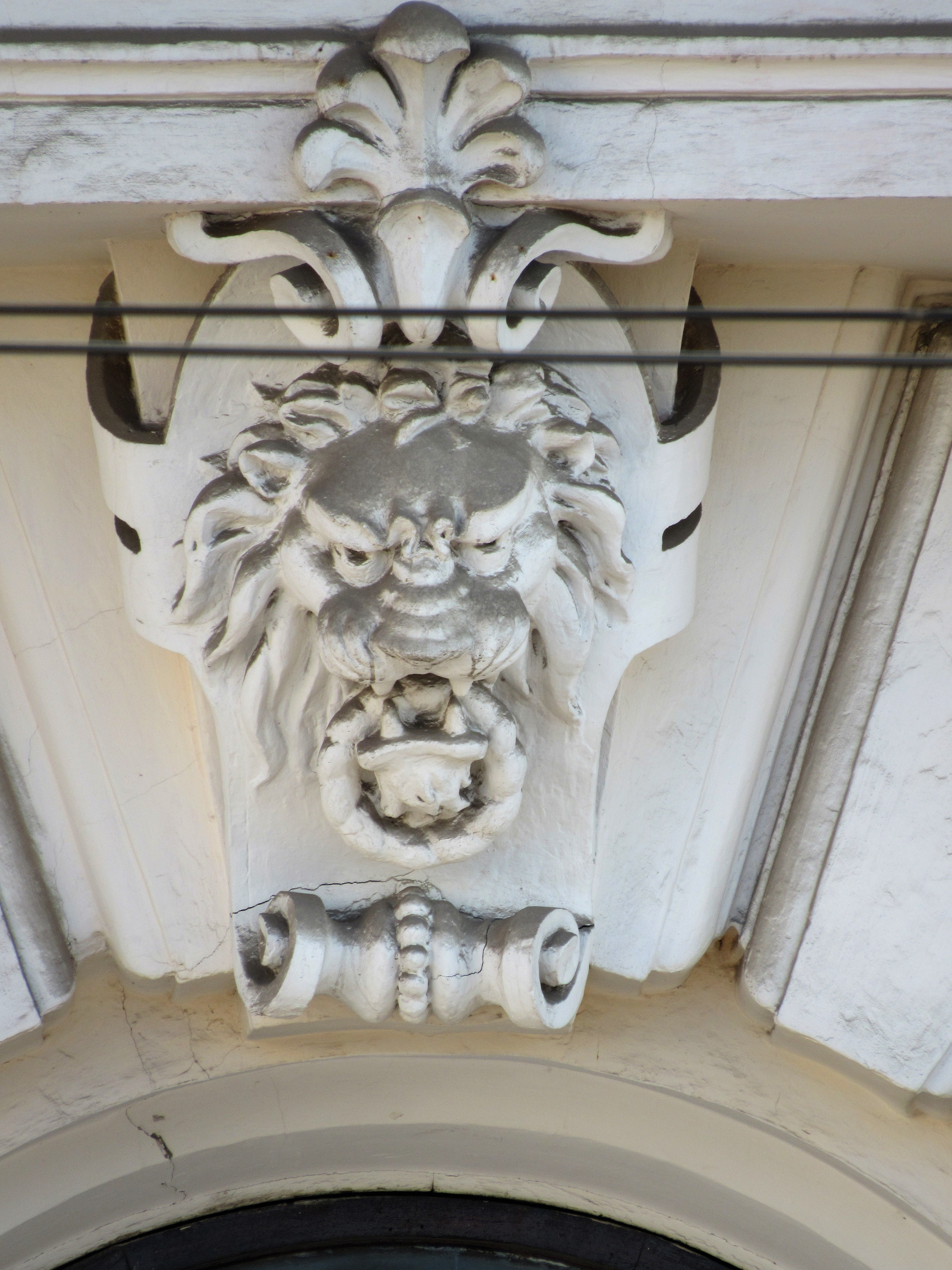
Lion on a building

== See also ==
- Oleksiy Alchevsky
- Oleksiy Beketov
- Kharkiv Automobile Transport Professional College
