= Khrystyna Alchevska =

Russian teacher and pedagogue

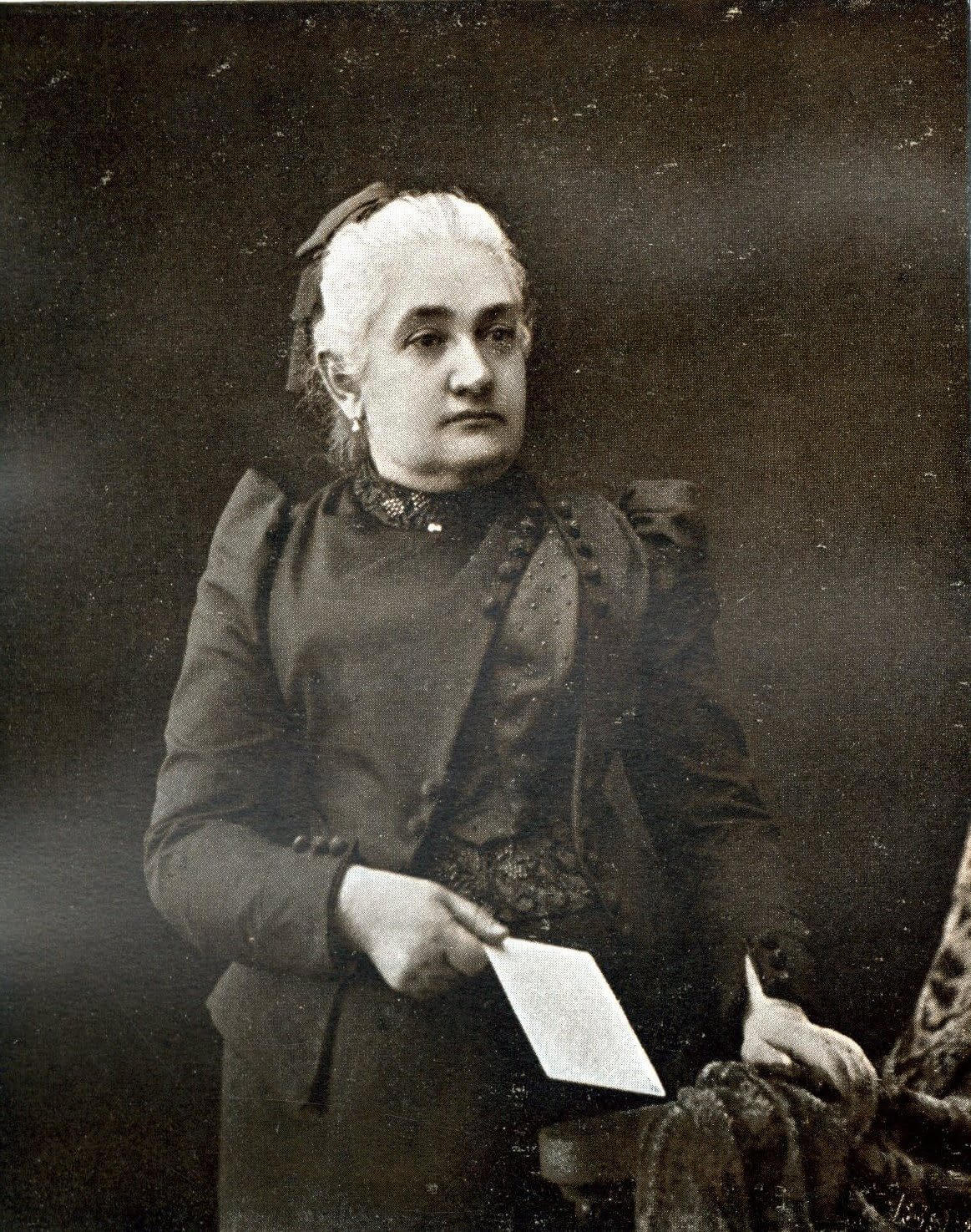
Khrystyna Alchevska, 1892

Khrystyna Danylivna Alchevska (Ukrainian: Христина Данилівна Алчевська; born Zhuravlova) (1841–1920) was Ukrainian pedagogue, organiser of public education, philanthropist, writer. Founder of the Kharkiv Women's Sunday School, which served as a model for adult education in Russian Empire and was praised in the West. In 1889, she was elected vice-president of the International League of Education in Paris.

== Biography ==
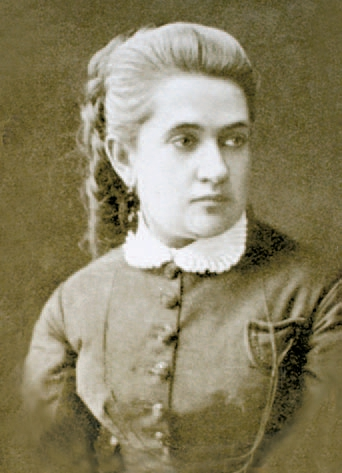

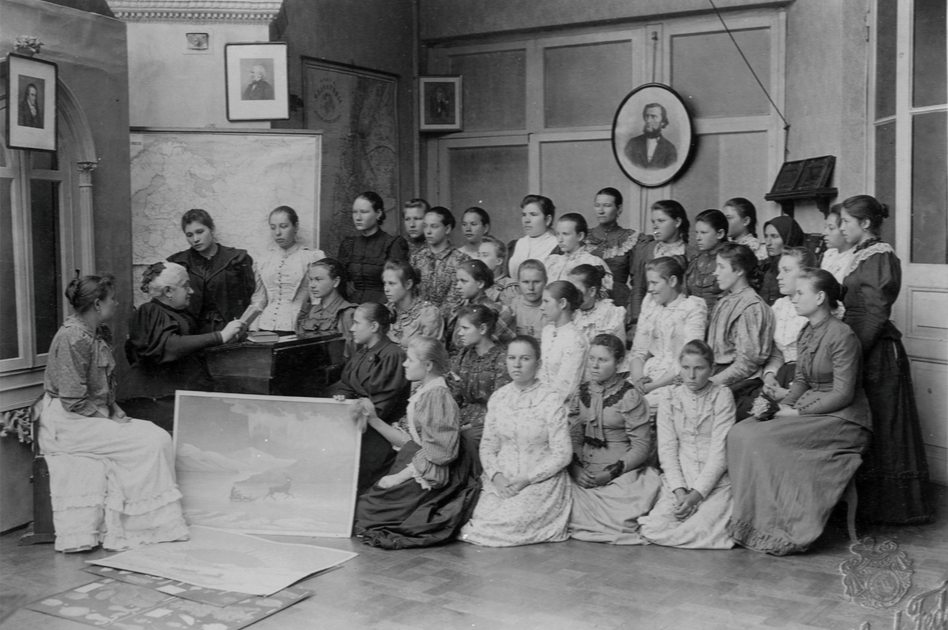
Photo of Alfred Fedetsky

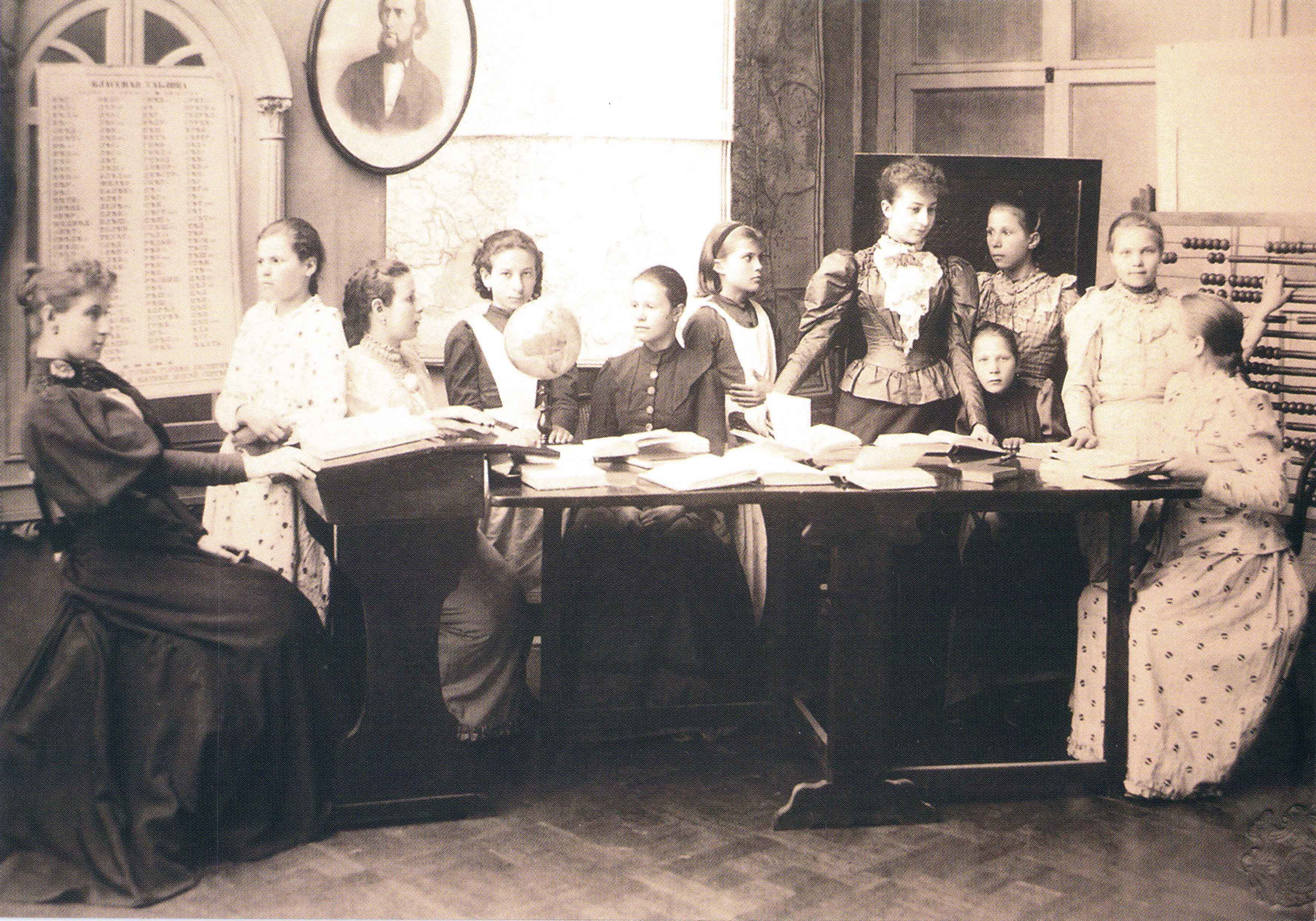
Alchevsky's Sunday school by Alfred Fedetsky (1900)

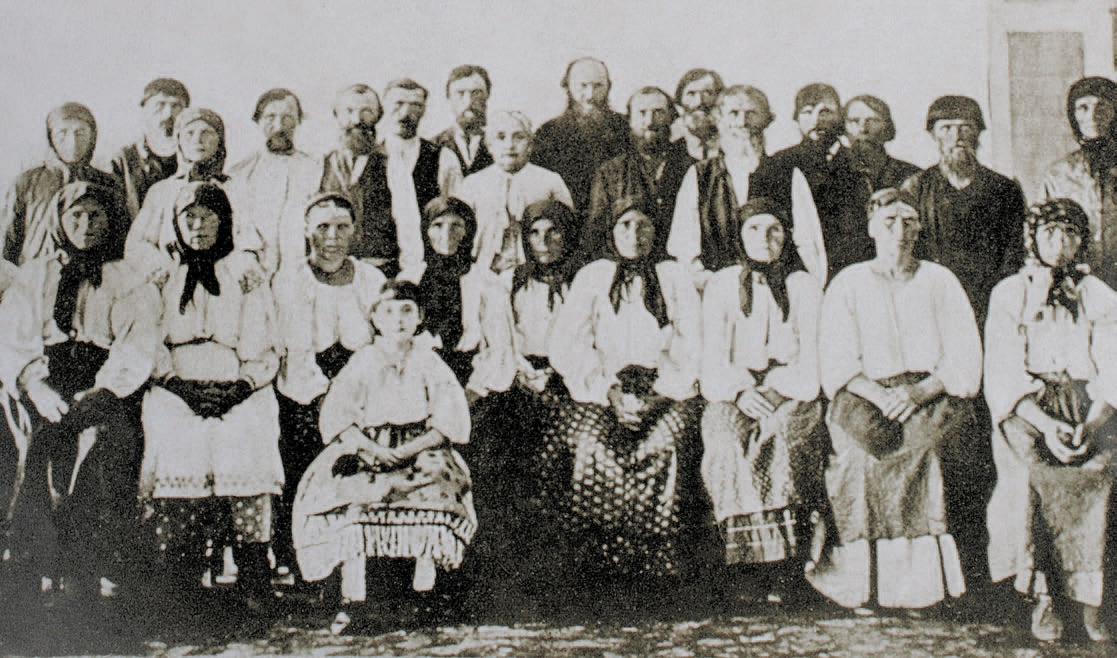
Alchevska with peasants in village of Alekseevka, Mikhaylovskaya volost, Slavyanoserbsk county (uyezd)

Khrystyna was born 16 April 1841 in Borzna, Chernigov Governorate, Russian Empire. She was born in the family of a district teacher of Russian literature Danila Zhuravlyov (1809–?) from a marriage with a noblewoman Annette Nikolaevna Vuich (1809–1857), the daughter of General Vujic.

Khrystyna married Oleksii Alchevskyi, a Ukrainian businessman, later owner of a large mine and steel plant, co-founder of Kharkiv Hromada. Their children numbered many talented and accomplished artists. Son, Ivan Alchevskyi, was a renowned opera singer. Daughter, Khrystia Alchevska, was a poet. Son, Hryhorii Alchevsky, was a composer.

She lived and worked in Kharkiv where died on 15 August 1920. Her gravestone bears the inscription ‘Enlightener of the People.’

== Professional life ==
Beginning in 1862, she established the Kharkiv Women's Sunday School (officially accredited in 1870) at her own expense. At the school, over 100 teachers taught law, geography, Ukrainian history, writing, mathematics, physics, and chemistry free of charge. In the early years, the school had about 50 students. In 1892-93, the number of students increased to 600-700. The number of teachers also grew: there was one teacher for every five students. The students were divided into three categories: those who could not write at all, those who could read but could not write, and those who needed to improve their skills. Each group had one or two supervisors who were also involved in extracurricular activities: students went on excursions, attended theatres and performances, and participated in literary readings. In 1896, Alchevska built a school building costing 50,000 karbovanets – the only building owned by the school among all Sunday schools in the Russian Empire. Her school was liquidated by the Soviet regime in 1919.

In 1879, she opened another school in the village of Oleksiivka (now part of the Perevalskyi district of Luhansk region), where lessons were conducted in Ukrainian. Borys Hrinchenko taught at the school.

In 1889, she attended the Paris Exhibition as the representative of Russian Empire teachers of adult students. She taught classes in Ukrainian until forced by the government to switch to Russian.

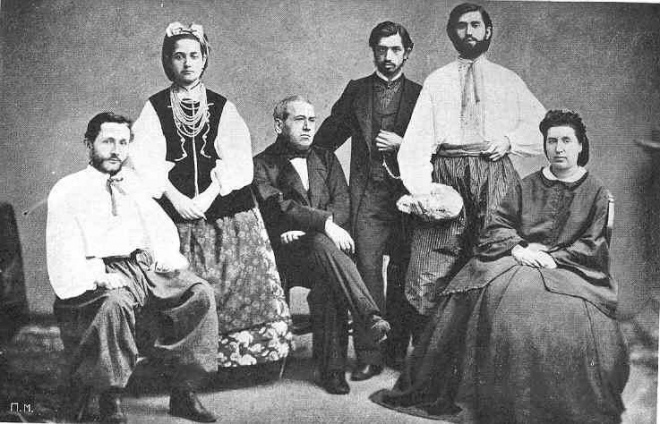
Khrystyna Alchevska (standing) and Oleksii Alchevskyi (seated on the left) in Ukrainian folk costumes. 1860s.

Alchevska compiled an award-winning methodological and bibliographical guide, What the People Should Read, (Chto chitat’ narodu) in 1906. This work earned the grand prize at the Paris International Exhibition, and a teaching manual, Book for Adults (Kniga vzroslykh) in 1900. She also wrote a memoir, My Thoughts and Experiences (Peredumannoe i perezhitoe), in 1912. She also published several methodological articles on adult education. In the 1860s, Alchevska's articles appeared in Aleksandr Herzen's journal Kolokol, under the pseudonym Ukrainka. Alchevska encouraged girls and women to dress in traditional regional costumes at community festivals and to perform folksongs. She wore peasant costume as a symbol of her dedication to the people she taught. She popularised the Ukrainian language, folk songs, and the works of Taras Shevchenko. In 1900, she erected Ukraine's first monument to Taras Shevchenko on her estate in Kharkiv. Her adaptation of Ukrainian folk culture and folk art helped peasants adjust to city life.

== Works ==
- Алчевская Х. Д. О первой книге для классного чтения взрослых М., 1895.
- Алчевская Х. Д. Передуманное и пережитое: дневники, письма, воспоминания. М., 1912.
- Алчевская Х. Д. Что читать народу? Критич. указатель книг для нар. и дет. чтения. В трёх томах. СПб., 1884–1906.

== Legacy ==
- There are streets named after Khrystyna Alchevska in various Ukrainian cities: Dnipro, Kryvyi Rih, Kremenchuk, Lviv, and Chernihiv.
- There is a lane named after Khrystyna Alchevska in the city of Kyiv.
- One of the streets in the city of Kramatorsk, Ukraine is named after the Alchevskyi family.
- The Borzna Secondary School I-III in Chernihiv region is named after Alchevska.
- Alchevska Specialised School No. 1 in Luhansk region is named after Alchevska.
- One of the units of the Plast organisation is named after Khrystyna Alchevska.
- In 1963, O. Mazurkevych published a book on the educational work of Alchevska and her colleagues.
