= Gregory Alchevsky =

Russian/Ukrainian composer

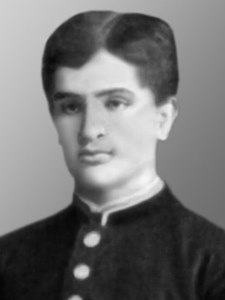
- Gregory Alchevsky in 1920
- Born: 1866; Kharkiv, Russian Empire
- Died: 1920 (aged 53–54); Moscow
- Occupation: Composer
- Parents: Aleksey Alchevsky (father); Khrystyna Alchevska (mother)

Gregory Alchevsky (Note: Russian: Григо́рий Алексе́евич Алче́вский, Ukrainian: Григорій Олексійови Алчевський; Alchevsky's first name is sometimes written as Hryhorii, or Grigory.) (Ukrainian: Алчевський Григорій Олексійович; 1866–1920) was a Ukrainian composer. Alchevsky was born in Kharkiv, Ukraine, then in the Russian Empire, the son of the wealthy industrialist and banker Aleksey Alchevsky, and his wife Khrystyna Alchevska, a teacher who was a prominent activist for national education in Imperial Russia. Their six children were all musically gifted.

Alchevsky graduated from the Faculty of Physics and Mathematics of Kharkiv University in 1887 and went on to study at the Moscow Imperial Conservatory. He was the friend of several Russian composers, including Sergei Rachmaninov, Alexander Scriabin and Aleksandr Goldenweiser. Alchevsky was a late Romantic movement composer. His most popular works were romances and settings of folk songs, which perpetuated the use of Ukrainian folk music into the 20th century. He worked as a music teacher and a singer, activities which acted to limit his output as a composer. He wrote a symphonic poem, Alyosha Popovych, while his work Breathing Tables for Singers and their Application to the Development of the Basic Qualities of the Voice, first published in 1908, remains in print.

== Biography ==
=== Family ===
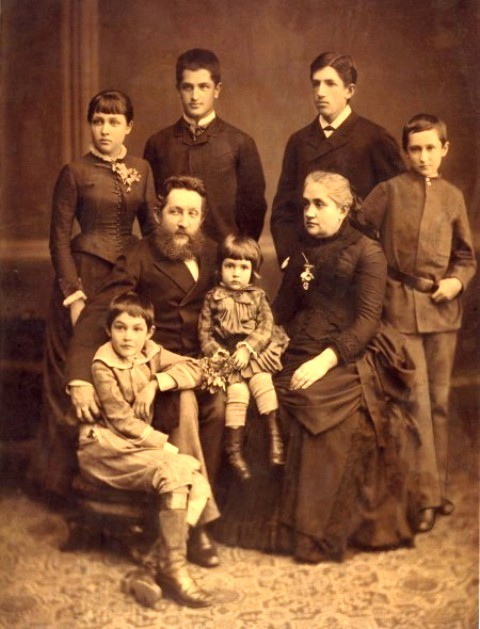
The Alchevsky family in the 1880s. Gregory is standing third on the left.

Gregory Oleksiiovych Alchevsky was born in 1866 in Kharkiv (then in Sloboda Ukraine in the Russian Empire, now in modern Ukraine). He was the son of a mining engineer, industrialist and banker Aleksey Alchevsky. Gregory's mother Khrystyna Alchevska (née Zhuravleva), was the daughter of a teacher, and was herself a teacher.

There was an artistic atmosphere within the Alchevsky house. Ostap Lysenko, son of the Ukrainian composer Mykola Lysenko, once said: "to visit the salon of the Alchevskys is the same as a visit to the theatre" and observed that "the cream of the Russian Empire's intelligentsia gathered there", including pianist and composer Sergei Rachmaninov during his visits to Kharkiv.

Gregory Alchevsky had five siblings—all six children were musically gifted. Their first music teacher was Lyubov Karpova, whom the family respected highly. Gregory's younger brother Ivan Alchevsky became an opera singer, an orchestral conductor, and a pianist. In later life, the two brothers remained strong friends, and Ivan sang a tenor solo at his brother's wedding. Alchevsky spent summers with his family at their dacha at Kekeneiz on the southern coast of the Crimea.

=== Education ===
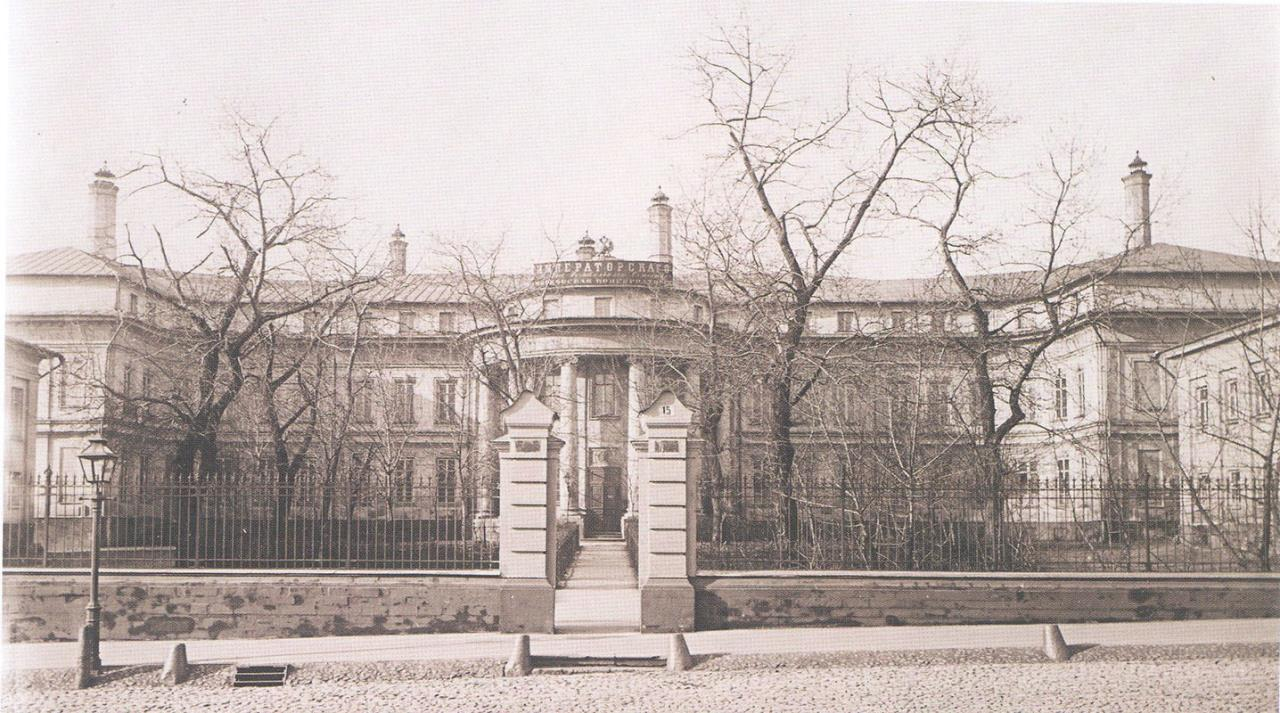
The Moscow Imperial Conservatory in the 1890s

Gregory had outstanding musical abilities from a young age. In 1887, he completed his studies at the Faculty of Physics and Mathematics of Kharkiv University but went on to study at the Moscow Imperial Conservatory, where he studied counterpoint and composition with Sergei Taneyev. He was taught instrumentation by the composer Mikhail Ippolitov-Ivanov. He studied in Rachmaninov's composition and singing classes at the Conservatory; they became good friends. He studied harmony under Anton Arensky.

Even when at the Conservatory, Alchevsky's compositions were noticed by the musical community. His friend Goldenweiser wrote of his fellow student as being "three heads above everyone else in terms of talent and instinct". According to Goldenweiser, his friend left the conservatory a month before graduating.

=== Career ===
Alchevsky became increasingly well known in Russian musical circles. He was on friendly terms with Russian cultural figures such as the composer pianists Alexander Scriabin and Aleksandr Goldenweiser. His connections helped to popularise Ukrainian music. In Kharkiv, Alchevsky organized a balalaika orchestra and several amateur string orchestras.

Alchevsky's students included the singers Dmitry Aspelund, Nicholai Ozerov, and Sergei Yudin. He was also his younger brother Ivan's first vocal teacher.

Alchevsky's late Romantic movement compositions have a tendency towards Slavic-Ukrainian folk music. His most popular works were his settings of folk songs and his two cycles of romances, which were published privately in Moscow by the Kharkiv-born singer Mikhail Slonov. In 1910, Grigory and Ivan Alchevsky created the Ukrainian musical and dramatic society "Kobzar" in Moscow. They and other artists wrote about and performed Russian and Ukrainian works. That year, Alchevsky was living in Moscow with his wife Maria Mykolaivna. They occupied a first-floor apartment in Bogoslovsky Lane (between Bolshaya Dmitrovka Street and Petrovka Street), and his brother Ivan at one time lived on the third floor of the same building. Alchevsky died in Moscow in 1920.

== Compositions ==
Alchevsky's musical compositions include a symphonic poem, his folk song arrangements, and his music set to the words of Taras Shevchenko, Ivan Franko, Lesya Ukrainka, Apollon Maykov and Mikhail Lermontov. His work as a teacher reduced his output as a composer.

Alchevsky made a notable contribution to Ukrainian music. His romances perpetuated the use of traditional Ukrainian folk songs in classical music, although his settings of Russian texts, such as "Sosna" by Lermontov, "I long stood motionless" by Afanasy Fet, and "I know what father has on these shores" by Maykov, more noticeably show the influence of Russian composers, in particular Pyotr Ilyich Tchaikovsky and Taneyev.

=== Alyosha Popovych ===
In 1904, Ilya Slatin conducted the premiere of Alchevsky's symphonic poem Alyosha Popovych in Kharkiv. The composition shows the influence of Rachmaninoff. Western European romanticism influenced the classical music produced by Ukrainian composers, who similarly adopted historical, oriental, and fairy-tale themes. Ukrainians were attracted to the heroic tales of Kyivan Rus, as with the Ukrainian composer Vladimir Sokalsky's overture Red Sun, the Russian-Varangian Overture by the Ukrainian composer Mykola Tutkovskyi, as well Alchevsky's Alyosha Popovych. According to one review written not long after the piece was performed, it displayed "bold, original talent, melodic gift, a lot of imagination, clarity of musical speech and brilliant instrumentation technique".

=== Symphony (first movement) ===
Alchevsky began to write a symphony, but it was never completed. He and Goldenweiser visited Rachmaninoff, who had a professional interest in the young composers. When Alchevsky showed Rachmaninoff the sketches of the first movement of his symphony, Rachmaninoff played it through and praised it. Over a year later, Rachmaninoff remembered the music and asked about it. When Alchevsky told him that only the first part was done, Rachmaninoff played an exposition of the piece without the use of a score.

=== Romances ===
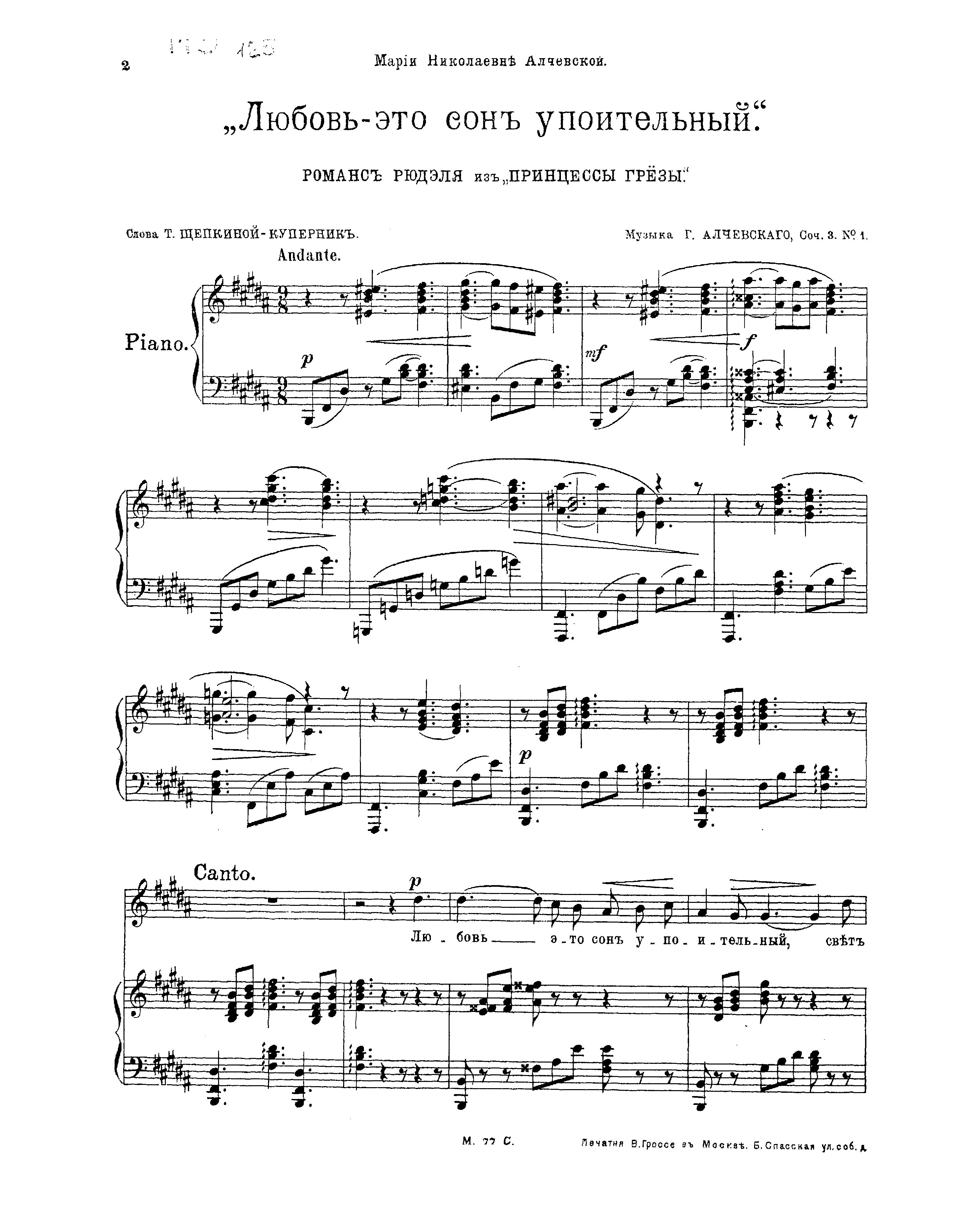
The first page of Alchensky's Romance Ор. 3 No. 1 (1905)

Alchevsky's romances were written for solo voice with piano:

- Opus 3. Romances for voice with piano with words by Maria Alchevska and others:

- No. 1. "Любовь – это сон упоительный", Романс Рюделя из "Принцессы Грёзы" Ростана ("Love is an intoxicating dream", Rudel's romance from «La Princesse Lointaine» by Rostand), words by Tatyana Shchepkina-Kupernik;
- No. 2."Раб" ("Slave"), words by Olga Chyumina;
- No. 3. "Песня Лунного луча" ("Song of the Moonbeam"), words by Konstantin Sluchevsky;
- No. 4. "Я знаю, отчего" ("I know why"), words by Apollon Maykov;
- No. 5: "Сосна" ("Pine"), words by Mikhail Lermontov;
- No. 6. "Ах, как у нас хорошо на балконе" ("Oh, how nice it is on our balcony"), words by Yakov Polonsky.

- Opus 4. Romances for voice with piano with words by Khrystyna Alchevska and others:

- No. 1. "Чого мені тяжко" ("Why is it hard for me"), words by Taras Shevchenko
- No. 2. "Літньої ночі" ("Summer night"), words by T. Shevchenko;
- No. 3. "Не дивися на місяць весною" ("Don't look at the moon in spring"), words by Khrystia Alchevska;
- No. 4. "Душа – се конвалія ніжна" ("The soul is a gentle lily of the valley"), words by K. Alchevska;
- No. 5. "Стояла я і слухала весну" ("I stood and listened to the spring"), words by Lesya Ukrainka;
- No. 6. "Безмежнеє поле" ("Boundless Field"), words by Ivan Franko.

=== Other works ===
- "Sanctus Dominus" for 5-voice choir and organ;
- Two fugues for strings.

== Publications ==
Alchevsky's methodological teaching aids Vocal Technique in Daily Exercises (1907, Moscow) and Breathing Tables for Singers and their Application to the Development of the Basic Qualities of the Voice (1908, 1928, 1930, Moscow) have been used by musicians for over a hundred years.

Another work by Alchevsky, The most important wishes regarding voice education and conclusions from them, has not been studied.

- Вокальная техника в ежедневных упражнениях (Vocal Technique in Daily Exercises) (1907);
- Таблицы Дыхания Для Певцов И Их Применение К Развитию Основных Качеств Голоса (Breathing Tables for Singers and their Application to the Development of the Basic Qualities of the Voice) (1908, republished in 1928 and 1930).

== Commemoration ==
The 2015 HUP International Festival ("S. Rachmaninov and Ukrainian Culture") in Kharkiv commemorated Alchevsky's 150th anniversary as part of its celebrations.

== Sources ==
- Dytyniak, Maria (1986). Українські композитори [Ukrainian Composers]. Edmonton, Canada: Canadian Institute of Ukrainian Studies, University of Alberta.
- Hordiychuk, M. M., ed. (1990). History of Ukrainian Music (in Ukrainian). Vol. 6. Kyiv: Academy of Sciences of the Ukrainian SSR.
- Ivanovskyi, P. O. (2001). "Алчевський Григорій Олексійович" [Alchevsky Hryhoriy Oleksiiovych]. In Dzyuba, I. M.; Zhukovsky, A. I.; Zheleznyak, M. G. (eds.). Encyclopedia of Modern Ukraine (in Ukrainian). Vol. 1. Institute of Encyclopedic Research of the National Academy of Sciences of Ukraine. ISBN 9789660220744.
- Lysenko, Ivan; Myoslavskyi, Kyril (1980). Іван Алчевський: Спогади, Матеріали, Листування [Ivan Alchevskyi: Memoirs, Materials, Correspondence] (PDF) (in Russian). Kyiv: Music Ukraine. OCLC 7554384.
- Nikolaeva, A.; Scriabin, Alexander (2015). "Наш Старик". Александр Гольденвейзер и Московская консерватория ["Our Old Man." Alexander Goldenweiser and the Moscow Conservatory] (in Russian). Moscow; Saint Petersburg: LitRes. ISBN 978-50400-6-169-3.

=== Published works ===
- Alchevsky, Gregory (2014) [1908]. Таблицы дыхания для певцов и их применение к развитию основных качеств голоса: Учебное пособие [Breathing Tables for Singers and their Application to the Development of Basic Voice Qualities] (PDF) (in Russian) (2nd ed.). Планета музыки [Planet of Music]. ISBN 978-5-91938-168-6.
