= Aleksey Alchevsky =

Ukrainian entrepreneur, philanthropist, and industrialist

Oleksii Alchevskyi
- Олексій Алчевський
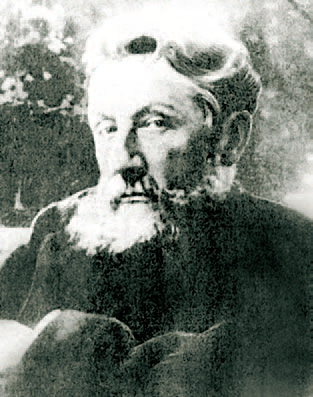
- Born: 1835; Sumy, Sloboda Ukraine Governorate, Russian Empire
- Died: 1901 (aged 65–66); Saint Petersburg, Russian Empire
- Occupations: Entrepreneur, philanthropist

Aleksey Kirillovich Alchevsky (Russian: Алексей Кириллович Алчевский; Ukrainian: Олексій Кирилович Алчевський, romanized: Oleksii Kyrylovych Alchevskyi; 1835 – 1901) was Russian entrepreneur, philanthropist, and industrialist of Ukrainian ancestry. He established the first financial group in Imperial Russia and created several banks and industrial societies in Sloboda Ukraine. His role in the development of Russian industry was so important that in 1903 the Yuryevka station of the Yekaterinoslav Railway was renamed to Alchevsk in his honor, later developing into a buoyant town.

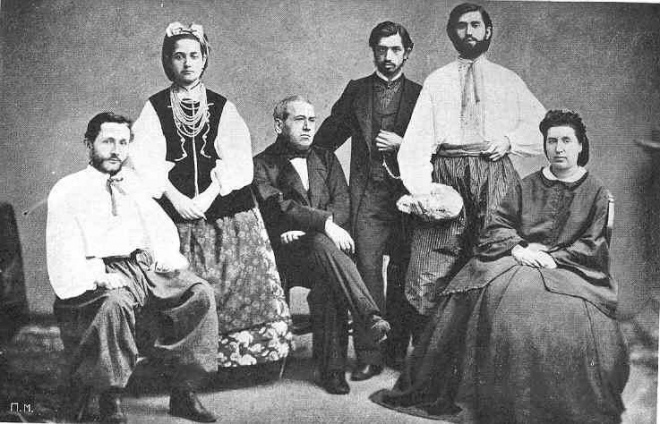
Oleksii Alchevskyi (seated on the left) and Khrystyna Alchevska (standing) in Ukrainian folk costumes. 1860s

== Biography ==
Born in Sumy, Kharkov Governorate (Sloboda Ukraine) in a family of small grocery merchant of Cossacks ancestry, Alchevsky graduated from the Sumy County School and in 1862 moved to Kharkov. During his young age, he was interested in left populist ideas, the poetry of Taras Shevchenko, and belonged to the Hromada movement. While keeping own tea store, Alchevsky continued self-education.

During the so-called banking fever in Russia at the end of 1860s and beginning of 1870s, Alchevsky became initiator in creating the Kharkov Mutual Society (1866). Later in 1868, as a merchant of the 2nd Guild, he became one of the founders of the Kharkov Trade Bank with principal capital of 500,000 rubles, becoming the third commerce bank in Russia after the Saint Petersburg Private Commerce Bank and the Moscow Merchant Bank. In 1871 Alchevsky, as a merchant of the 1st Guild, became one of founders (along with Ivan Vernadskyi, the father of Vladimir Vernadsky) of the first mortgage lending bank in the country, the Kharkov Land Bank, with principal capital of 1,000,000 rubles. Alchevskyi was the chairman of the bank until his death in 1901.

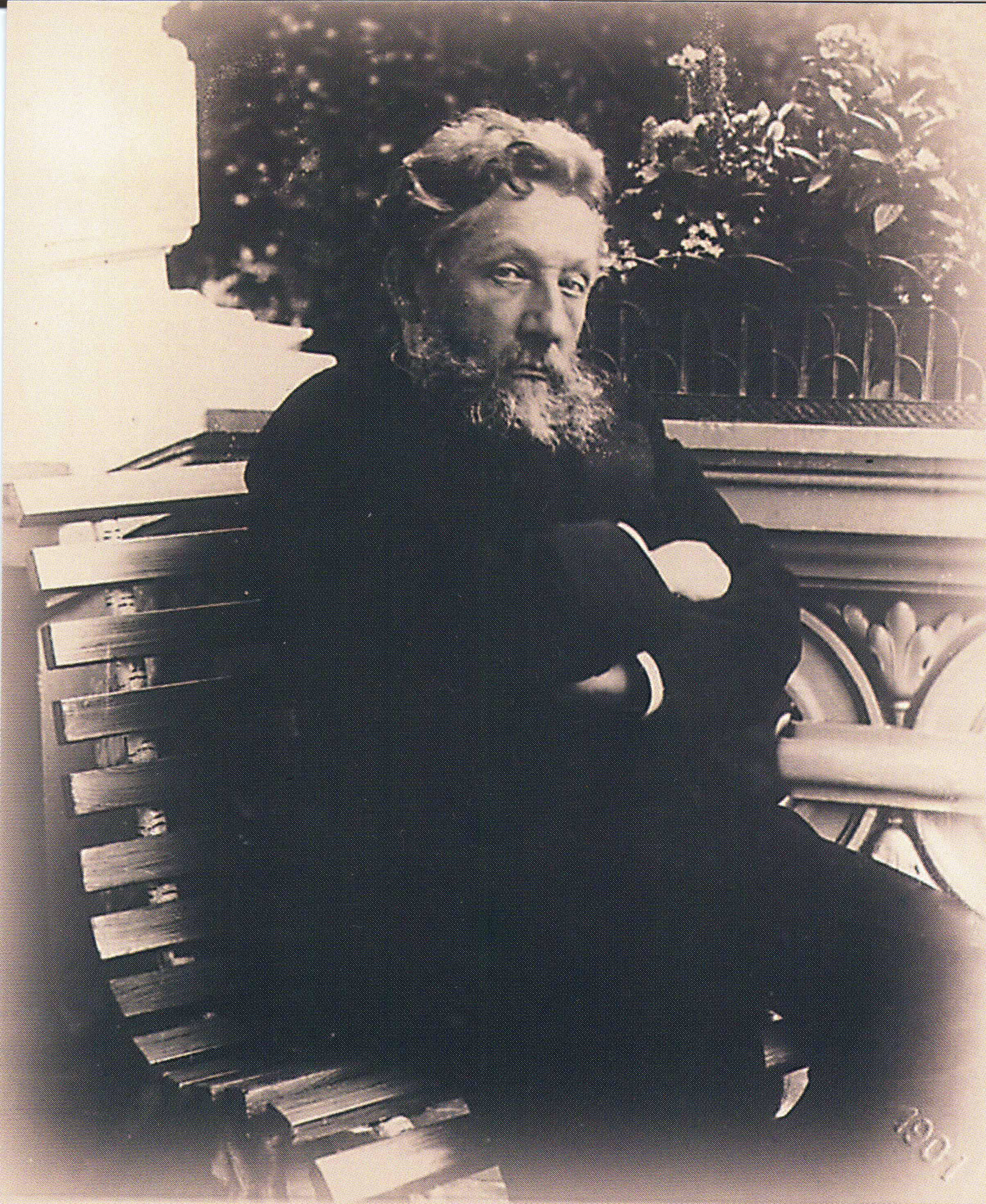
Photo of Aleksey Alchevsky in Kharkov, 1901 by Alfred Fedetsky

In 1879 Alchevsky established the Alekseyevskoye Mining Society (principal capital 2,000,000 rubles) that possessed the richest deposits of anthracite coal in Slavyanoserbsk uezd. In 1900 the company extracted some 45 million poods of coal, becoming the third company in the Donbass region by volume of extracted coal. Alchevsky also initiated the construction of the metallurgical factories of the Donets-Yuryevka Metallurgical Society (1895, principal capital 8 million rubles) near train station Yuryevka (today Komunarsk train station in Alchevsk, Alchevsk Metallurgical Complex) and of the Russian Providence (Russkii Providans) joint-stock company near Mariupol (today part of Illich Steel and Iron Works). By 1900 his fortune neared 30 million rubles.

In 1899 along with his wife Khrystyna Zhuravlyova he built the first monument to Taras Shevchenko, however due to the anti-Ukrainian Russian policy the monument-bust was established at a backyard of their personal mansion (built by Alexei Beketov) in Kharkov. The monument was made out of white marble by the Russian sculptor Vladimir Beklemishev. After the death of Aleksey Alchevsky, the mansion was sold and the monument removed by authorities, eventually ending up in the Taras Shevchenko National Museum in Kyiv. Churches, hospitals, libraries, and Sunday schools were built in Sumy at his expense. Given his funding of Ukrainian national initiatives, it is said that Alchevsky's wife called him a ‘fanatical Ukrainian’.

After failing to obtain financial help from the Ministry of Finance during the 1899-1902 economic crisis, Alchevsky jumped under a train on 20 May 1901 at the Tsarskoselsky railway station in Saint Petersburg.

== Family ==
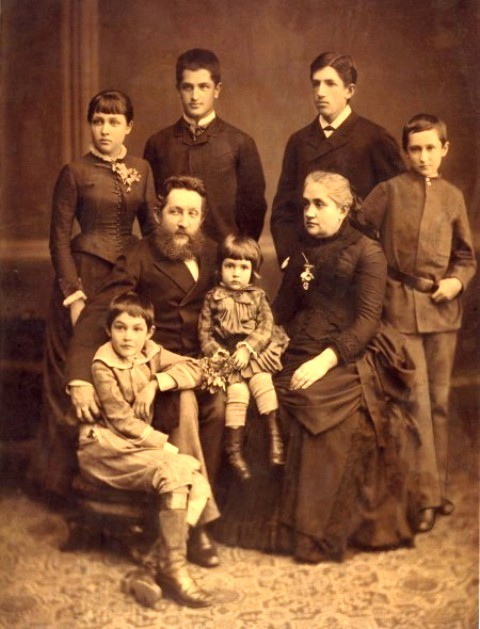
Alchevsky family

Alchevskyi was married to an educator and pedagogue Khrystyna Zhuravlyova. They had six children.

- Grigory Alchevsky, a composer
- Khrystia Alchevska
- Ivan Alchevskyi
- Anna Alchevskaya
- Dmitry Alchevsky, a victim of Red Terror in Crimea
- Nikolay Alchevsky

== Legacy ==
In 1903, after a petition by Russian industrialists, the Yuryevka train station and the workers settlement next to it were renamed into Alchevskoe (today the city of Alchevsk) in his honour. There are monuments to him in the main square of Alchevsk city as well as in Kharkiv.

In 2005, the National Bank of Ukraine issued a hryvnia coin from the series “Outstanding Personalities of Ukraine,” dedicated to the 170th anniversary of Alchevsky's birth.

There is a street named after Alchevsky in the city of Kamianske.

On 19 April 2023, one of the streets in the city of Kramatorsk was renamed after the Alchevsky family.
