= Alfred Fedetsky =

Russian photographer (1857–1902)

- Альфред Константинович Федецкий
- Born: 1857; Zhytomyr, Russian Empire (now in Ukraine)
- Died: 21 July 1902 (aged 44–45); Minsk, Russian Empire (now in Belarus)
- Other name: Alfred Fedecki
- Occupations: Photographer; filmmaker

Alfred Konstantinovich Fedetsky (Ukrainian: Альфред Костянтинович Федецький, Russian: Альфред Константинович Федецкий, 1857 — 21 July 1902) was a prominent Ukrainian photographer and filmmaker who worked in the Russian Empire. He authored numerous portraits of notable citizens (Ivan Aivazovsky, Pyotr Tchaikovsky, John of Kronstadt, among many others) as well as members of the Russian Imperial family. He was the personal photographer of Duchess Alexandra of Oldenburg.

== Life and education ==
Alfred Fedetsky was born in 1857 in Zhytomyr, Volyn Governorate (now Ukraine), into a family of Polish origin.

After graduating from the Imperial Photographic Institute at the Academy of Fine Arts Vienna, he moved to the Kiev Governorate in 1880. Six years later he moved once again, to Kharkiv. His teacher as well as his spiritual mentor was the photographer Włodzimierz Wysocki, a fellow Russian photographer of Polish origin who held the position of photographer of the Court of Her Imperial Highness Grand Duchess Alexandra.

On 21st of July 1902, while traveling for medical treatment, Alfred Fedetsky died in Minsk. On the 26th of July, he was buried in the Cemetery of the Beheading of St. John the Baptist, in Kharkiv, Ukraine (now City Cemetery № 13), in a family crypt next to his wife.

== Career ==
Fedetsky was also a pioneering cinematographer. He is credited with being the first Russian to shoot a film (the Belgian Camille Cerf preceded him by four months, filming the coronation of Czar Nicholas II at the Kremlin in May 1896) called The Religious Procession Carrying over the Miraculous Icon of the Virgin in the Kharkiv Kuryazh Monastery, on 20 September 1896.

From the late 1880s, Fedetsky experimented with the Edison phonograph. In 1896, he acquired a 60 mm Chronophotographe camera designed by Georges Demenÿ from Gaumont, apparently under a concession agreement, and began making films in Kharkiv. His early works also included The Fancy Riding of the First Orenburg Cossack Regiment, and a film depicting a train's departure from Kharkiv railway station. In early 1897, he also filmed Skating at Red Square, Kharkiv, and a public fête in the city.

Fedetsky's films premiered at the Kharkiv Opera House on 2 November 1896, in a programme combining his works with Gaumont productions. He subsequently toured Ukraine, organising public and charity screenings, and showed films at Kyiv's Bergonier Theatre in November 1897. Amid growing competition and apparent commercial difficulties, he seems to have ended his agreement with Gaumont and his filmmaking career in 1898.

The fate of his other films and his later life remain undocumented.
