= Sergei Yudin (tenor) =

Russian opera singer (1889–1963)

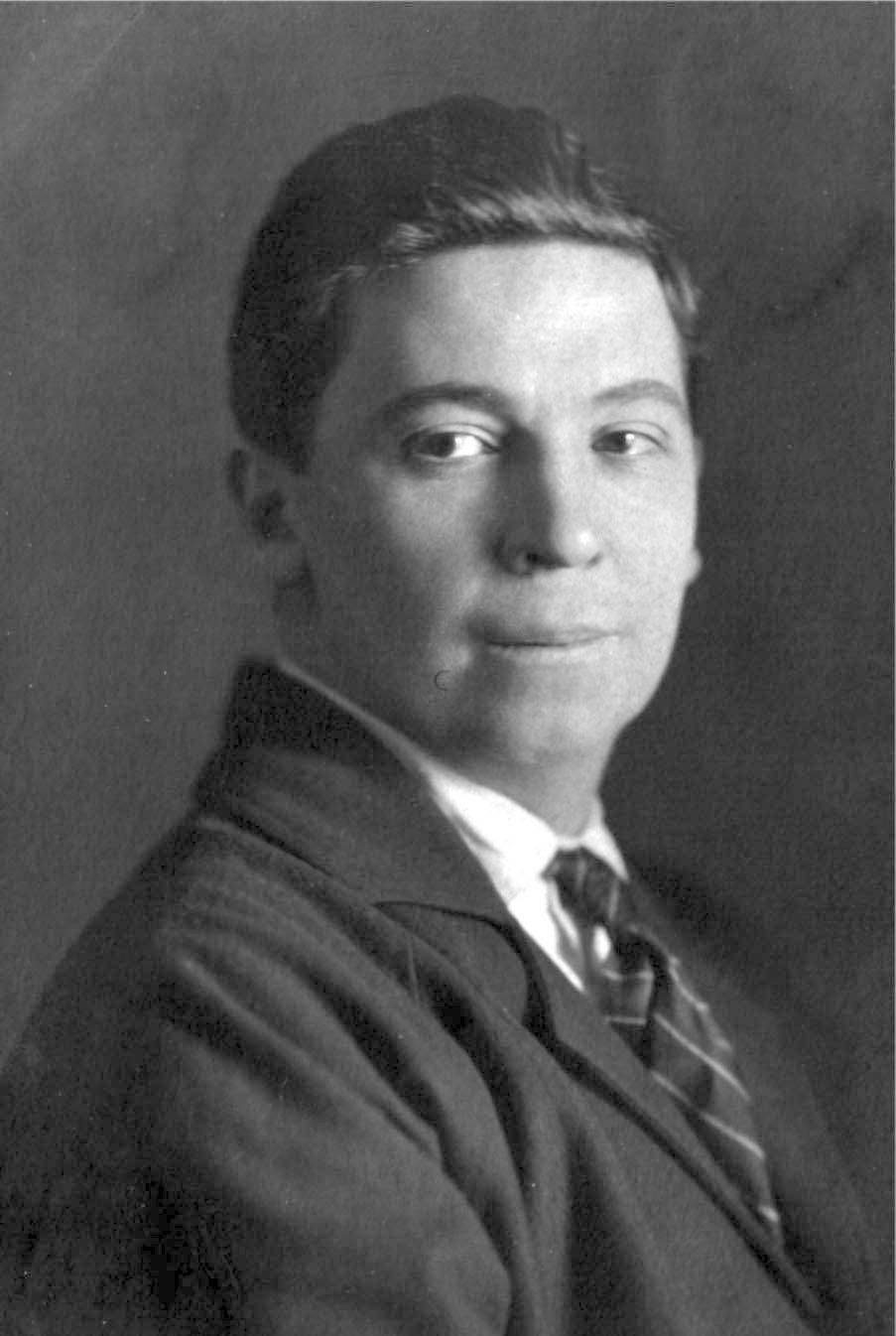
- Born: Sergei Petrovich Yudin; 8 July 1889; Moscow, Russian Empire
- Died: 5 May 1963 (aged 73); Moscow, USSR
- Occupation: Operatic singer
- Years active: 1910-1941

Sergei Petrovich Yudin (Russian: Сергей Петрович Юдин, 8 July [O.S. 26 June] 1889 – 5 May 1963) was a leading Russian operatic tenor with a lyric voice. Honored Artist of the Russian Federation in 1933.

== Biography ==
Sergei Petrovich Yudin was born on 8 July 1889 in Moscow to the family of an office employee. From early childhood he showed great artistic gifts and inclinations and studied in the School of Painting, Sculpture and Architecture where one of his teachers was Apollinary Vasnetsov. In 1900-1906 he studied in the Moscow Higher Technical School. Then he was carried away by the idea of being a singer and since 1906 he took lessons from Hryhory Alchevsky. Later he continues his musical education under Professor Alexander Dodonov.

In 1910 Yudin was invited for an audition in the Bolshoi Theatre during which he produced a most favorable impression on the commission members. On 14 February 1911 he made his debut in the Bolshoi in the part of Bayan in Ruslan and Lyudmila by Mikhail Glinka. His debut was a great success but by the decision of the management he was for some time engaged only in secondary roles: The Indian in Sadko by Nikolai Rimsky-Korsakov and Sinodal in The Demon by Anton Rubinstein. The main part in this production was performed by the famous baritone Georges Baklanoff.

His debut in the main role was the part of Lensky in Eugene Onegin by Pyotr Ilyich Tchaikovsky in 1913. His partners were M. Gukova (Tatiana) and I. Gryzunov (Onegin), the conductor being Emil Cooper.

The press published laudatory reviews. On 23 April 1913 the Season's News wrote: “For the first times, apart from Sobinov, we have heard one more veritable Lensky…”. Yudin was invited to sing this part in the Casino Theater in Monte Carlo where the best singers of Europe, including Feodor Chaliapin, Enrico Caruso and Dmitri Smirnov, performed at that time. However, Yudin declined this invitation as he did not consider himself ready for an international debut at such a high level.

At the beginning of 1914, after some conflict with the Bolshoi management, which continued to underrate him, Yudin became engaged in Sergei Zimin's private opera house where he performed all the leading parts of a lyric tenor and became a leader of a troupe that successfully competed with the Bolshoi. His partners in Zimin's opera house were outstanding singers of that period. He sang with Feodor Chaliapin in Charles Gounod's Faust, Gioachino Rossini's The Barber of Seville and several other productions.

In 1919 Yudin returned to the Bolshoi, where he performed the repertoire that made him famous in Sergei Zimin's opera. Also he took part in a unique mock production of The Barber of Seville Upside Down, where he performed the part of Rosina and Antonina Nezhdanova performed the part of Count Almaviva. This experiment required a great vocal mastery from the singers: Yudin, who was capable of singing falsetto parts, was singing Rosina's part in the soprano tessitura. The performance was a huge success owing to the excellent acting of the singers in their unusual emploi.

Yudin had a strong voice with a soft timbre and good diction. He could sing falsetto and his voice was distinguished by the double timbre. It was close to a tenor altino in the upper register, and close to soprano and in the lower register, to baritone. Critics deemed his voice to be a strong, manly, lyric tenor. This was a useful quality to him as it made him more unique compared to other renown tenors

In the 1920s Yudin becomes involved in directing operas and training younger singers. In 1932-33 he made a few productions in the Bolshoi having employed a group of young singers: Rigoletto by Giuseppe Verdi, Pagliacci by Ruggero Leoncavallo, Mozart and Salieri by Rimsky-Korsakov.

His vocal career ended in 1941. His last works as a director in the Bolshoi second stage were Tosca by Giacomo Puccini, Dubrovsky by Eduard Nápravník and The Barber of Seville by Gioachino Rossini.

During World War II Yudin worked as a director and a teacher in the Moscow Opera Studio. One of his pupils was his daughter Tatiana Sergeyevna Yudina, the future soloist of the Stanislavski and Nemirovich-Danchenko Moscow Academic Music Theatre and of the All-Union Radio.

From 1948 until 1963 Yudin was a professor at the Moscow Conservatory. His book “The Singer and His Voice” was published in 1947. He described his stage and teaching experience in it.

Yudin's family lived in a five-room apartment in Ogaryov street 3, apt. 62. The walls of the apartment were adorned by Italian landscapes painted by Sergei Yudin's brother and by maquettes of the scenes of operatic productions. The family spent summers in their dacha in Nikolina Gora. To the last days of his life Yudin lived for his profession and his art.

Sergei Petrovich Yudin died on 5 July 1963. He was buried in Novodevichy Cemetery, plot 8 row 30.

== Selected operatic parts ==
- Alfredo in La traviata by Giuseppe Verdi
- Bagoas in Judith by Alexander Serov
- Bayan in Ruslan and Lyudmila by Mikhail Glinka
- Canio in Pagliacci by Ruggero Leoncavallo
- Count Almaviva in The Barber of Seville by Gioachino Rossini
- Erekle in Il tradimento by Mikhail Ippolitov-Ivanov
- Faust in Faust by Charles Gounod
- Fra Diavolo in Fra Diavolo ou L’hotellerie de Terracin by Daniel Auber
- Gérald in Lakmé by Léo Delibes
- Le Chevalier des Grieux in Manon by Jules Massenet
- Lensky in Eugene Onegin by Pyotr Ilyich Tchaikovsky in 1913
- Levko in May Night by Nikolai Rimsky-Korsakov
- Lohengrin in Lohengrin by Richard Wagner
- Mozart in Mozart and Salieri by Nikolai Rimsky-Korsakov
- Muri in The Mandarin's Son by César Cui, 1914
- Nadir in Les pêcheurs de perles by Georges Bizet
- Prince Leopold in La Juive by Fromental Halévy, 1914
- Prince Sinodal in The Demon by Anton Rubinstein
- Rodolfo in La bohème by Giacomo Puccini
- Roméo in Roméo et Juliette by Charles Gounod
- Ryleyev in Decembrists by Vasily Zolotarev
- Schukar in Virgin Soil Upturned (Podnyataya tselina) by Ivan Dzerzhinsky in 1938
- The Astrologer in The Golden Cockerel by Nikolai Rimsky-Korsakov in 1924
- The Duke in Rigoletto by Giuseppe Verdi in 1929
- The Indian in Sadko by Nikolai Rimsky-Korsakov
- Tsar Berendey in The Snow Maiden by Nikolai Rimsky-Korsakov
- Vladimir Dubrovsky in Dubrovsky by Eduard Nápravník
- Vladimir Igorevich in Prince Igor by Alexander Borodin

== Sources ==
- Погружение в классику. Сергей Юдин, тенор. Арии из опер, романсы. Записи 1912, 1914 г.
- Юдин Сергей Петрович // Отечественные певцы. 1750—1917: Словарь / Пружанский А. М. — Изд. 2-е испр. и доп. — М., 2008.
- Юдин Сергей Петрович (1889–1963) // Вокально-энциклопедический словарь: Биобиблиография : в 5 т. / М. С. Агин. — М., 1991–1994.
