= Camille Cerf (filmmaker) =

Belgian filmmaker

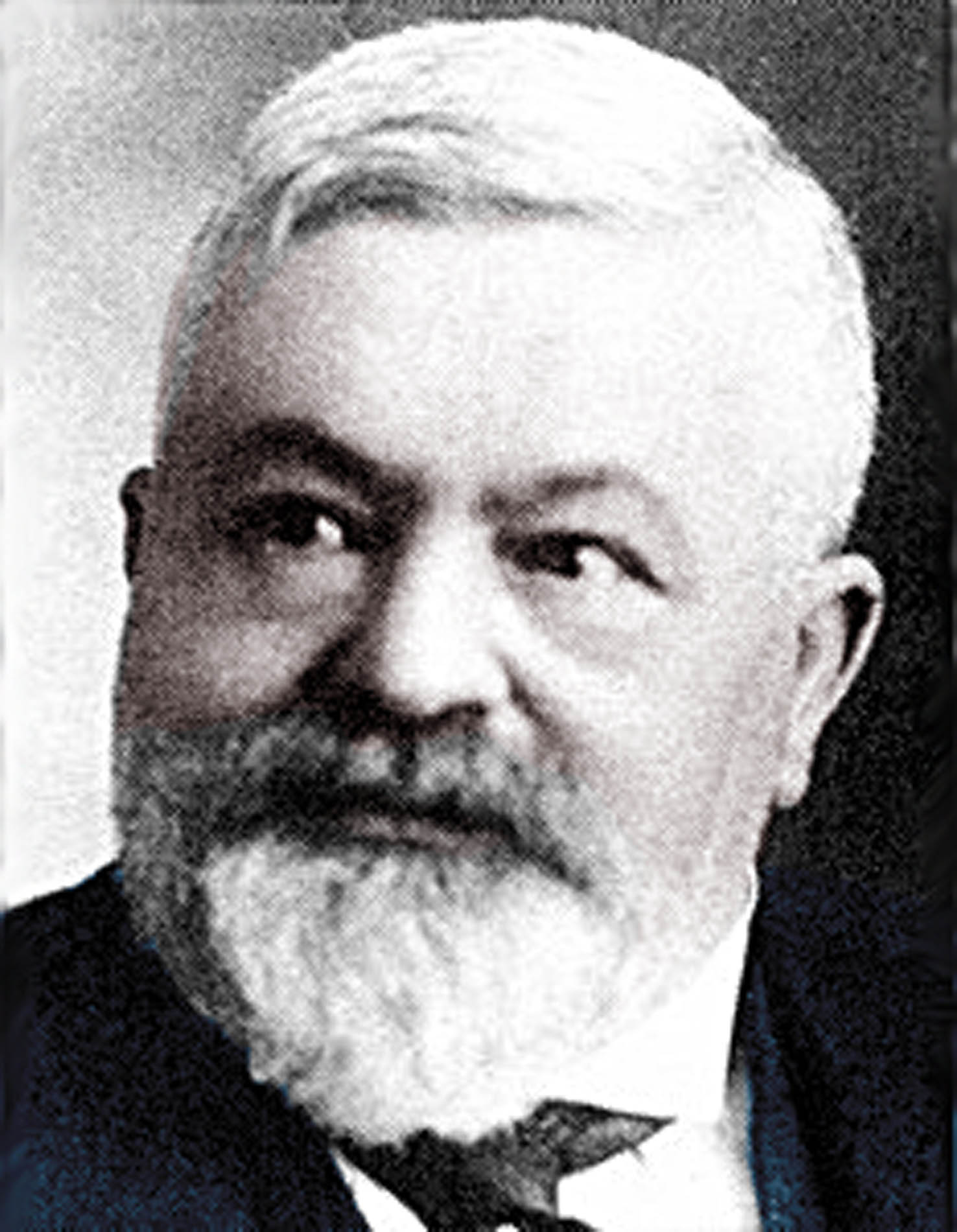

Camille Cerf (1862 - 1936), born in Arlon, was a Belgian filmmaker who worked with the Lumière brothers, mainly as a camera operator, during the late nineteenth and twentieth centuries. He was responsible for producing the first film in Russia, which was the recording the coronation of Czar Nicholas II at the Kremlin in May 1896. On March 12, 1896, he organized the opening of Lumiere Cinematographe.
