= Kharkiv National Academy of Urban Economy =

Public university in Kharkiv, Ukraine

Coordinates: 49.9950°N 36.2420°E

O. M. Beketov National University of Urban Economy in Kharkiv
- Харківський національний університет міського господарства імені О. М. Бекетова
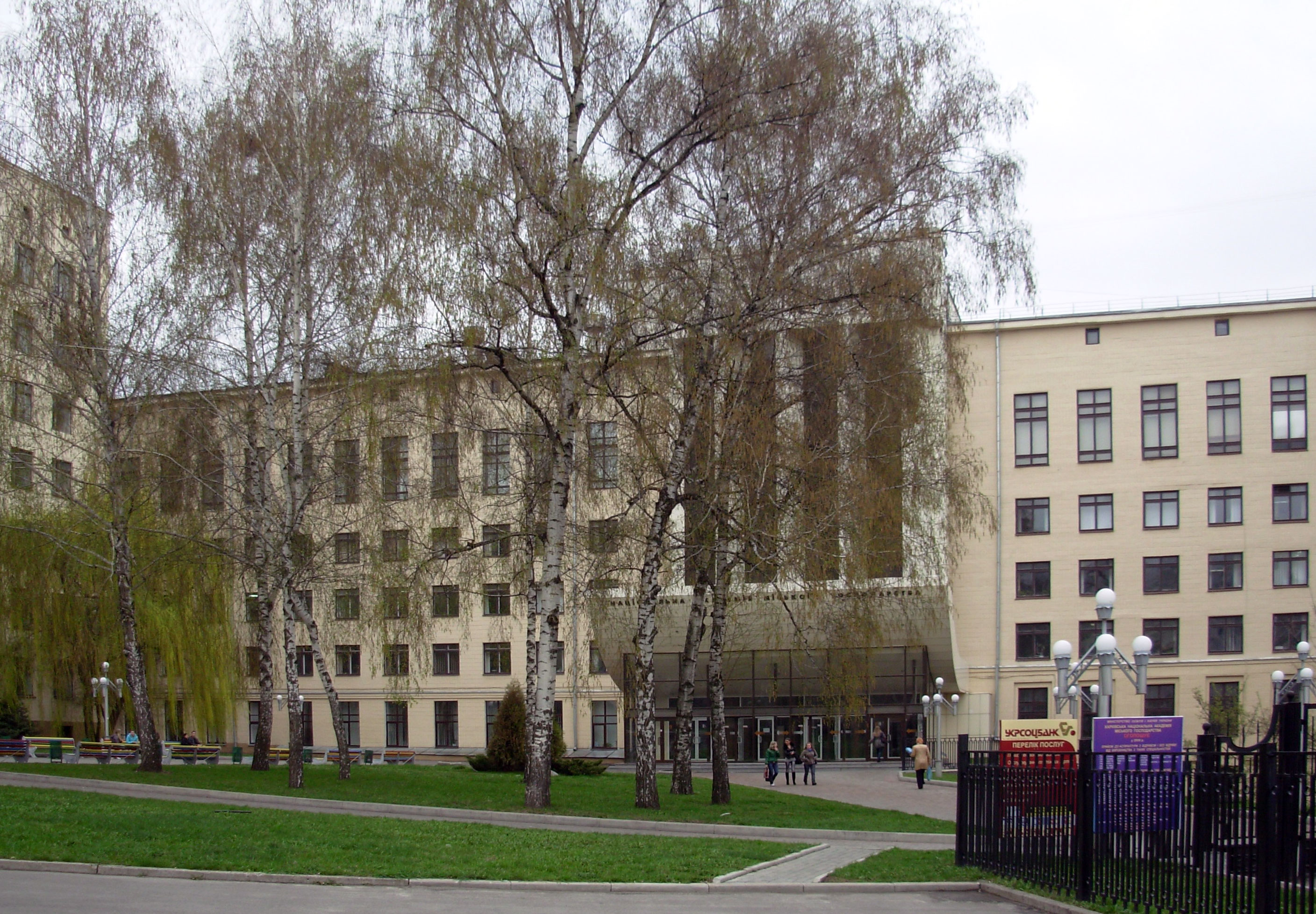
- Established: 1922
- Affiliations: Ministry of Education and Science of Ukraine
- Rector: Ihor Biletskyi
- Students: 15000
- Location: Kharkiv, Kharkiv Oblast, Ukraine
- Website: www.kname.edu.ua

University rankings

Regional – Overall
- QS Emerging Europe and Central Asia: 301–350 (2022)

The O. M. Beketov National University of Urban Economy in Kharkiv (Ukrainian: Харківський національний університет міського господарства, romanized: Kharkivskyi natsionalnyi universytet miskoho hospodarstva; before 2013 — academy) is a Ukrainian public university in Kharkiv, named after Oleksiy M. Beketov and specialising in urban development studies.

== History ==
The educational institution was founded in 1922 as the All-Ukrainian College of Municipal Services (Ukrainian: Всеукраїнський технікум комунального господарства). Since 1924 – Faculty of Municipal Services of the Evening Workers' College of National Economy (Ukrainian: Вечірній робочий технікум народного господарства), since 1929 – Faculty of Municipal Services of the Kharkiv Institute of National Economy. Since 1930 – the Kharkiv Institute of Public Utilities, and since 1935 – the Kharkiv Training School of Public Utilities, which included the Kharkiv Institute of Public Utilities and the College of Sustainable Construction. In 1938, the Kharkiv Institute of Public Utilities was renamed into Kharkiv Institute of Public Construction, and in 1939 – into Kharkiv Institute of Municipal Construction Engineers. In 1941, the Kharkiv Training School of Public Utilities was liquidated, the Kharkiv Institute of Municipal Construction Engineers and the College of Sustainable Construction were separated into separate educational institutions.

In 1952–1959, Major General Mikhail Snegov was the head of the institute's military department.

In 1989, Kharkiv Institute of Municipal Construction Engineers was renamed into Kharkiv Institute of Municipal Engineers, 1994 – into Kharkiv State Academy of Urban Economy. In 2003, the academy received the status of a national one.

On July 19, 2008, the academy signed the Budapest Open Access Initiative and became its 436th member organization.

In 2013, the Kharkiv State Academy of Urban Economy was renamed into O. M. Beketov Kharkiv State University of Urban Economy.

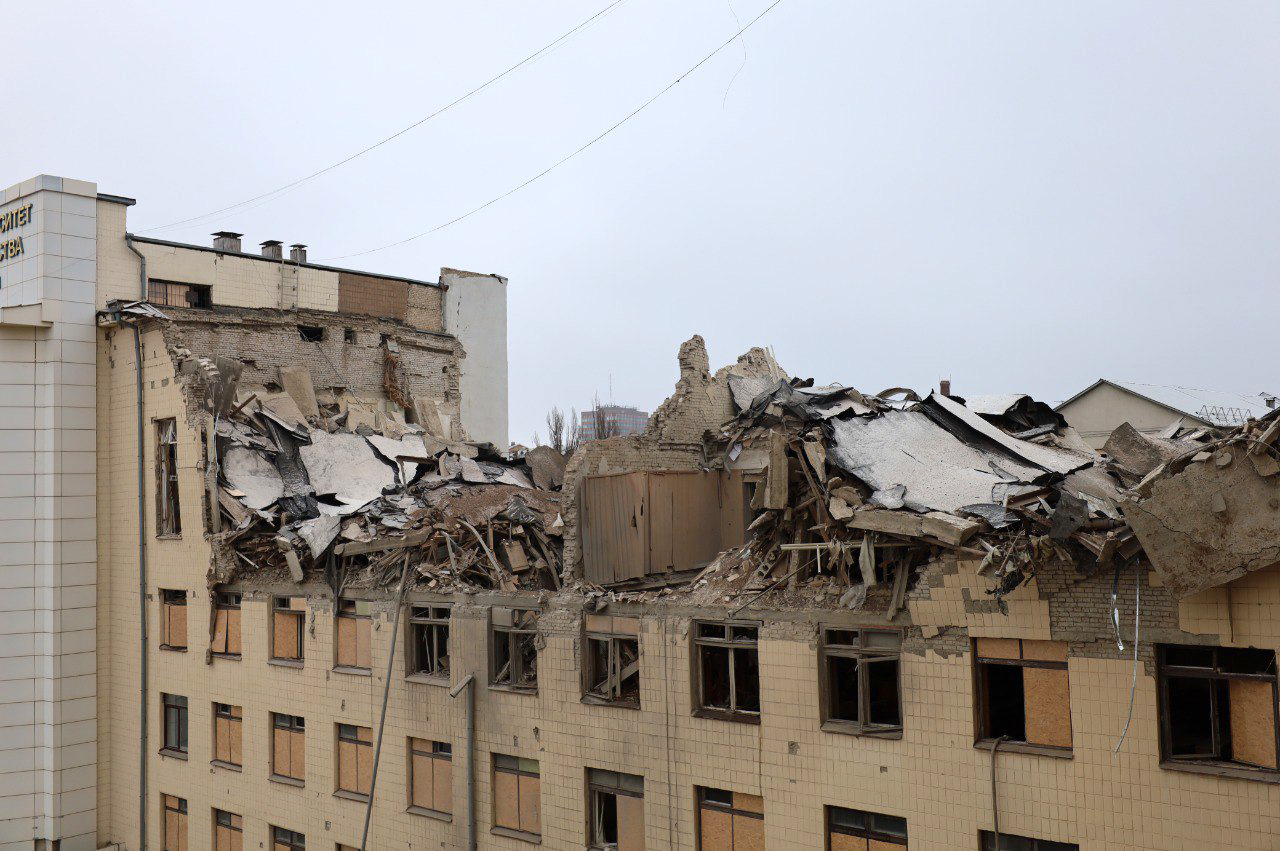
Main building after Russian rocket strike on February 5, 2023

In 2022, the Housing and Communal College of the university was destroyed by a Russian rocket strike.

In 2023, a new strike destroyed part of the main building.

== Campuses and buildings ==
The academy has six academic buildings, education and research laboratories, a library with holdings of 882,000 books, a campus with six student hostels, an indoors sports facility with track and field gymnastics, bodybuilding, boxing, oriental martial art facilities and gyms.

== Institutes and faculties ==
- Academic and Research Institute of Architecture, Design, and Fine Arts
- Academic and Research Institute of Civil Engineering and Utility Systems
- Academic and Research Institute of Economics and Management
- Academic and Research Institute of Energy, Information and Transport Infrastructure
  - Department of Automation and Computer Integrated Technologies
- Academic and Research Institute of Doctoral and Postdoctoral Studies
- Faculty for Foreign Students

== See also ==
List of universities in Ukraine
