= Hanna Alchevska =

Ukrainian artist, teacher, public figure

- Алчевська Ганна Олексіївна
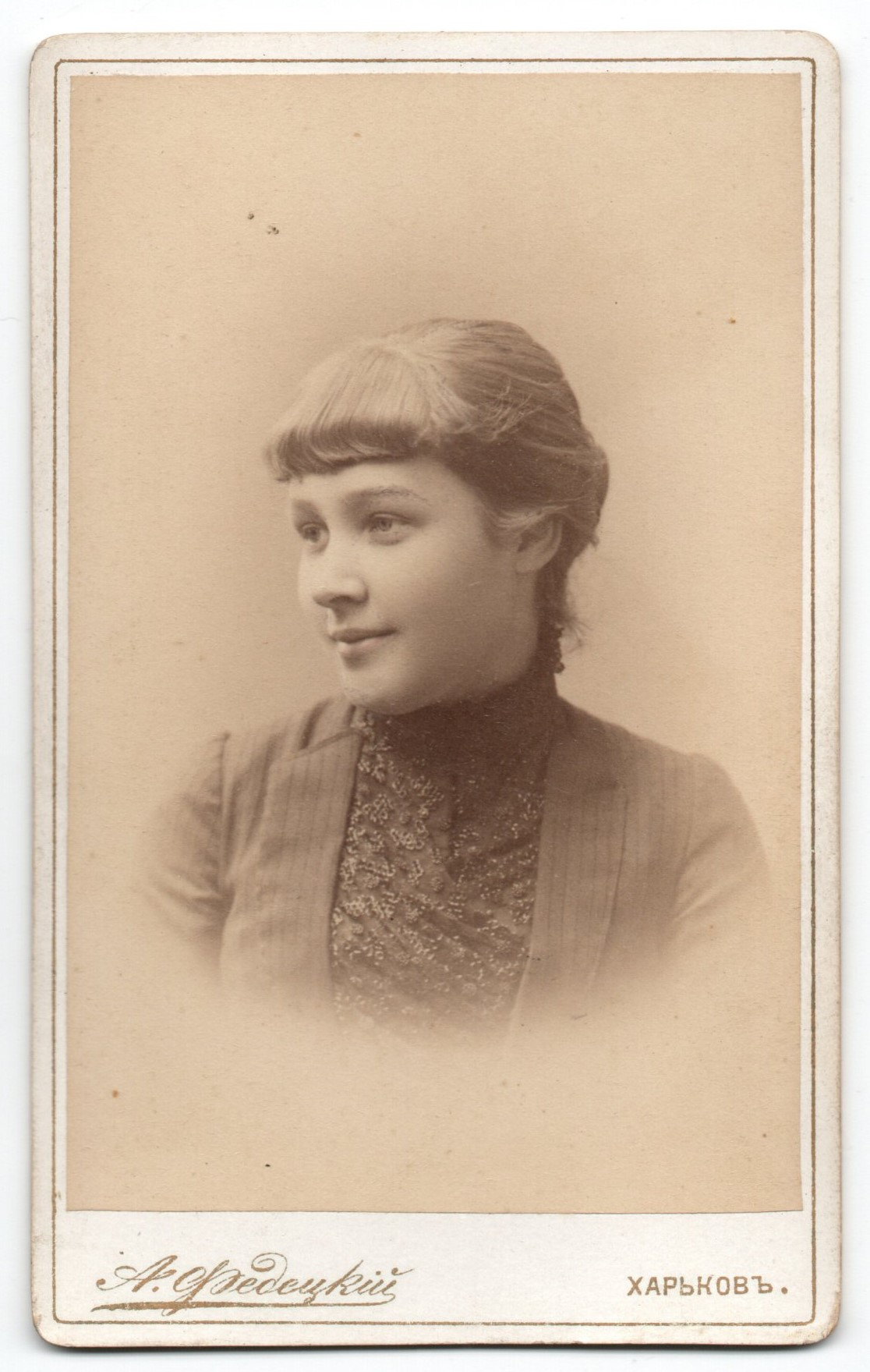
- Born: 1868; Kharkiv, Kharkiv Governorate
- Died: 1931 (aged 62–63); Alushta, Crimean ASSR
- Resting place: Alushta
- Education: Kharkiv Art School; Kharkiv Mariinsky Women's Gymnasium; Maria Raevska-Ivanova School of Painting
- Occupations: artist, teacher, public figure.
- Employer(s): Kharkiv Society for the Dissemination of Literacy among the People; Kharkiv Women's Sunday School of her mother;
- Spouse: Oleksiy Mykolaovych Beketov (1899 — 1931)
- Children: Khrystyna Oleksiivna Beketova, Mykola Oleksiyovych Beketov, Maria Oleksiivna Beketova, Olena Oleksiivna Beketova
- Parents: Oleksiy Alchevsky (father); Khrystyna Alchevska (mother)

Hanna Oleksiivna Alchevska (Ukrainian: Ганна Олексіївна Алчевська, married Ukrainian: Бекетова, Beketova) (1868, Kharkiv, Kharkiv Governorate, Russian Empire – 1931, Alushta, Crimean ASSR, RSFSR, USSR) was a Ukrainian artist, teacher, and public figure. She was a representative of the Alchevsky-Beketov family.

== Biography ==
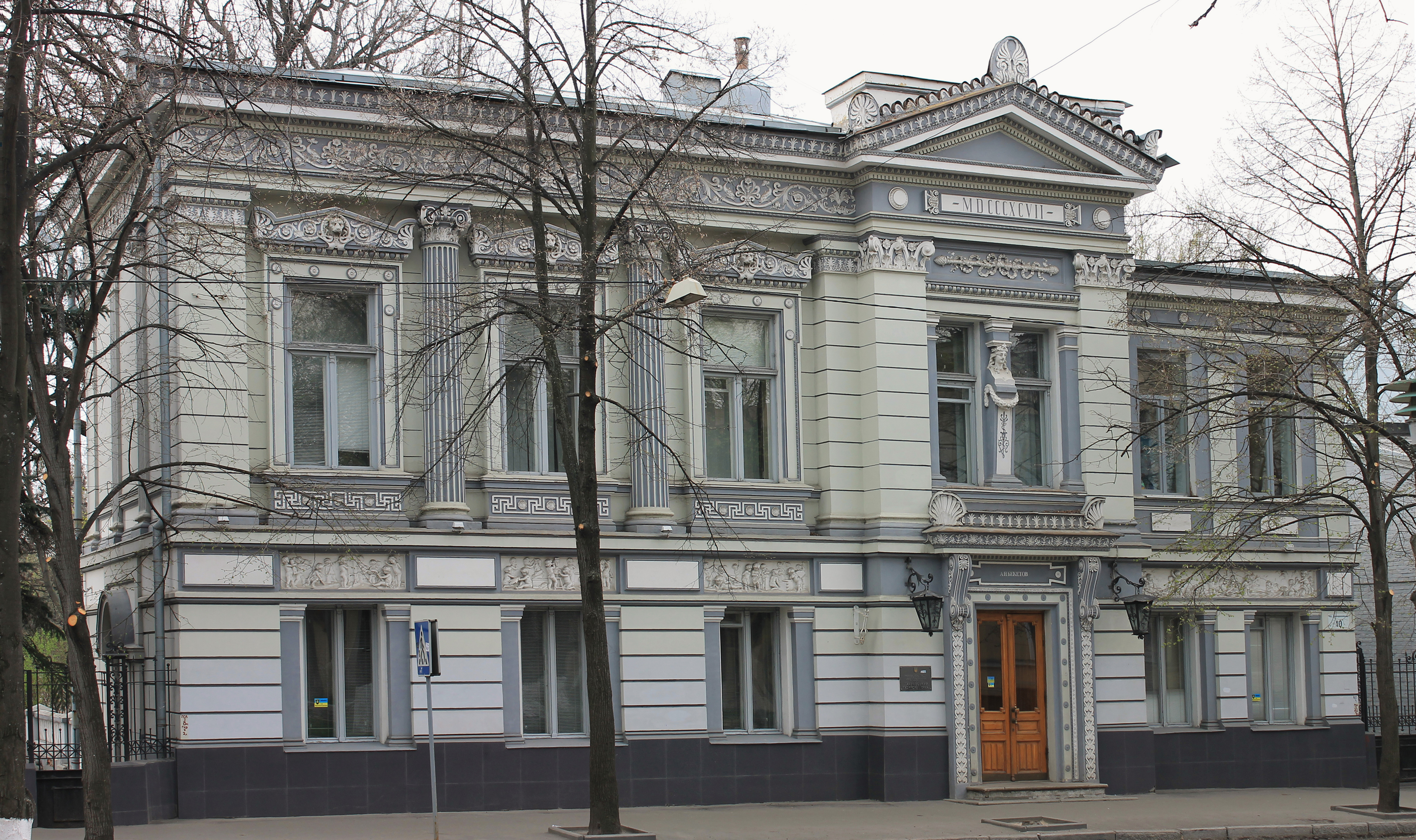
Own house on Zhon-Myronosyts Street (1896–1897, built according to her husband's design. Now the Kharkiv House of Scientists is located here)

Born in Kharkiv in 1868, Hanna was the eldest daughter of Oleksiy and Khrystyna Alchevsky. She graduated from the Kharkiv Art School. She had a talent for painting and graduated with honors from the Kharkiv Mariinsky Women's Gymnasium. She also improved her artistic skills at the Maria Raevska-Ivanova School of Painting. Maria Raevska-Ivanova turned to the rich experience and pedagogical talent of Dmytro Bezperchy, inviting Bryullov Karl's student to create the charter of the Kharkiv City School of Drawing. Hanna Alchevska (Beketova) and her husband provided financial assistance to this art school, as reported by the newspaper "Kharkiv Governorate Gazette". Later, O.M. Beketov taught the theory of architectural skill at the school for free.

Together with her mother, she participated in the work of the Kharkiv Society for the Dissemination of Literacy among the People. She taught at the Kharkiv Women's Sunday School of her mother, a well-known educator.

In 1889, she married a promising and talented Ukrainian architect, Oleksiy Mykolaovych Beketov. The wedding took place on September 17 at the St. Anthony Church of Kharkiv University. She lived happily with him for 42 years, and they had 4 children. A well-known portrait of Hanna Alchevska was painted in watercolor by her husband Oleksiy Beketov in 1900. For many years, she served as the architect's secretary.

She died in Alushta on August 5, 1931. She is buried in the old cemetery of this city near Mount Demerdzhi.

== Children ==
- Khrystyna Oleksiivna Beketova (married Yurkovska) (1890-1972) — graphic artist, specialized in etching. Author of memoirs about her uncle, the outstanding tenor Alchevsky I.O..
- Mykola Oleksiyovych Beketov (1891-1964) — by profession a sailor, died in Canada;
- Maria Oleksiivna Beketova (1893-1921) — died in Central Asia during an infectious epidemic.
- Olena Oleksiivna Beketova (married Rofe) (1895-1990) — served as her father's secretary and assistant, was the keeper of the archives of the Alchevsky and Beketov families. Buried in the city cemetery No. 2 (Kharkiv).

== Gallery ==
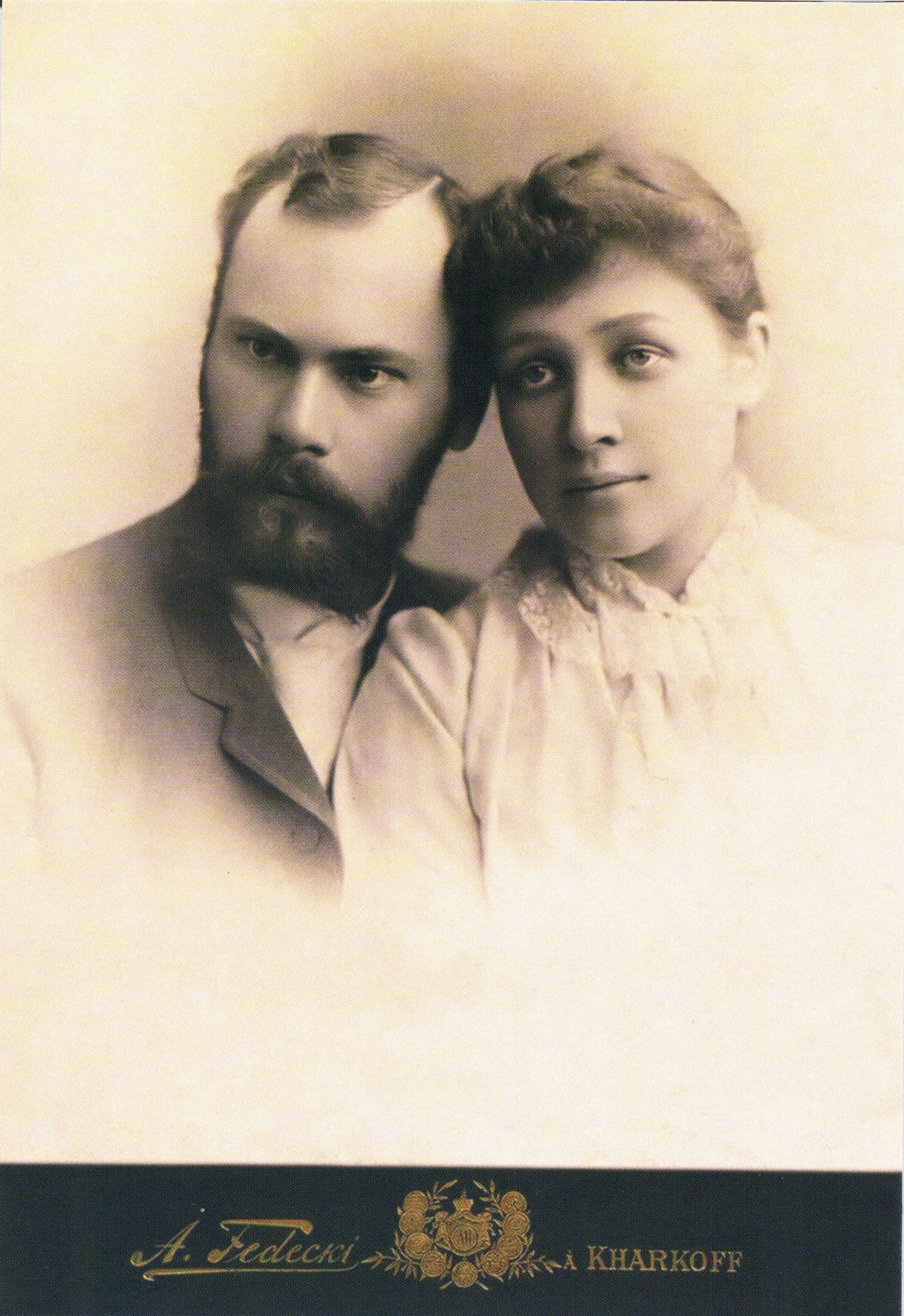
Hanna Alchevska and her husband Oleksiy Beketov. Photo taken by photographer Alfred Fedetsky in the 1890s

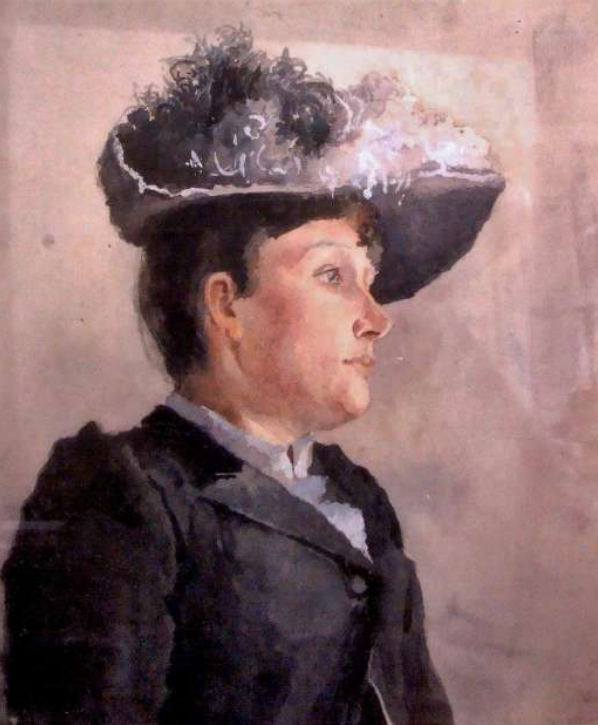
Portrait of Hanna Alchevska by her husband Oleksiy Beketov (1900)

== See also ==
- Alchevski family
- Beketov family
- Beketov-Alchevsky Mansion on Zhon-Myronosyts Street
- Beketov-Alchevsky Mansion on Darwin Street
- Oleksiy Mykolaovych Beketov
- Oleksiy Kyrylovych Alchevskyiy
- Khrystyna Danylivna Alchevska

== Sources ==
- Book-calendar for 2017 "Great fellow countrymen: Alchevsky and their environment". Consulting group "Rubanenko and partners".
- Lensky O. V. The Alchevsky family. Sumy.- Own publishing house of Lensky- 2012, - 40 p.
- Portrait of the wife [Visual material] / O. M. Beketov // O. M. Beketov, academician of architecture: research. and materials / [edited by A. P. Buryak; comp.: I. R. Akmen, A. Yu. Kornev]. - Kharkiv: Rarities of Ukraine, 2012. - P. 20. - (Kharkiv architectural).
- Belov Yu. E.. Alchevsky: According to the publications of city newspapers [Text] / Yu. Belov - Alchevsk: S. A. Bondarenko [publisher], 2008. - 160 p. : ill., photo. - (Pages of history). - 1000 copies. - ISBN 978-966-2167-01-6 P.157
- Miloslavsky, K. E. [in co-authorship] // Ivan Alchevsky: Memories. Materials. Correspondence / Intro. article "Giant of the opera stage", arrangement and notes by I. Lysenko, K. Miloslavsky. - K.: Muz. Ukr., 1980. - 294 p.
- Raevskaya's Drawing School - Ivanova // Kharkiv Governorate Gazette - 1895 - November 19
