= Adolf Konstantinopolsky =

Soviet and Ukrainian artist of battle scenes

Adolf Markovich Konstantinopolsky
- Адольф Маркович Константинопольский
- Born: 20 April 1923; Kharkiv
- Died: 1 December 1993 (aged 70); Kharkiv
- Citizenship: Soviet, Ukraine
- Education: Kharkiv State Academy of Arts
- Occupation: Painter

Adolf Markovich Konstantinopolsky (Russian: Адольф Маркович Константинопольский; 20 April 1923, Kharkiv — 1 December 1993, Kharkiv) was a Soviet and Ukrainian artist of battle scenes. He fought in the World War II and was awarded the Order of the Red Star (1945). He earned the title of Merited Artist of Ukraine (1974), and People's Artist of Ukraine (1991). He was Full Professor.

== Education ==
Adolf Konstantonopolsky was born in Kharkiv in the family of a white-collar worker.

He studied at the Kharkiv State School of Art (1940–1941) and at the Kharkiv State Academy of Arts (1948–1954); among his professors were Yury V. Balanovsky, G. A. Tomenko, O. P. Lezina. He painted "Days of Mourning" and "People's Mourning" as his graduation assignment under the guidance of S. F. Besedin.

== Art exhibitions ==
Konstantinopolsky took part in art exhibitions since 1954.

One of the first artist's early paintings, "Native Soil", was exhibited at a Ukrainian art exhibition in 1957. The work received positive reviews from viewers and critics, and was later categorized among the notable battle paintings of the Ukrainian SSR concerning World War II. The large-scale canvas depicts various groups of soldiers, focused on their individual expressions while maintaining a unified thematic mood.

His works were exhibited at art exhibitions in Canada (1962) and Italy (1975).

As "The Artists of Kharkiv" guide published in 1967 states, "the best of [his] works have become an asset of the Ukrainian Soviet fine arts."

Konstantinopolsky was a regular participant in various provincial, Ukrainian, All-Union, and foreign (outside of the Soviet Union) art exhibitions.

=== Solo exhibitions ===
- Kharkiv — 1974, 1983, 1992 and 1998 (retrospective)
- Kyiv — 1975

== Teaching arts ==
Adolf Konstantinopolsky taught arts at Kharkiv State School of Art (1954–1956), and at Kharkiv Art and Industrial School (later renamed into Kharkiv State Academy of Design and Arts) from 1960.

== Achievements ==
Konstantinopolsky was a member of the National Union of Artists of Ukraine since 1958.

He participated in the creation of:

the panel picture "October Revolution" for the main pavilion of the Expocenter of Ukraine in Kyiv (1958, with O. A. Khmelnitsky, O. P. Atsmanchuk, and M. I. Krivenko as co-authors);

the diorama "Crossing the Dnieper and Creating a Bridgehead near the Village of Lyutizh on the Approaches to Kyiv."

He painted the following paintings:

"Native Soil" (1957);
"The Soviet Power has been proclaimed! Kharkiv. 1917" (1959-60, with O. A. Khmelnitsky as a co-author);
"Soldiers" (1960);
"At Dawn" (1961);
"Katerina" (after Taras Shevchenko, 1961);
"Varangian" (1954—1965);
"Returning from Reconnaissance";
"The First Spring";

etc.

His works are located in:

the National Museum of the History of Ukraine in the Second World War,
the Kharkiv Art Museum,
Ternopil museum,
Kryvyi Rih museum, and
private collections.

== Awards ==
- Medal "For the Victory over Germany in the Great Patriotic War 1941–1945" (09.05.1945)
- Order of the Red Star (02.06.1945)
- Order of the Badge of Honour (24.11.1960)
- Order of the Patiotic War, First Class (06.04.1985)

== Memory ==
A memorial plaque was unveiled to Adolf Konstantinopolsky in Kharkiv, at Kultury Street, 20b, where the artist lived.

== See also ==
- Alexander Konstantinopolsky
