= Kharkiv Art School building =

Historic site in Kharkiv, Ukraine

Coordinates: 49.99933319056792°N 36.24562023230441°E

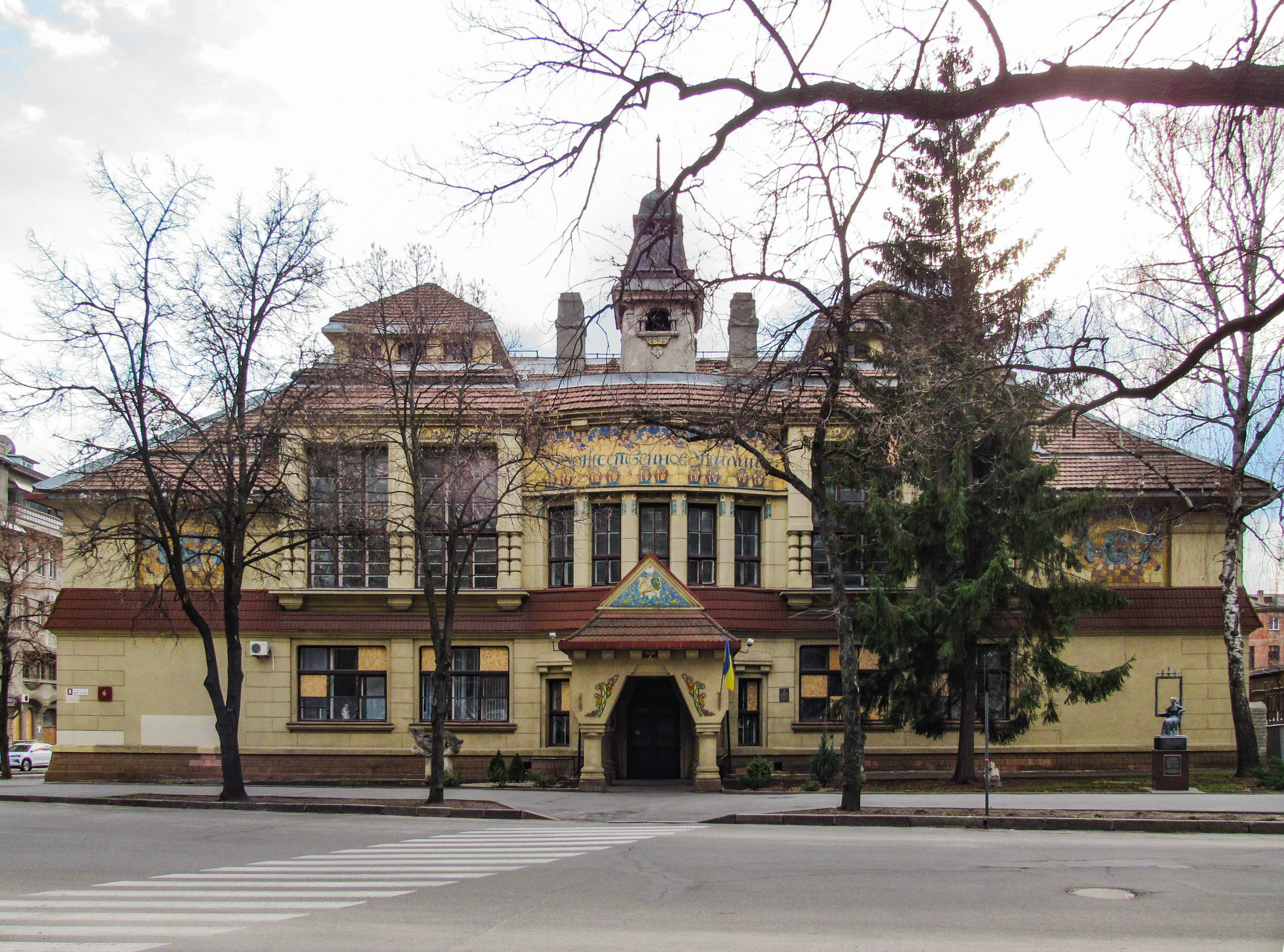
- Interactive map of Kharkiv Art School building
- Location: Ukraine, Kharkiv, Mystetstv Street, 8
- Designer: Kostiantyn Mykolaiovych Zhukov
- Type: school
- Material: brick
- Beginning date: 1912
- Completion date: 1913

Immovable Monument of Local Significance of Ukraine
- Official name: «Художньо-промисловий інститут» (Institute of Industrial Arts)
- Type: Urban Planning, Architecture
- Reference no.: 7228-Ха

The Kharkiv Art School building (Ukrainian: Будівля Харківського художнього училища, romanized: Budivlia Kharkivskoho khudozhnoho uchylyshcha) is an architectural monument of the early 20th century, constructed in the style of Ukrainian Art Nouveau. It is located in the centre of Kharkiv, on Mystetstv Street (formerly Kaplunivska Street). The structure was built between 1912 and 1913 as a specialised facility for the Kharkiv Art School (now the Kharkiv State Academy of Design and Arts), one of the oldest art educational institutions in Ukraine. The project architect was Kostiantyn Mykolaiovych Zhukov.

== History ==
Art education in Kharkiv began in 1869, when Maria Raevska-Ivanova, the first woman in the Russian Empire to hold the title of "free artist," founded private art classes in the city. The institution became the first center of art education on Ukrainian territory and the third in the entire empire. Its curriculum included both academic art (painting, sculpture, drawing) and applied arts. In 1877, the school received its first dedicated building at 6 Chernyshevska Street, which also served as the personal residence of the artist’s family. Raevska-Ivanova married one of the school's instructors, Serhii Oleksandrovych Raevskyi, a public education figure, trustee of the Kharkiv educational district, and member of the city council. In 1896, due in part to the deteriorating health and eventual blindness of Mariia Raevska-Ivanova, the institution came under the care of the city and was officially designated as the "Kharkiv School of Fine Arts".

In 1912, preparations began for the construction of a new building for the educational institution. The winning design of the architectural competition was submitted by Kostiantyn Mykolaiovych Zhukov and executed in the style of Ukrainian Art Nouveau. A plot on Kaplunivska Square was selected as the construction site. The project was subject to heated debates in the city council, revolving around aesthetic, ideological, and financial concerns. Opponents of the Ukrainian style questioned its artistic value and appropriateness for a state institution, while proponents—including leading figures of the Ukrainian national movement—defended the right to an authentic architectural expression. Mykola Mikhnovsky, the founder of Ukrainian nationalism, lawyer, and public figure, who, along with S. Raievskyi, M. Sumtsov, V. Velychko, and others, advocated for the Ukrainian style to be used in the building, stated:

In the speeches of the council deputies, a certain tendency is clearly visible: they claim that the Ukrainian style does not exist. I have nothing to add on this matter to the speech of Professor Sumtsov. I will say only this: nowadays, this is a trend! Now they assert and try to prove that there is no Ukrainian language, no Ukrainian nation, and therefore, no Ukrainian art...

Despite the opposition, the project was approved and realized. In 1913, construction was completed, and on October 22, the official opening of the new building took place. The school began the academic year in its own purpose-built facility. The founder, however, did not live to see the building's completion—she died on December 9 (22), 1912, and was buried in her native village. During the Soviet era, the school was transformed into an art institute. Today, its successor is the Kharkiv State Academy of Design and Arts. The building on Mystetstv Street is regarded as one of Kharkiv’s most striking architectural monuments and a prime example of Ukrainian Art Nouveau.

In 2021, a monument to Mariia Raevska-Ivanova, created by sculptor Nelli Vytvytska, was installed in front of the building. During the full-scale Russian invasion of Ukraine, the monument was temporarily removed for safety reasons but was later returned to its place. Numerous sculptural works created by academy students are situated around the school grounds.

On the night of March 1, 2025, the building sustained damage as a result of a large-scale Russian drone attack on Kharkiv, involving Shahed-type loitering munitions. The strike affected dozens of buildings, including cultural heritage sites, and injured at least 12 people. A pre-trial investigation was launched on the grounds of a war crime.

== Design ==
The building is a characteristic example of Ukrainian Art Nouveau. It features a U-shaped layout and two stories with a risalit. The facades are adorned with decorative maiolica elements, including the coat of arms of Kharkiv and the inscription “Художественное училище” (“Art School”). Panoramic windows provide natural lighting to the interior spaces. The ground floor and basement are finished with rustication, while the second floor is decorated with a band of tiles reminiscent of traditional Ukrainian wooden architecture. Above the main entrance is a canopy supported by columns, and the original wooden doors have been preserved. The tiled roof is crowned with a tower topped by a spire-tent, adding a sense of dynamism to the composition. The building is listed as a local architectural and urban planning monument of significance (No. 7228-Ха).

== Gallery ==
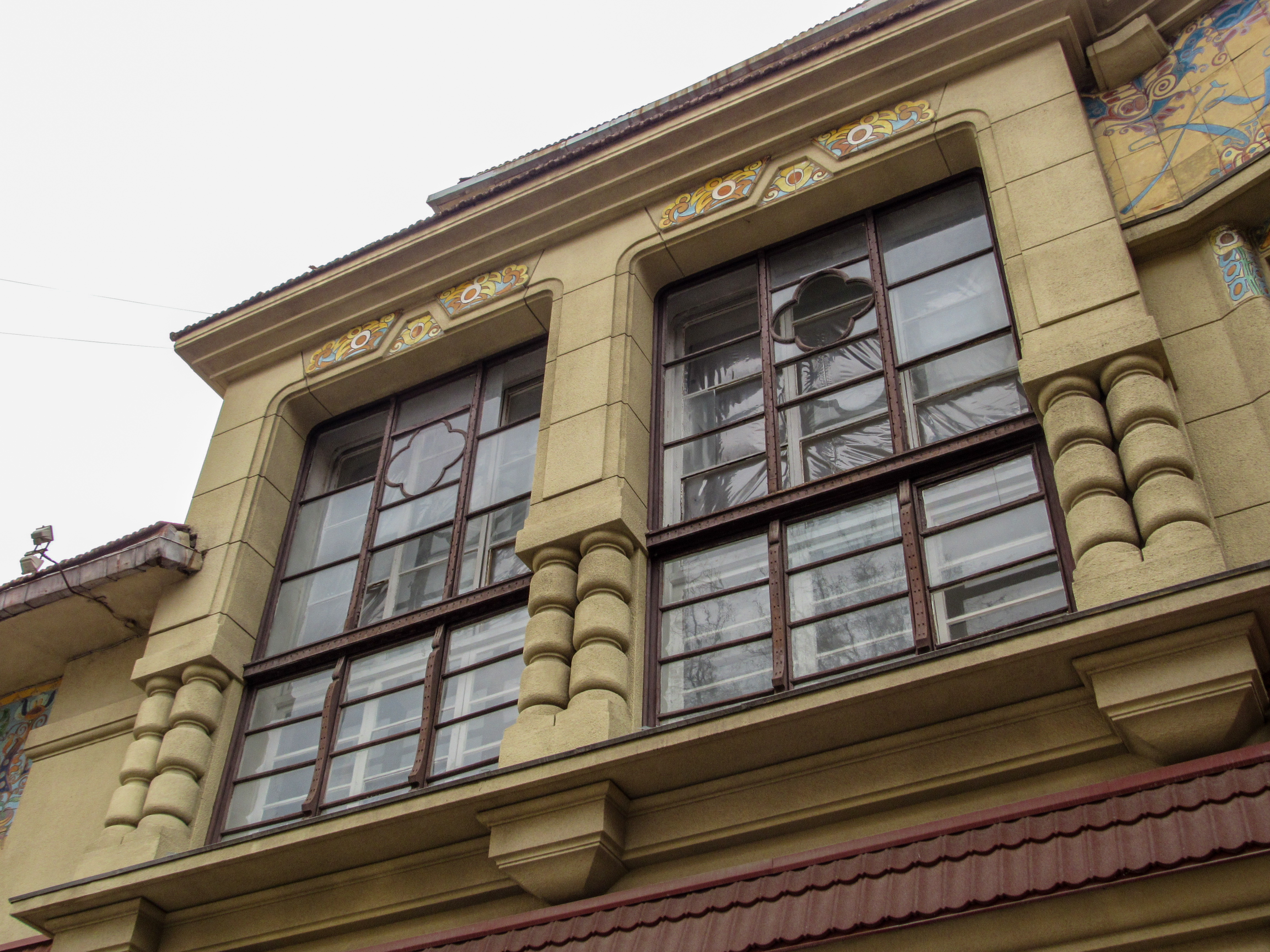
Windows blown out by the explosion, with carved wooden frames

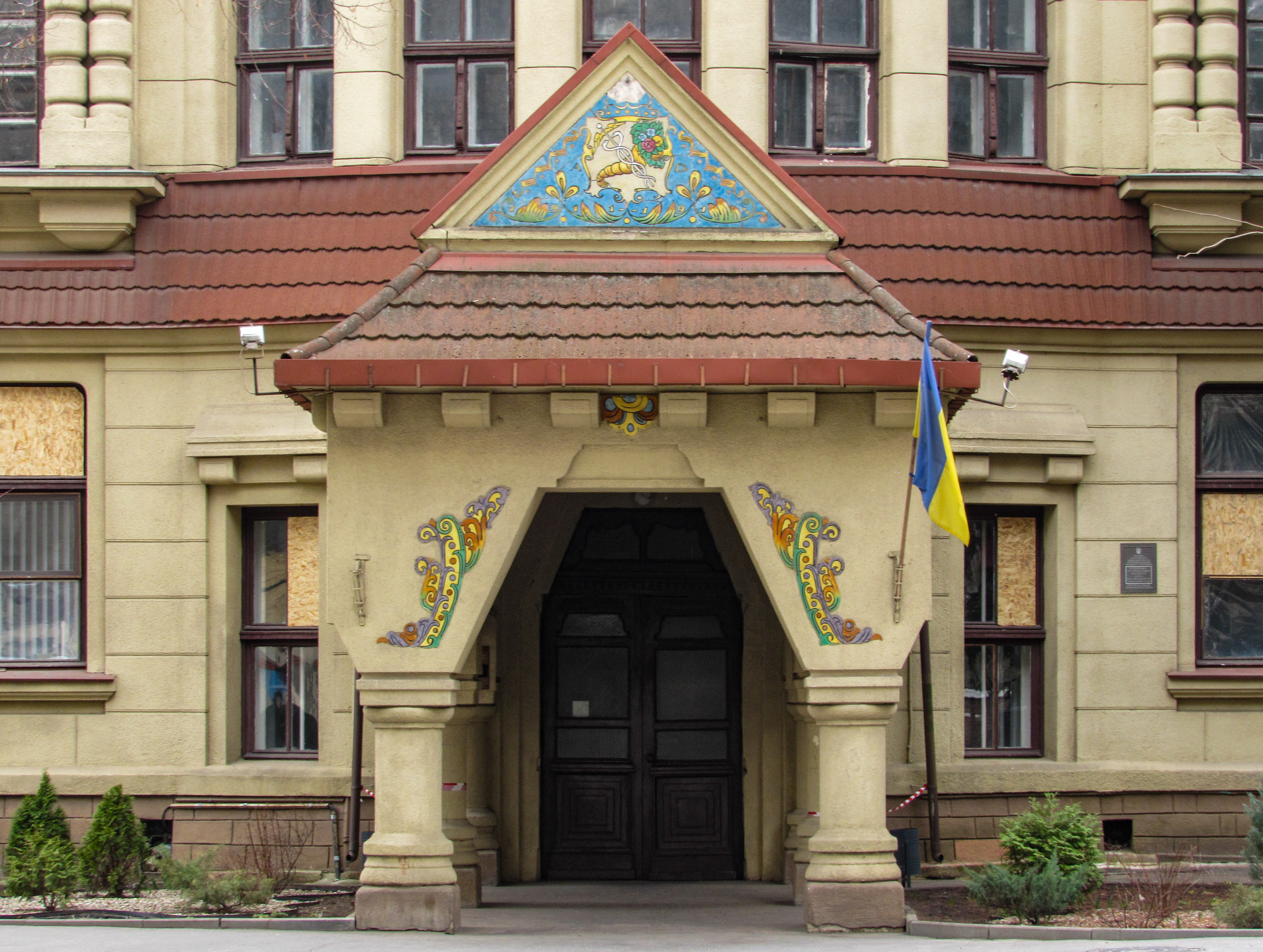
Entrance

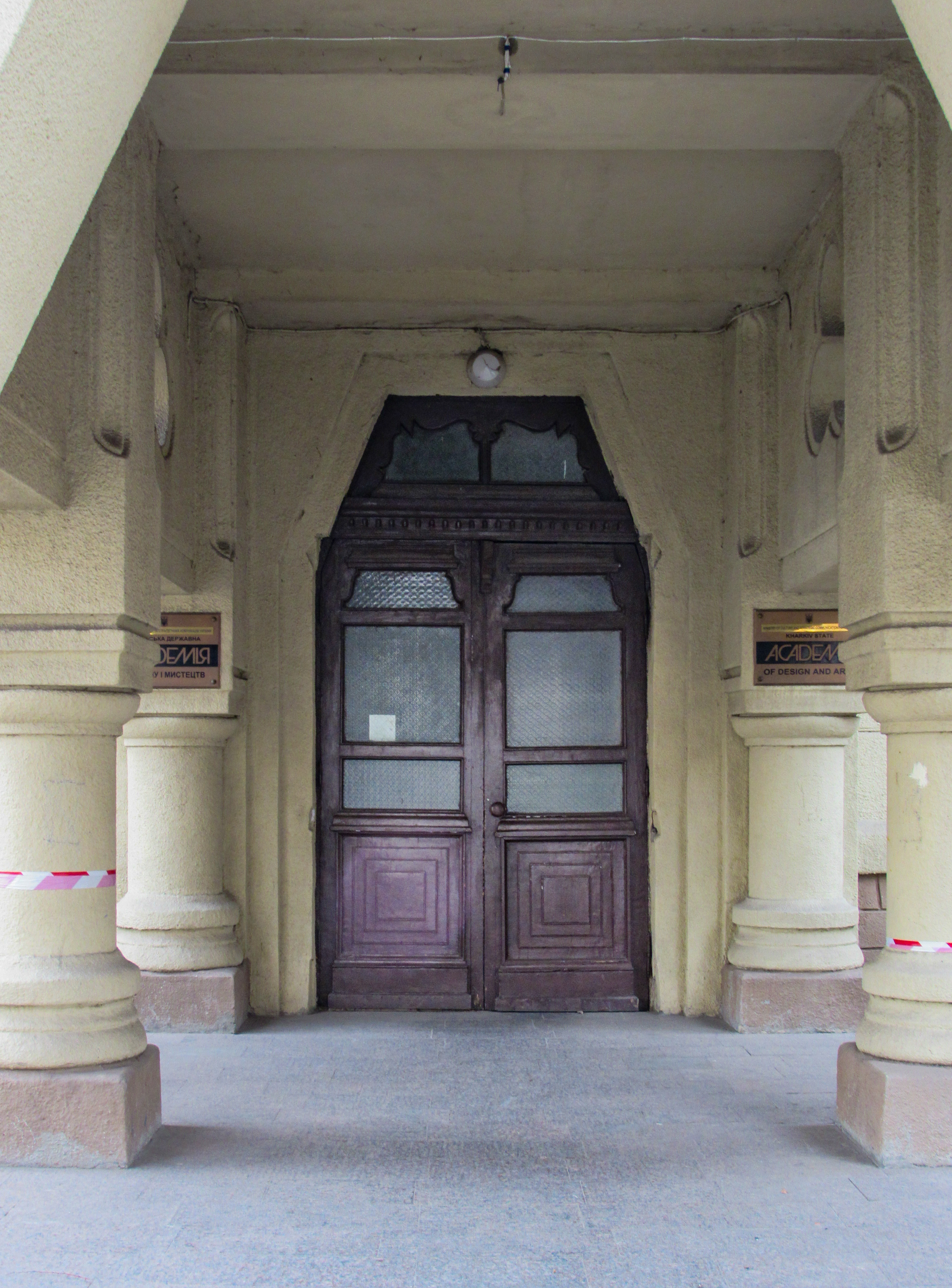
Authentic doors

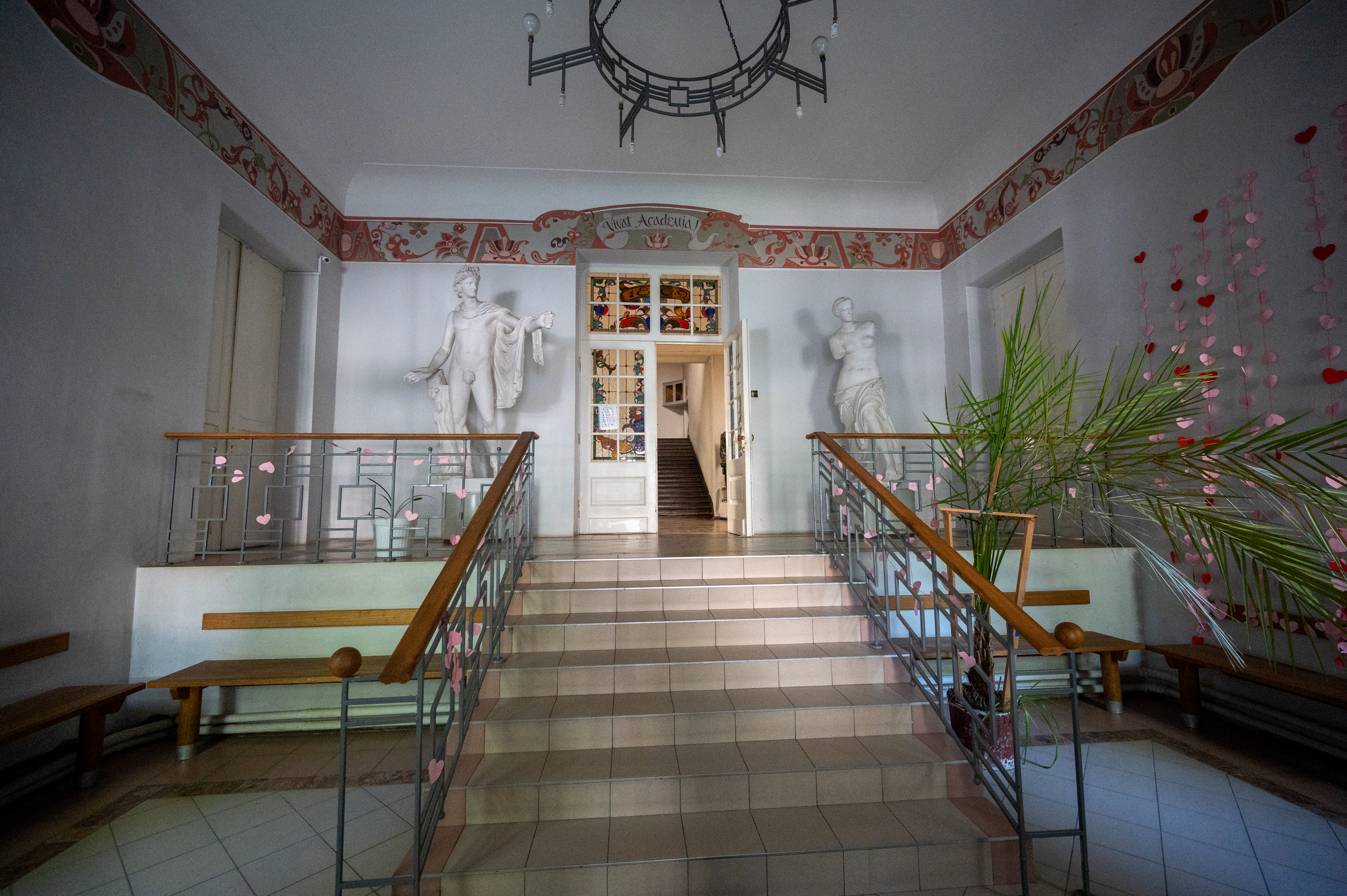
Hall with antique sculptures

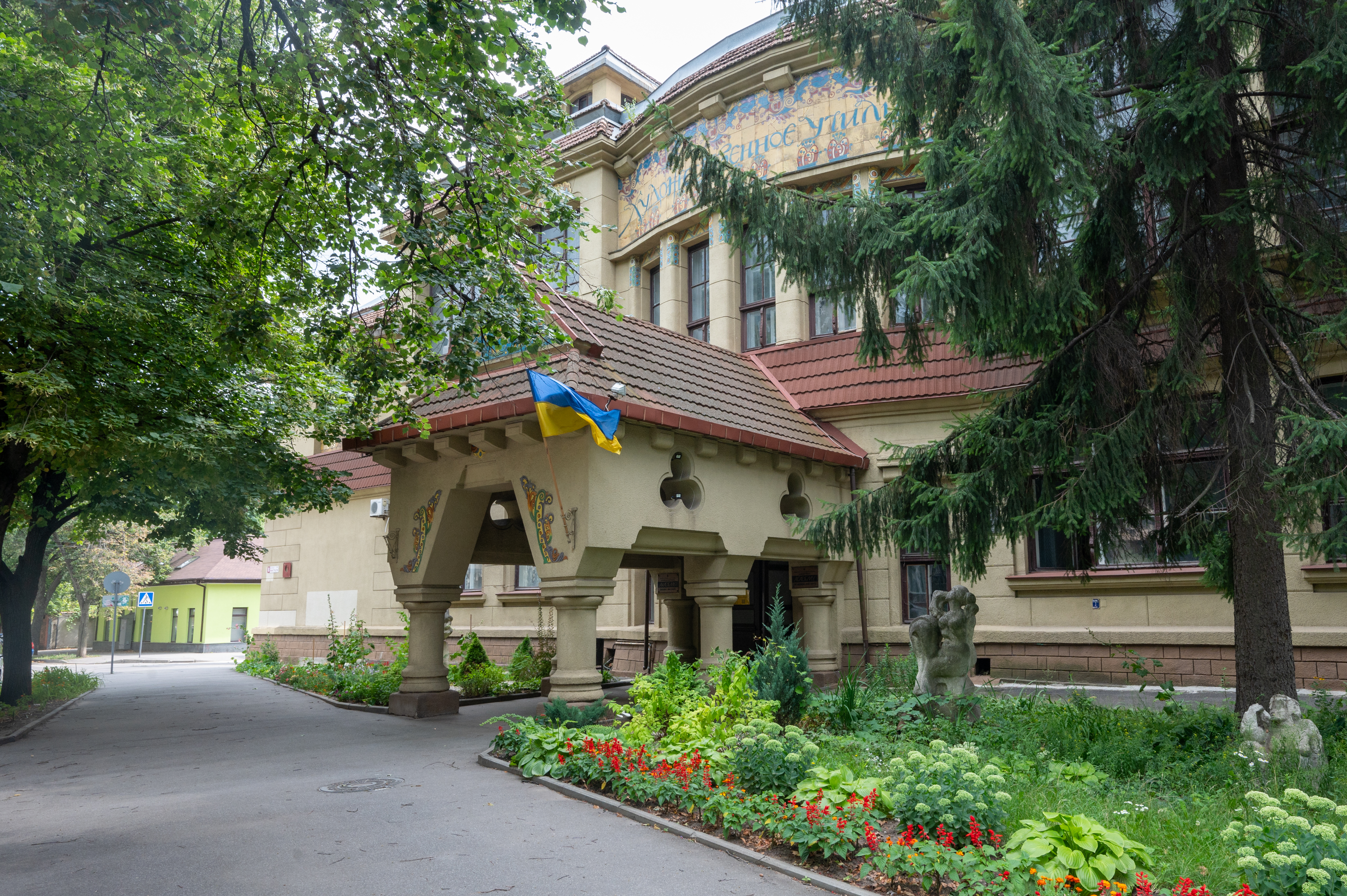
Entrance

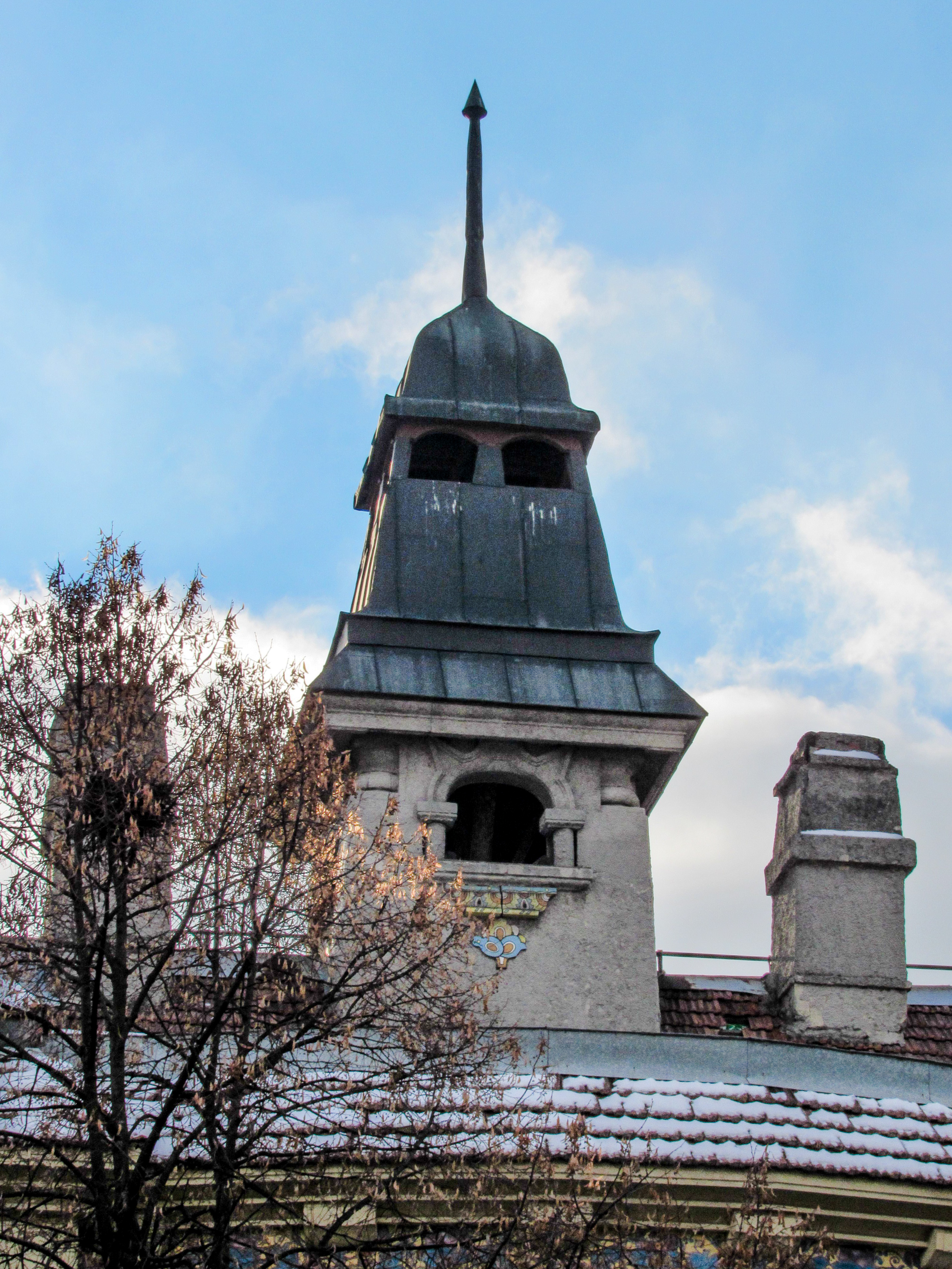
Rooftop tower

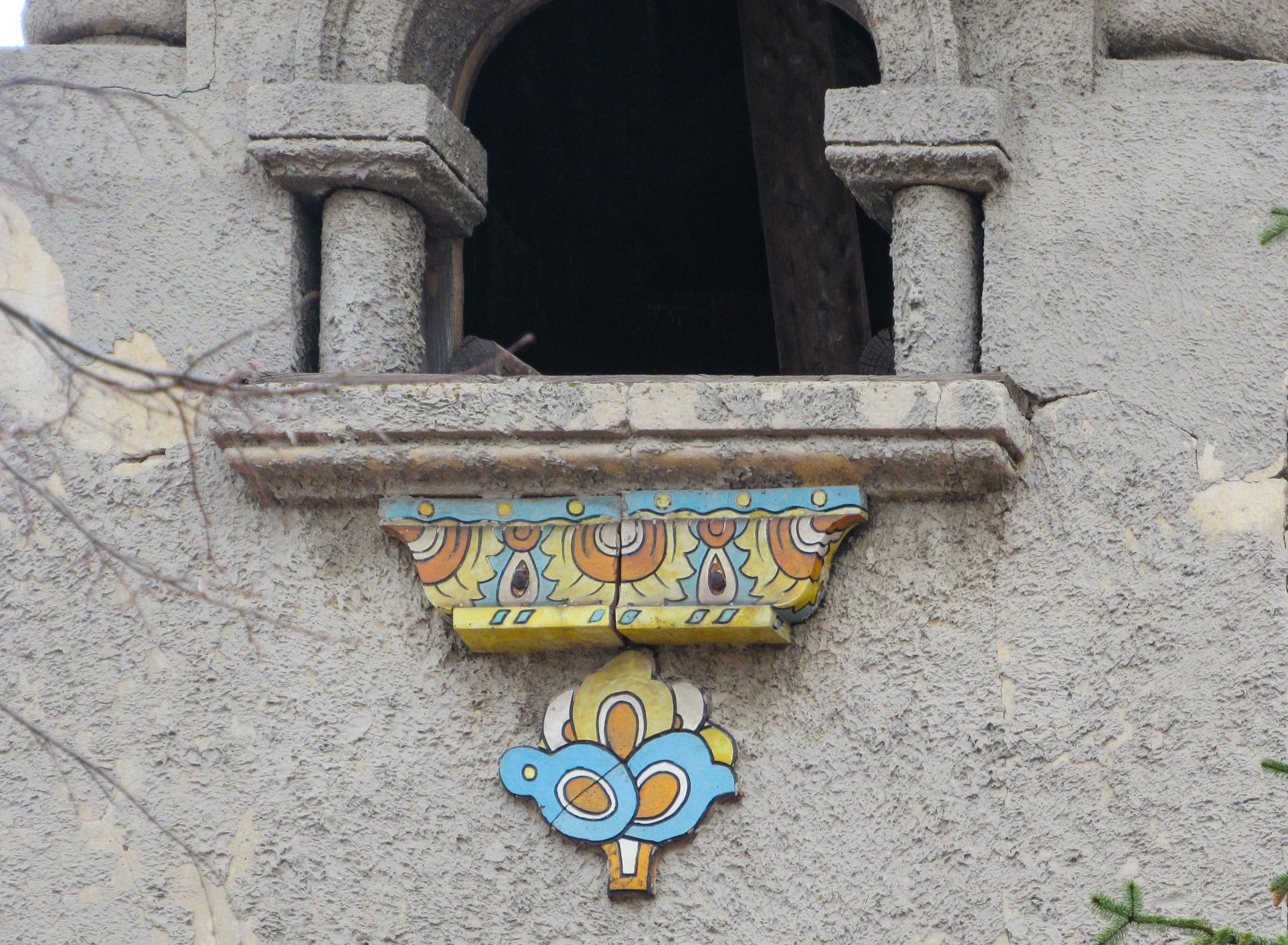
Tower detail

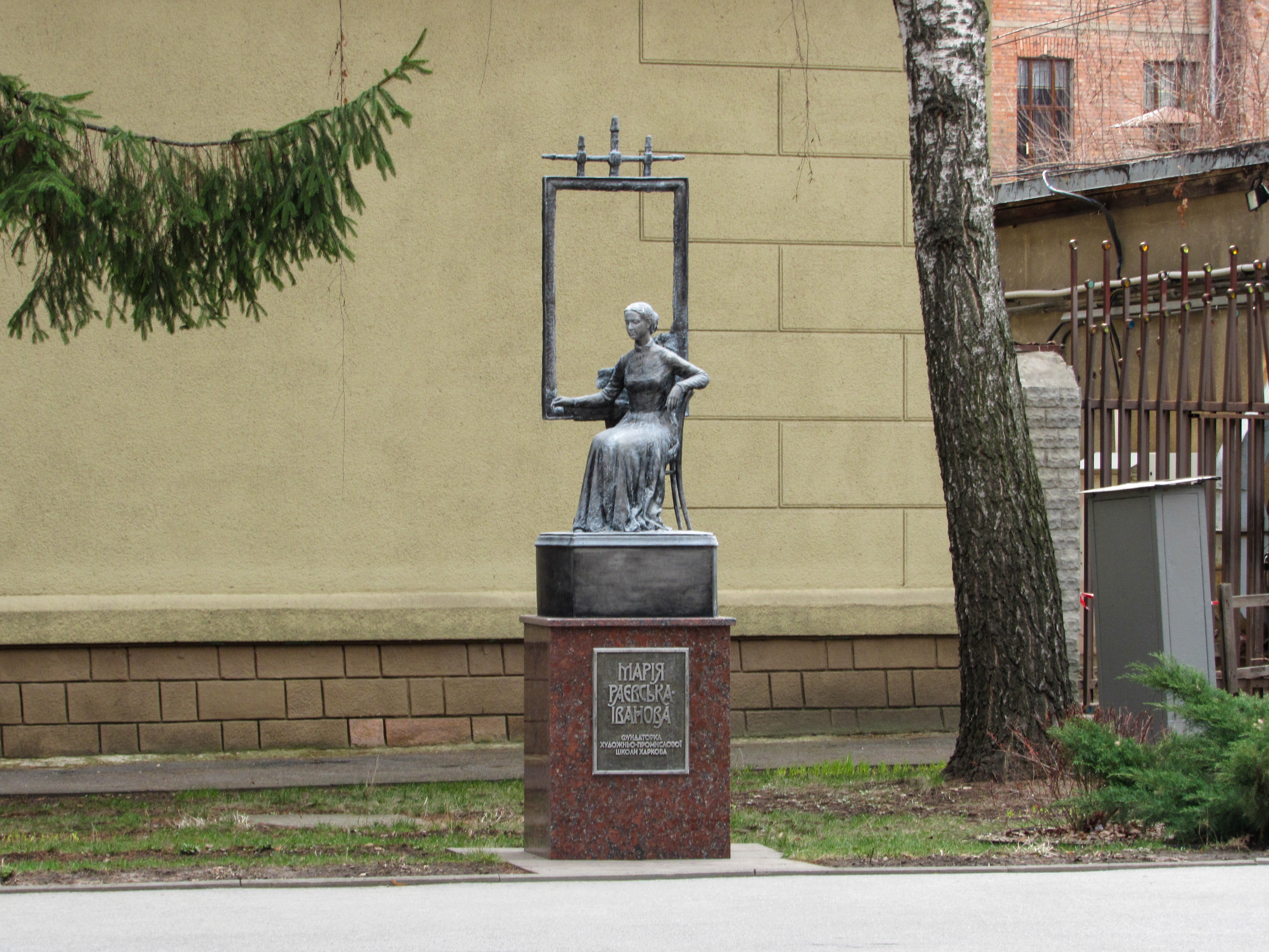
Monument to Mariia Raevska-Ivanova

== See also ==
- Maria Raevska-Ivanova
- Kharkiv State School of Art
- Kharkiv State Academy of Design and Arts
