= Kokel =

Kokel may refer to:

- Aleksey Kokel, a Chuvash painter
- German name of Târnava River
- Kokel, a settlement in the administrative unit Kodovjat, Albania
