= Pervukhin =

Pervukhin (Russian: Перву́хин), female form Pervukhina (Russian: Перву́хина) is a Russian surname.

Notable people with this surname include:

- Ilya Pervukhin (born 1991), Russian canoeist
- Konstantin Pervukhin (1863–1915), Russian painter
- Mikhail Pervukhin (1904–1978), Soviet official
- Vasili Pervukhin (born 1956), Russian ice hockey player
