= Kharkiv State Academy of Design and Arts =

Art school in Kharkiv, Ukraine

Kharkiv State Academy of Design and Fine Arts
- Харківська державна академія дизайну та мистецтв
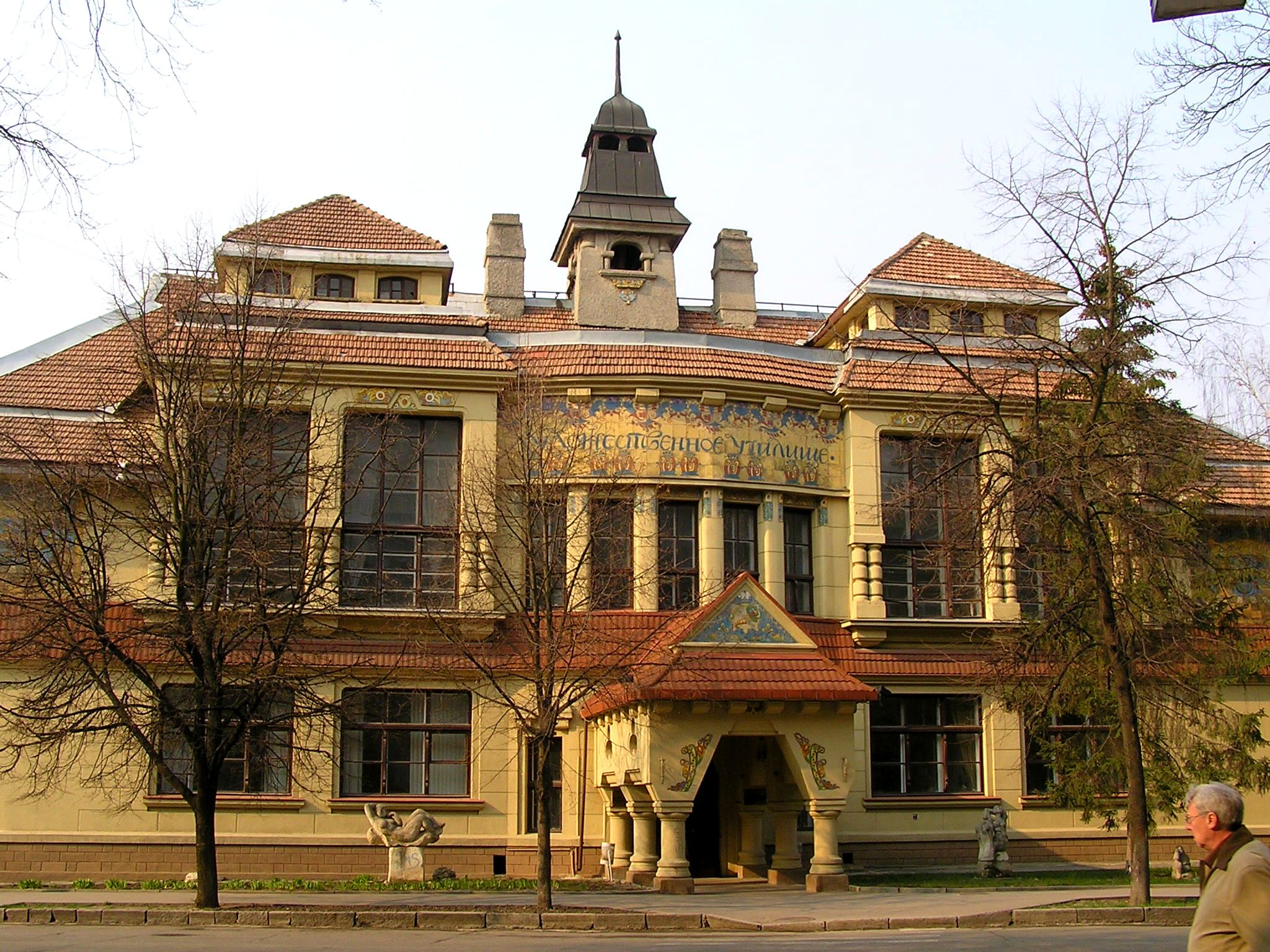
- Main Kharkiv Art School building
- Other name: KSADA
- Type: Public
- Established: 1921; 105 years ago
- Accreditation: Ministry of Education and Science of Ukraine
- Rector: Oleksandr Soboliev
- Students: ~1450
- Location: Kharkiv, Ukraine; 49°59′58″N 36°14′44″E
- Campus: urban
- Colors
- Website: ksada.org

Immovable Monument of Local Significance of Ukraine
- Official name: «Художньо-промисловий інститут» (Art and Industrial Institute)
- Type: Urban Planning, Architecture
- Reference no.: 7228-Ха

The Kharkiv State Academy of Design and Arts (Ukrainian: Харківська державна академія дизайну та мистецтв, romanized: Kharkivska derzhavna akademiia dyzainu ta mystetstv) or KSADA (ХДАДМ) is a Kharkiv-based state institution of higher education in design, visual arts, and culture. Located in Kharkiv, the academy is overseen by the Ministry of Culture of Ukraine, and currently hosts approximately 1,450 students, including international students.

Established in 1921, with roots dating back to 1869, the academy combines academic tradition with modern approaches to creativity, education, and research. KSADA's curriculum supports interdisciplinary learning, and fosters both artistic expression and practical skills that support Bachelor's, Master's, and PhD programs across a wide range of disciplines, including graphic design, industrial and environmental design, multimedia, clothing and footwear design, fine arts, sculpture, painting, architecture, restoration and art expertise, animation, photography, visual communications, and cultural studies.

KSADA is part of the global public-private network Research4Life and the global community-led Research Organization Registry (ROR). It is also a member of the European League of Institutes of Art (ELIA), the Cumulus Association, and Erasmus+. It also has creative, educational, and scientific ties with higher education institutions in Poland, Sweden, Finland, Italy, Latvia, Turkey, Estonia, Slovenia, Lithuania, Germany, and Hungary.

== Recognitions ==
In recent years, KASADA has been honored with multiple institutional recognitions, including:

- The Gold Medal from the National Academy of Arts of Ukraine for significant creative achievements;
- The Certificate of Honor from the Kharkiv Regional State Administration for conscientious work, significant contribution to the development of Ukrainian design and art, and the training of highly qualified specialists;
- The Diploma of the Public Action Flagships of Education and Science of Ukraine for a significant contribution to the development of the image of education and science of Ukraine; and
- The Diploma Leader of the national rating system of higher educational institutions of Ukraine, in addition to many other awards

KSADA's faculty has likewise been similarly honored. Currently, there are approximately 200 professors and teachers who carry out educational, methodical, scientific, and artistic work at the academy. They include: folk artists, Shevchenko National Prize-winners, Honored Art Workers, Honored Artists, Honored Architects of Ukraine, Academicians and Corresponding members of the National Academy of Arts of Ukraine. The vast majority of professors and teaching staff are members of the National Union of Artists of Ukraine, the Union of Designers of Ukraine, and the Union of Architects of Ukraine. Most are Doctors of Philosophy (PhDs), Doctor of Arts (DA), or Doctor of Sciences (DSc). Most also hold the title of Professor or associate professor.

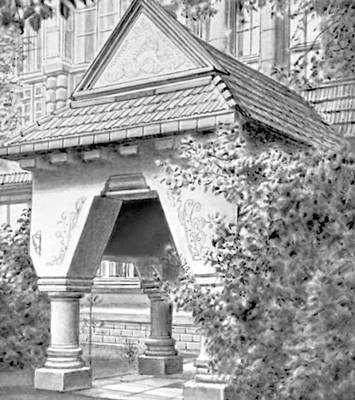
Photo of the Academy entrance, 1913. Credit: K. M. Zhukov, Great Soviet Encyclopedia.

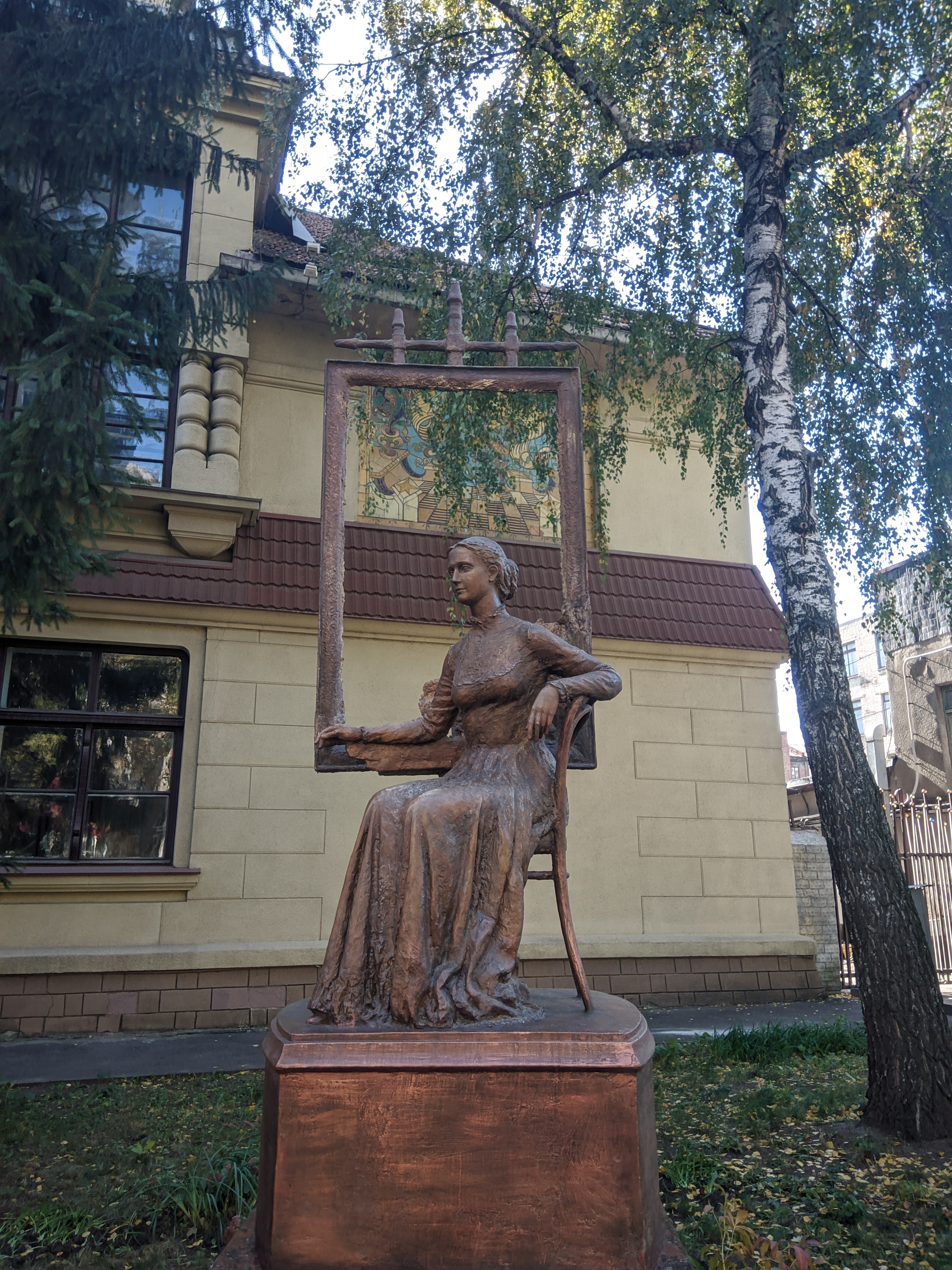
Monument to the Academy's identity as the Institute of Art and Industry. Credit: Михайло Тітаренко Олександрович.

== Institutional resources ==
=== Campus infrastructure ===
The academy has three educational and laboratory buildings, more than 20 laboratories and educational workshops, a computer technology center, a library that houses more than 140,000 volumes, a museum, a student theater publicist, a student fashion theater, a dormitory, and more. The academy has also created preparatory courses and a children's studio of fine arts and design.

=== HUDPROM: The Ukrainian Art and Design Journal ===
Founded in 1999, as Bulletin of KSADA, the academic research journal was updated, along with its publishing structure, in 2023. Now known as HUDPROM: The Ukrainian Art and Design Journal, which has been evaluated by the Ministry of Science and Higher Education of Poland, and is included among the list of the world's leading journals, describes itself as:

[A] peer-reviewed academic publication that features original research in the theory, history, and practice of fine arts, design, decorative arts, illustration, painting, architecture, and related visual disciplines. The aim of the journal is to provide a platform for scholarly communication among researchers, educators, artists, and theorists engaged in the analysis of artistic phenomena in both contemporary and historical contexts.

=== 4th Block Poster Museum ===
The 4th Block Poster Museum, the third-largest in the world after the Warsaw and New York museums, was opened in 2019. The uniqueness of the museum institution lies in the harmonious combination of the archive, museum, exhibition space, and research laboratory. The World Environmental Poster Collection includes more than 10,000 works from 56 countries and is a platform for international scientific research.

=== Library ===
As of 2018, the library's collection houses over 146,000 copies, and includes books published in the 19th and early 20th centuries, as well as volumes supplemented with literature in KSADA's academic specialties: fine arts, industrial design, decorative and applied arts, and other literature related to the educational process.

The library currently has four reading rooms and a subscription. In the reading room of scientific and educational literature, a space is organized to showcase the works of academy teachers and students.

=== Signature events ===
KSADA sponsors numerous cultural and artistic events. The academy, in particular, is proud of the artistic events initiated by its students, the most significant of which are the International Forum Design-Education, the International Triennial 4th Block, the annual All-Ukrainian Student Design Olympiad, the ArtStreetFest festival, and the annual International Font Celebration.

== History ==
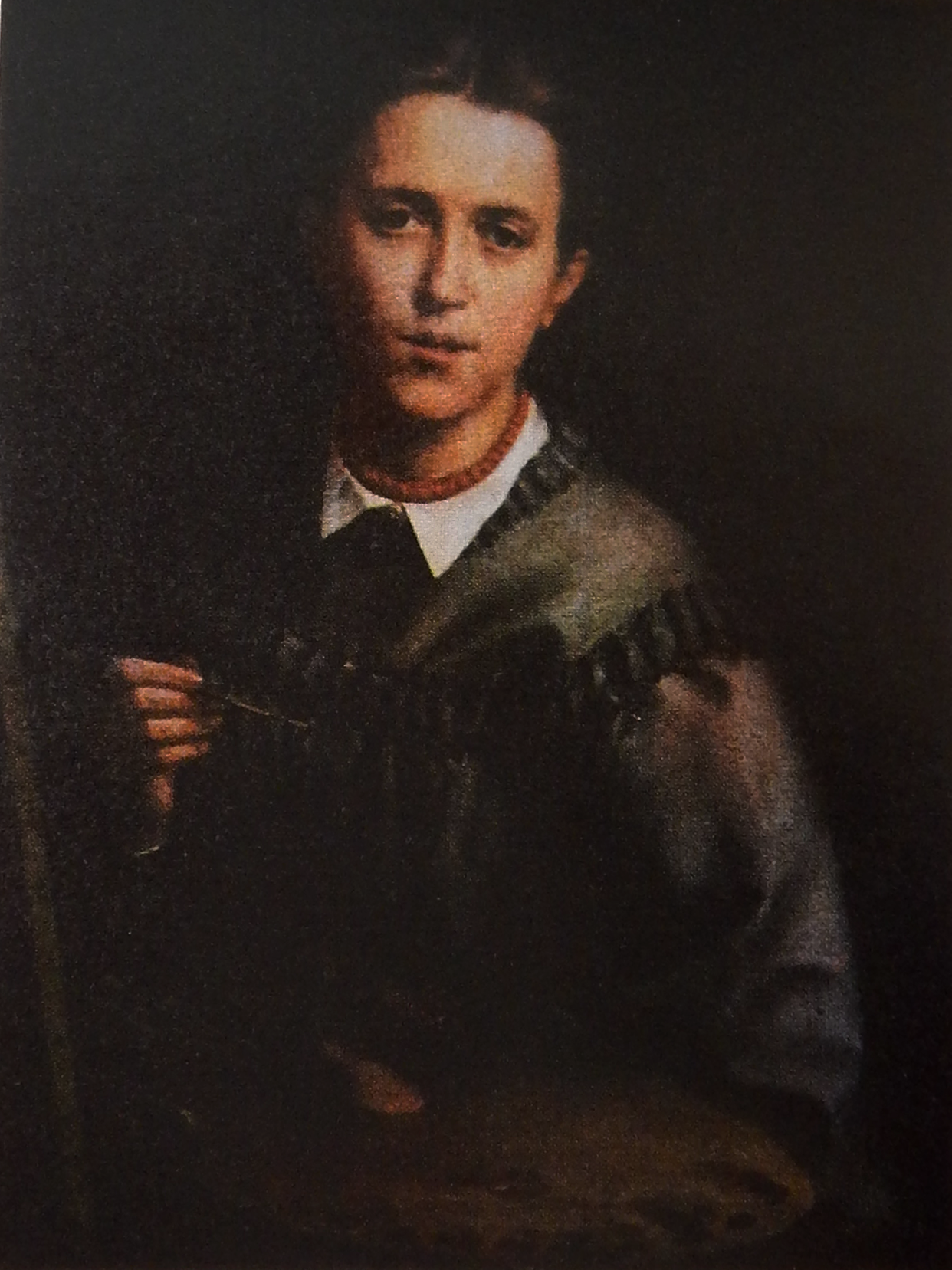
Maria Raevskaia-Ivanova (1840–1912), in a 1868 self-portrait, founded a drawing school in 1869 that evolved into KSADA.

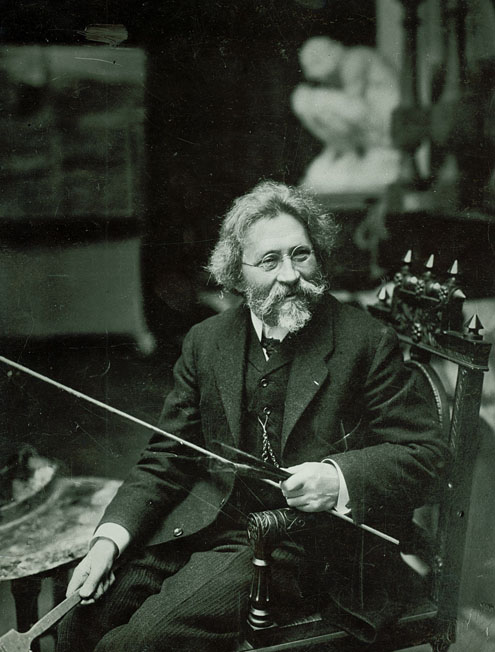
Former students of renowned realist painter Ilya Repin, pictured in 1909, influenced the early direction of the Academy.

=== Mid-1800s ===
In 1869, in response to the ever-increasing need for professional artists, Maria Raevska-Ivanova opened a drawing school in Kharkiv as an independent specialized educational institution. The student body included several painters and architects of note, including artist Serhiy Vasylkivskyi, painter Mykhailo Tkachenko, architect-academician Alexi Beketov, and many others. Over time, the school developed in both artistic and industrial ways that subsequently led to the creation of higher design education in Kharkiv.

In 1896, the formerly school was transformed into a public city art school, with several former pupils serving as teachers. In 1912, the St. Petersburg Academy of Arts was moved to oversee the school. The Ukrainian-born painter Ilya Repin who had studied in St. Petersburg, recommended his former student O. Lyubimov as director, and O. Tytov, S. Prokhorov, H. Gorelov, and O. Kokel serving as teachers.

=== 1900–1949 ===
In 1921–1922, Ilya Repin and Dmitry Kardovsky's former student Oleksii Kokel was named the first rector of Kharkiv Art Technical School, and Kokel remained with the school as a professor in the Department of Painting until he died in 1956.

Sculptor Bernard Kratko became the second rector in 1922–1925. In 1925–1927, he was followed by famed landscape painter Mykola Burachek. The fourth rector, A. Komashko, was another of Ilya Repin's students. He served between 1927 and 1932. Between 1925 and 1934, painter and writer Ivan Padalka taught at KSADA. A victim of the Executed Renaissance, he was murdered in 1937.

In 1932–1934, the new rector was artist and party functionary, P. Kryven, known for his uncompromising attitude to avant-garde trends in Ukrainian art, and to the "Boichukist" school, in particular. From 1934 to 1941, the school was managed by the art critic I. August, who died during World War II.

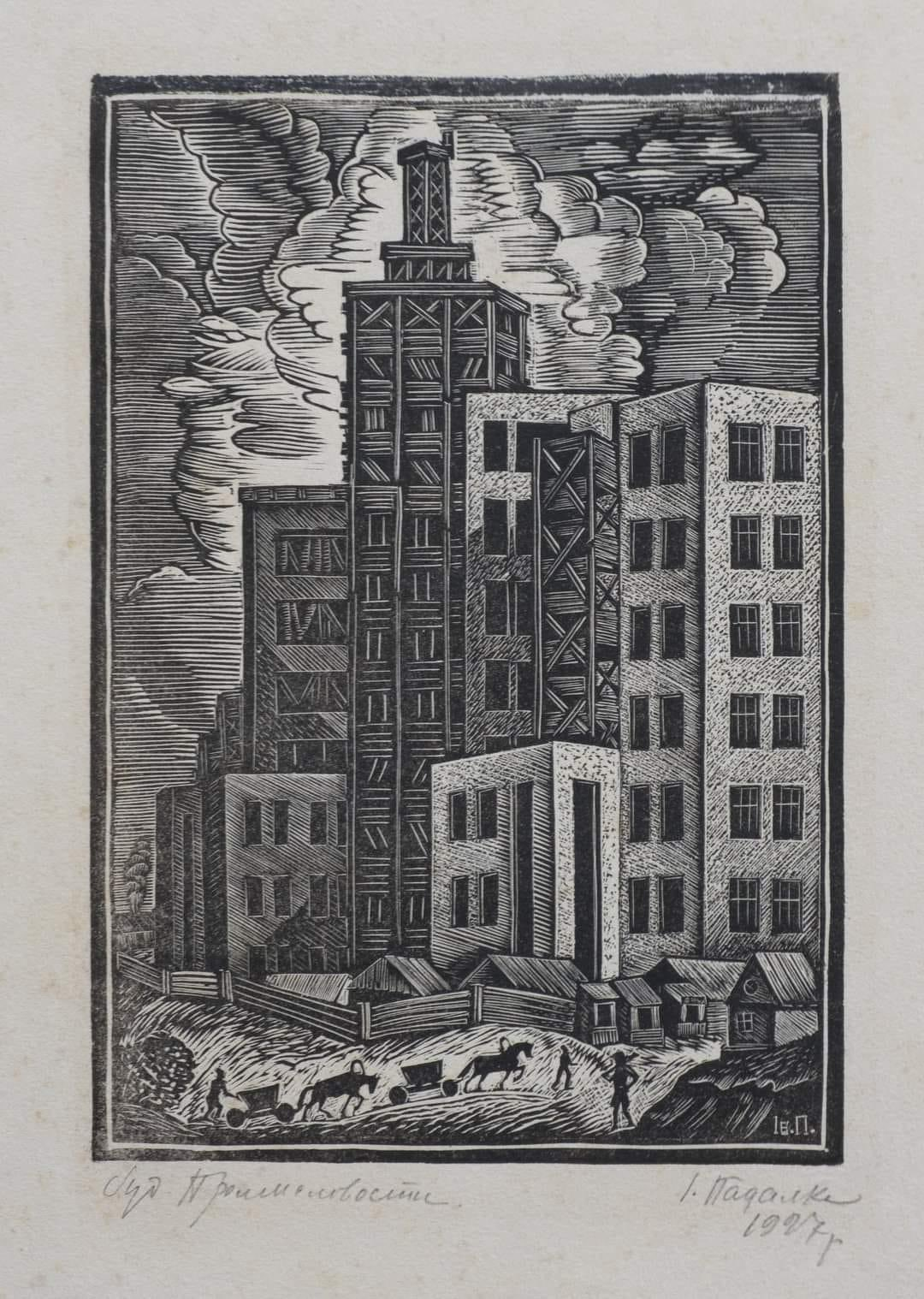
Ivan Padalka taught at KSADA from 1925 to 1934. One of the Executed Renaissance, Padalka was murdered in 1937. He drew the Derzhprom Building in 1927. Now a UNESCO heritage building, it was a symbol of modernity then.

The academy resumed its activities after the liberation of Kharkiv from Nazi invaders in 1943. Slowly, former students who had been mobilized to the front or evacuated to Samarkand (Uzbekistan) began to return to the school.

=== 1950–2000 ===
Post-war, the academy was successively headed by: Professor S. Besedin (1943–1948), Associate Professor M. Shaposhnikov (1948–1972), Professor Ye. Yegorov (1972–1985), Professor V. Torkatyuk (1985–1998); Academician V. Danylenko (1999–2020). Professor Oleksandr Sobolev has served as rector since 2021.

In 1963, Kharkiv State Art Institute was reorganized into the Kharkiv Art and Industrial Institute and reoriented to train art and industrial specialists. Artists M. Shaposhnikov, Ye. Yegorov, V. Seleznyov, V. Bilyk, L. Vynokurov, V. Konstantinov, V. Listrovyi, Z. Yudkevich, Yu. Starostenko and others made significant contributions to the reorganization of the institute and the provision of training in new specialties. At the same time, new departments were created, including the Design and Interior Decoration of Buildings, and Industrial Graphics and Packaging, which was later acclaimed for its innovation.

In 2001, KSADA earned the 4th level accreditation for excellence on the basis of the Kharkiv Art and Industrial Institute.

== Notable alumni ==
By the Numbers
Total	Honor
3	People's Artists of Ukraine
2	People's Architects of the USSR
35	People's Artists of Ukraine, Russia, Kazakhstan, and Uzbekistan
50	Merited Artists of Ukraine, Russia, Azerbaijan, Uzbekistan, Tatarstan
10	Honored Artists of the Commonwealth of Independent States (CIS) in Eurasia
9	Laureates of State Awards

=== V. Agibalov ===
Sculptor. People's Artist of Ukraine (1978). Laureate of the Shevchenko National Prize (1977). Graduate of Kharkiv Art School and Kharkiv State Art Institute (1933–1941). Teachers: L. Bloch, M. Gelman, and O. Matveev. Professor of Sculpture, Kharkiv State Art Institute (1949–1954).

=== V. Gontariv ===
Monumental art maker. Painter. Honored Artist of Ukraine (1996). Full member, National Academy of Arts of Ukraine. Representative for the pedagogical branch of the National Academy of Arts. Graduate of the Kharkiv Art School (1963) and the Leningrad Higher Art and Industrial School named after V. Mukhina (1972). Head of the educational and creative workshop of monumental painting of the academy (1999–). First Prize winner for an easel painting at the All-Ukrainian Exhibition: Competition of Paintings (1998). Laureate of Shevchenko National Prize (2009).

=== O. Khmelnytskyi ===
Professor (1978). People's Artist of Ukraine (1984). Сorresponding Мember, National Academy of Arts of Ukraine (1997). Teachers: O. Lyubimskyi, M. Rybalchenko, P. Kotov, L. Chernov, and M. Shaposhnikov (1947–1953). Awarded Silver Medal from the Academy of Sciences of the Soviet Union (1975) for the painting For the Sake of Life on Earth.

=== V. Khristenko ===
Graphic designer. Laureate of the 2020 Repin Prize for the etchings Cossack Crosses.

=== B. Kosarev ===
Professor. Laureate of the USSR State Prize (1947). Headed the theatre and art workshop of Kharkiv State Art Institute. State award winner for the scenography and costumes for the play Yaroslav the Wise by I. Kocherga, directed by M. Krushelnytskyi at the Taras Shevchenko Kharkiv Academic Ukrainian Drama Theatre.

=== V. Kovtun ===
Painter. Honored Artist of Ukraine (1995). People's Artist of Ukraine (2002). Full member, International Academy of Informatization at the United Nations (1998). Academician. Head of the plot-thematic painting workshop of the Painting Department, Academy of Fine Arts of Ukraine (2001). Graduate of the Kharkiv State School of Art (1977) and Kharkiv Art and Industrial Institute (1984). Teachers: O. Konstantinopolskyi, O. Khmelnytskyi, E. Yehorov, and L. Chernov. Head of the National Union of Artists of Ukraine, Kharkiv. Shevchenko National Prize for the series of paintings My Land — Slobozhanshchyna (2010).

=== A. Nasedkin ===
Master of painting and graphics. People's Artist of Ukraine (1974). Shevchenko National Prize (1977). Teacher: M. Deregus, Kharkiv State Art Institute (1945–1951).

=== V. Sydorenko ===
Professor (2002). Art History PhD candidate (2005). Honored Artist of Ukraine (1992). Academician, National Academy of Arts of Ukraine (1997). People's Artist of Ukraine (1998). Vice-president, National Academy of Arts of Ukraine. Graduate of Kharkiv Art and Industrial Institute (1979). Taught at Kharkiv Art and Industrial Institute (1979–1985 and 1989–1992). Head of the Research Institute of Contemporary Art, National Academy of Arts of Ukraine in Kyiv (2001–). Ukraine Representative: 50th Venice Biennale with the project The Mill of Time (2003) and 52nd Venice Biennale with the project Poem about the Inner Sea (2007).

== Structure and Specialties ==
=== 022 Design ===
Bachelor's degree programs:

- Graphic Design,
- Clothing Design (shoes),
- Environment Design,
- Industrial Design,
- Multimedia Design

Master's degree programs:

- Innovative Design,
- Design of Visual Communications,
- Conceptual Design,
- Art Therapy and Communicative Practices,
- Design of the Architectural and Landscape Environment.

=== 023 Fine Art, Decorative Art, Restoration ===
Bachelor's degree programs:

- Graphics,
- Street Art and Monumental Art,
- Easel Painting,
- Easel and Monumental Sculpture,
- Restoration and Examination of Works of Art,
- Art History;

Master's degree programs:

- Easel Painting,
- Modern Visual Practices,
- Art History,
- Graphic Practices,
- Creative Drawing.

=== 191 Architecture and Urban Planning ===
Bachelor's degree programs:

- Architectural and Landscape Environment.

=== 021 Audiovisual Art and Production ===
Bachelor's degree programs:

- Advertising and Video Art,
- Photo Art and Visual Practices,
- Production and Art Curation,
- Event Directing

Master's degree programs:

- Animation and Video Art

=== 022 Design ===
Doctor of Philosophy educational and scientific programs:

- Design

=== 023 Fine Art, Decorative Art, Restoration ===
Doctor of Philosophy educational and scientific programs:

- Fine Art, Decorative Art, Restoration

=== 021 Audiovisual Art and Production ===
Doctor of Philosophy educational and scientific programs:

- Audiovisual Arts and Production

== See also ==
- Kharkiv State School of Art
- Kharkiv State Academy of Culture
- Building of the Kharkiv Art School
- List of universities in Ukraine
