= Aleksey Kokel =

Chuvash painter (1880–1956)

- Born: 1 March 1880; Tarkhany village, Simbirsk Governorate, Russian Empire (now Batyrevsky District, Chuvashia), Russia
- Died: 4 February 1956 (aged 75); Kharkiv, Ukraine
- Education: Petersburg Academy of Arts, Imperial Academy of Arts
- Known for: Painting
- Notable work: In The Tea Room (1912)

Aleksey Afanasyevich Kokel (1 March 1880 – 4 February 1956) was a Chuvash painter who rose to prominence in Russia and Ukraine during the pre-Soviet and Soviet eras.

== Biography ==
Aleksey Kokel was born into a large family in Tarkhany, Simbirsk Governorate, Russian Empire (now Batyrevsky District, Chuvash Republic). His love for fine art began early on. Aleksey would paint different scenes on slate such as local wildlife, his village, or the local church, and would copy illustrations from his school textbooks. In his later youth, he followed his brother's path by attending Simbirsk Chuvash teacher's school. However, he was unable to graduate due to contracting a skeletal form of tuberculosis. In 1902–1903, after many years of treatment, he attended the Drawing School at the Academy of Arts in St. Petersburg. He would then go on to attend the Imperial Academy of Arts in 1904, where he was able to work under Savitsky, Zaleman, and Tsioglinsky. In 1905, he elected to change his name from Afanasiev to Kokel.

After publishing his diploma work "In The Tea Room" (1912), he was awarded a trip to Italy where his work was displayed at international exhibitions in Munich and Venice. From 1916 onward, Alexei lived and worked in Ukraine and participated in the development of higher art education. He taught at Kharkiv Art College (1916–1921) and the Kharkiv Art Institute (1921–1936). He died in 1956 and was buried in Kharkiv.

== Major works ==
"In The Tea Room" (1912), "Family Portrait" (1914), "On Guard" (1927), "Awarding of shock troops" (1930), "Educational program" (1935), "Cooperative Market" (1936) Self-Portrait (1939), "Winter" (1943).

Kokel’s collection is located in the Chuvash State Art Museum. It features:

- "Portrait of the Chuvash Women" (1906)
- "Ural Plants" (1908)
- "In the Tea Room" (1912)
- "Italians" (1913)
- "Family Portrait" (1914)
- "From the Chuvash Suite" (1919)
- "The Driver" (1919)
- "Wedding. Chuvashia "(1920)
- "Old Worker" (1927)
- "On Guard" (1927)
- "Rewarding shock troops" (1930)
- "Cooperative Market" (1934)
- "Likbez" (1935)
- "At the Salt Mines" (1936)
- "Winter" (1943)
- "Donets" (1955)

== Literature ==
- Выставка произведений профессора Алексея Афанасьевича Кокеля (1980–1956). Каталог. На украинском и русском яз. Харьков, 1960. Составители Ю.Ф. Дюженко, А.А. Кокель. На обл.: О.О. Кокель.
- Алексей Афанасьевич Кокель: Воспоминания современников и учеников. — Чебоксары: Чуваш. кн. изд-во, 1980.- 104 с.
- Кокель А. А. Алексей Афанасьевич Кокель: Выст. произведений, посвящ. 100-летию со дня рождения худож.: Каталог / А. А. Кокель.- Чебоксары; Киев; Харьков, 1980. — 30 с.
- Садюков Н. И. Алексей Афанасьевич Кокель (к 125-летию со дня рождения) // Халӑх шкулĕ=Народная школа. — 2004. — no. 6.
- Кушманов Н. Кокель: Поэма. — Чебоксары: Чуваш. кн. изд-во, 1992. — 128 с.
- Арская, И.И. Кокель (Афанасьев, Афанасьев-Кокель) Алексей Афанасьевич // Энциклопедия русского авангарда. Изобразительное искусство. Архитектура. В 3 тт. Т. 1. А-К. Биографии. Авторы-сост. Р.И. Ракитин, А.Д. Сарабьянов. М., 2013. С. 430–431.
