= Dmytro Bezperchy =

Ukrainian painter

- Дмитрий Безперчий
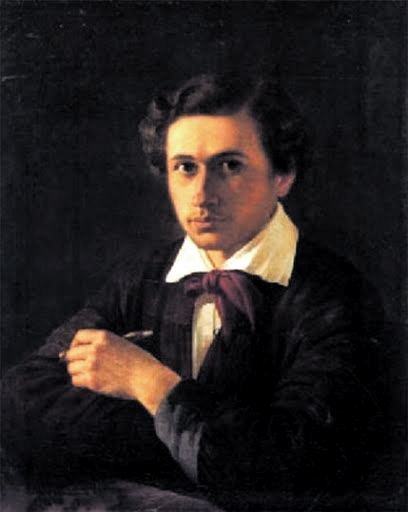
- Self-portrait (1846)
- Born: 30 October 1825; Borisovka, Borisovsky District, Belgorod Oblast, Russian Empire, now Russia
- Died: 30 September 1913 (aged 87); Kharkiv, Russian Empire
- Known for: Portraits, Illustrations
- Movement: Academic art

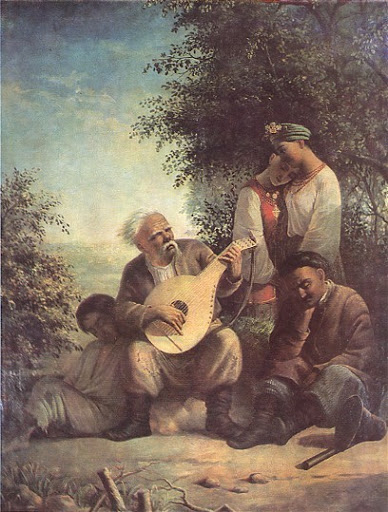
The Bandurist

Dmytro Bezperchy (Russian: Дмитрий Иванович Безперчий; 30 October 1825, Borisovka — 30 September 1913, Kharkiv) was a Ukrainian genre painter in the Academic style.

== Early life ==
He studied art in Saint Petersburg, from 1841 to 1846, at the Imperial Academy of Arts, and was employed in the workshops of Karl Bryullov after 1843. There, he met the poet, Taras Shevchenko, who had a strong influence on his thematic choices. Upon graduating, he was named a "Free Artist"

== Career ==
Initially known for his watercolors, he also created numerous oil paintings, some graphic works depicting the Haydamak (paramilitary fighters), and illustrations for Dead Souls by Nikolai Gogol. From the 1860s to the 1890s, he also engaged in religious work, decorating churches in Sloboda Ukraine and Crimea.

As a drawing teacher, he worked at the Nizhyn Lyceum, the Kharkiv gymnasium and the Realschule. Many of the best known names in Ukrainian and Polish art studied with him, including Henryk Siemiradzki, Serhii Vasylkivsky, Mykhailo Tkachenko, Petro Levchenko, Vladimir Aleksandrovich Beklemishev, Oleksandr Shevchenko, Konstantin Pervukhin, Oleksiy Beketov and Vladimir Tatlin.

== Legacy ==
His works may be seen at the Kharkiv Art Museum, the Nikanor Onatsky Regional Art Museum in Sumy, and the National Art Museum of Ukraine.

== See also ==
- List of Ukrainian painters

== Sources ==
- Ukrainian Soviet Encyclopedia. In 12 volumes / Ed. M. Bazhana, URE edition, 1974—1985.
- D. P. Gordeev, "Materials for the artistic chronicle of Kharkov", 1914.
- Shevchenko's Dictionary: in 2 volumes, Institute of Literature. Taras Shevchenko Academy of Sciences of the USSR. - Kyiv: Main edition of URE, 1978
