= Mikhail Pervukhin (writer) =

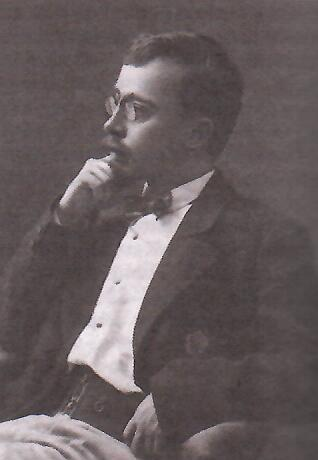
Mikhail Pervukhin

Mikhail Konstantinovich Pervukhin (17 September [O.S. 5 September] 1870 – 30 December 1928) was a Russian writer, journalist, editor and translator. A fairly well-known writer before the Bolshevik Revolution, Pervukhin was disregarded in the Soviet era, his works were reappreciated in the 1990s. He wrote over 20 fictional works and some non-fictional ones.

== Early life ==
Mikhail Pervukhin was born in Kharkov, to Konstantin Pavlovich Pervukhin, a district land survey official, and had a brother, painter Konstantin Pervukhin. After graduating from a real school, he enrolled to the university, from which he was expelled for political beliefs. He then worked for the Kursk-Sevastopol Railway. In 1899, due to tuberculosis, he moved to warmer Yalta in Crimea, where he met famed writers Anton Chekhov, Leo Tolstoy and Aleksandr Kuprin. In 1900–1906, Pervukhin edited the newspaper Krymski kuryer (Crimean Courier) and also wrote for the newspaper Odesskiye novosti (Odessa News).

== Writing career ==
In 1906, Pervukhin was exiled from Crimea for his revolutionary stance and labeled a "dangerous rebel". Pervukhin arrived to Berlin, where he began working as a correspondent for the Moscow newspaper Utro (Morning). There he wrote his first novels. In 1907, Pervukhin moved to Italy, where he lived in various places, including the island of Capri.

In 1917, Pervukhin wrote the alternate history novel The Second Life of Napoleon where the title character escapes from the island of Saint Helena and begins to influence the general development of world history, trying to establish a powerful empire in Africa. In 1924, his another alternate history novel, Pugachev the Winner about Yemelyan Pugachev, was published in Berlin.

Disillusioned with the Russian revolution, in 1918, Pervukhin wrote I Bolsceviki (The Bolsheviks), having opted for Italian rather than Russian language as he feared for his life. At the same time, he wanted to preserve the memories for future. Pervukhin's Italian language in some places resembled Russian which simplified translation. This was reflected in Pervukhin's strict use of punctuation and sentence structure, as well as in the literal renditions of Russian expressions and idioms.
