= Konstantin Pervukhin =

Russian painter

Konstantin Konstantinovich Pervukhin
- Константи́н Константи́нович Перву́хин
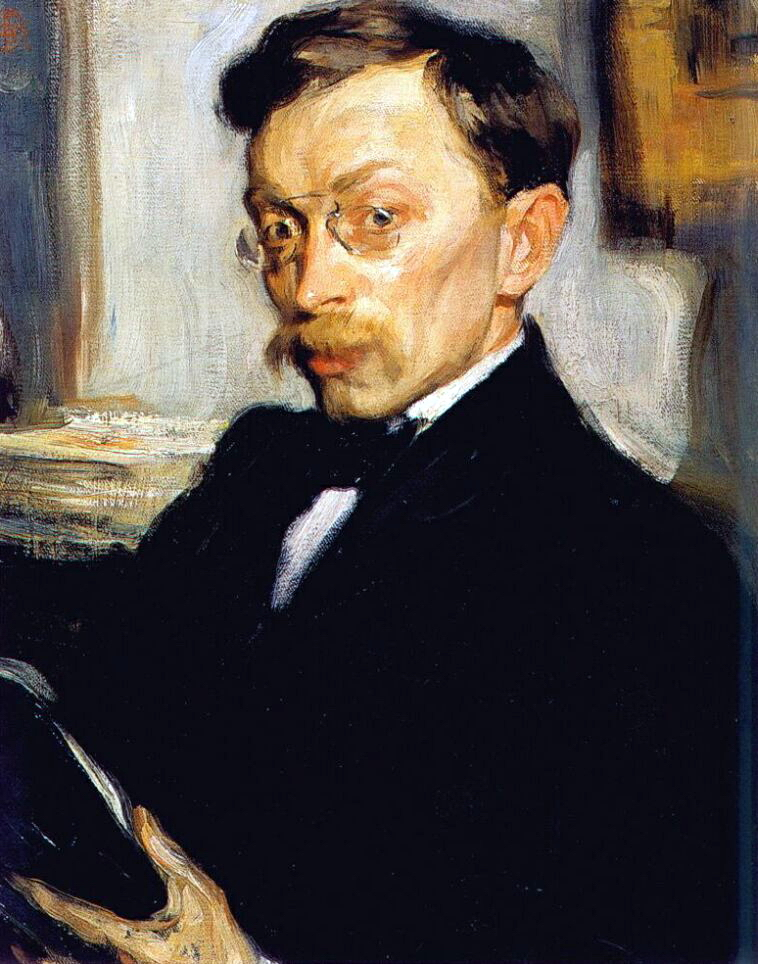
- Portrait by Osip Braz, 1902, oils; Russian Museum
- Born: 2 June 1863; Kharkov
- Died: 8 February 1915 (aged 51); Moscow
- Education: Kharkov School of Drawing
- Occupations: Impressionist landscape painter, writer, photographer

Konstantin Konstantinovich Pervukhin (Russian: Константи́н Константи́нович Перву́хин; 2 June 1863 – 8 February 1915) was a Ukrainian and Russian Impressionist landscape painter, writer and photographer; associated with the Peredvizhniki.

== Biography ==
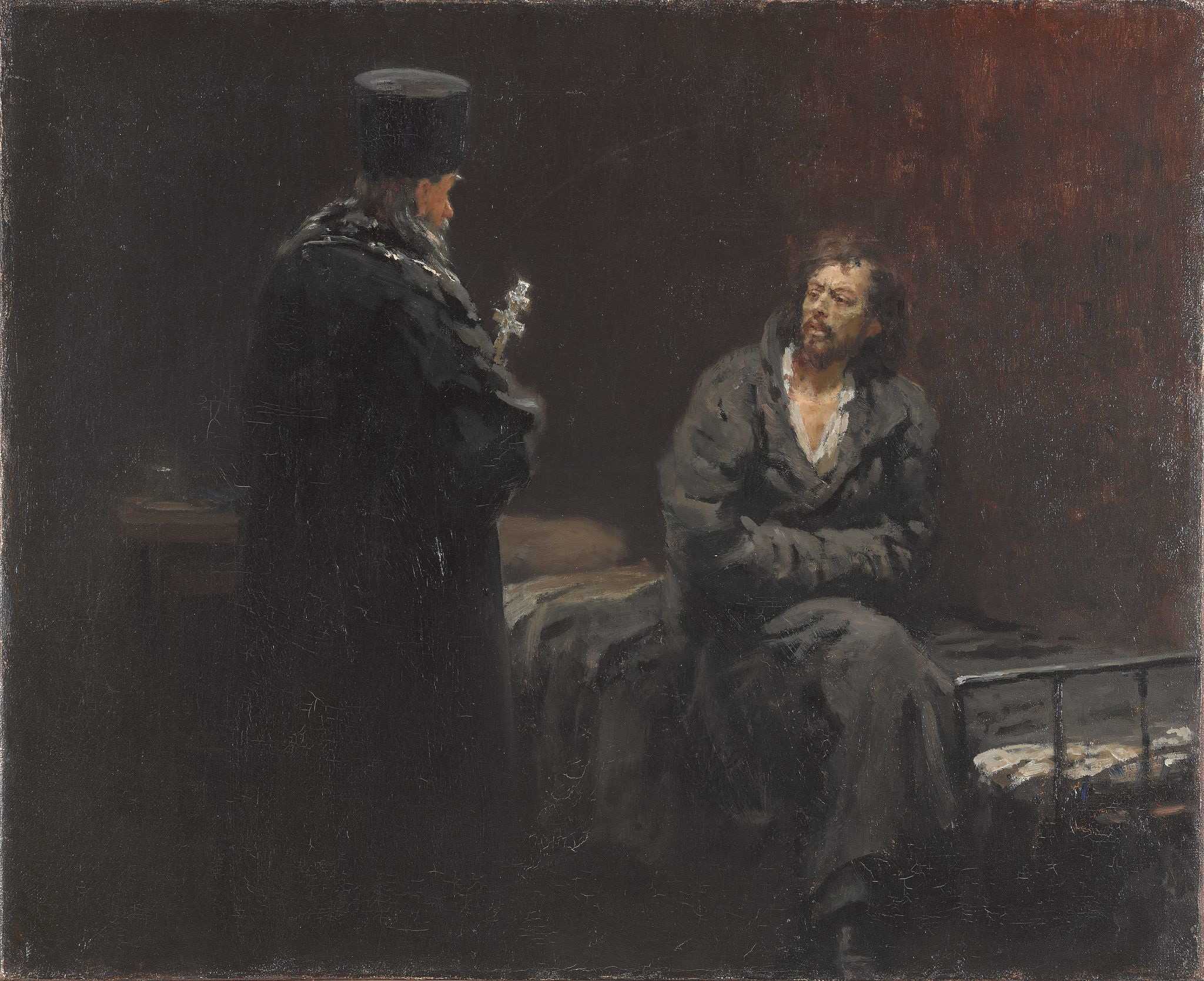
Konstantin Pervukhin in Ilya Repin's painting Before Confession (1885)

His father was a surveyor for the local government, while brother, Mikhail, became a writer. He began his art studies with the well-known Ukrainian pedagogue and artist, Dmytro Bezperchy. From 1884 to 1885, he studied at the "Kharkov School of Drawing" (now the "Kharkov State Academy of Design and Arts") with its founder, Maria Raevskaia-Ivanova.

After 1885, he lived in Saint Petersburg, where he took private lessons from Ilya Repin. From 1886 to 1887, he was an occasional student at the Imperial Academy of Arts and worked with Professor Pavel Chistyakov. That same year, he became a member of the Peredvizhniki and later had several paintings purchased by Pavel Tretyakov.

In 1902, he moved to Moscow and served as a teacher at the Stroganov Moscow State University of Arts and Industry until 1912. He resigned from the Peredvizhniki in 1903 and, together with Apollinary Vasnetsov, Abram Arkhipov, Alexei Stepanov, Ilya Ostroukhov and others, became one of the founders of the "Union of Russian Artists", which existed until 1923.

He also worked as an illustrator for periodicals such as the Ежегодник императорских театров (Yearbook of the Imperial Theaters), Живописное обозрение стран света (Pictorial View of the World) and Всемирная иллюстрация (Worldwide Illustration). In 1910, his photographs earned him a membership in the "Русское фотографическое обществорация" (Russian Photographic Society).

== Selected paintings ==
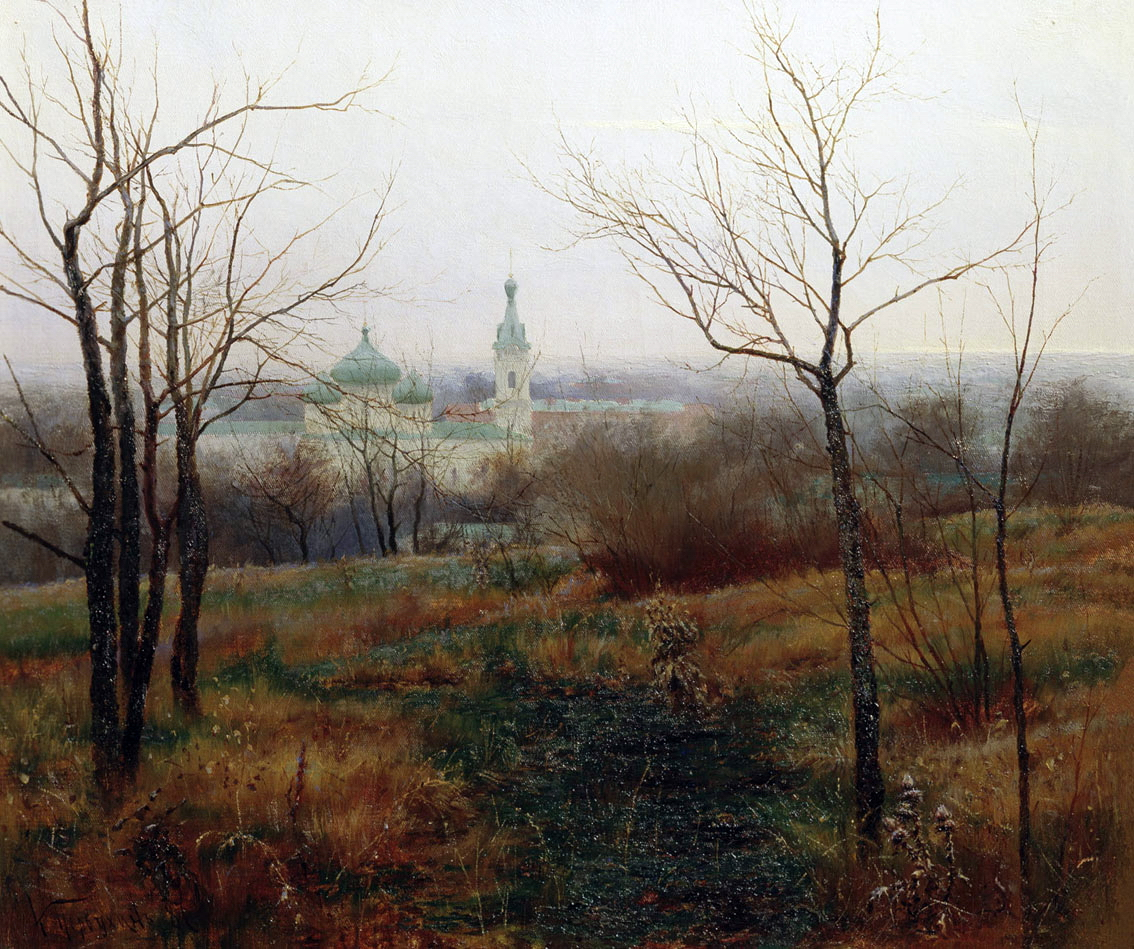
The End of Autumn

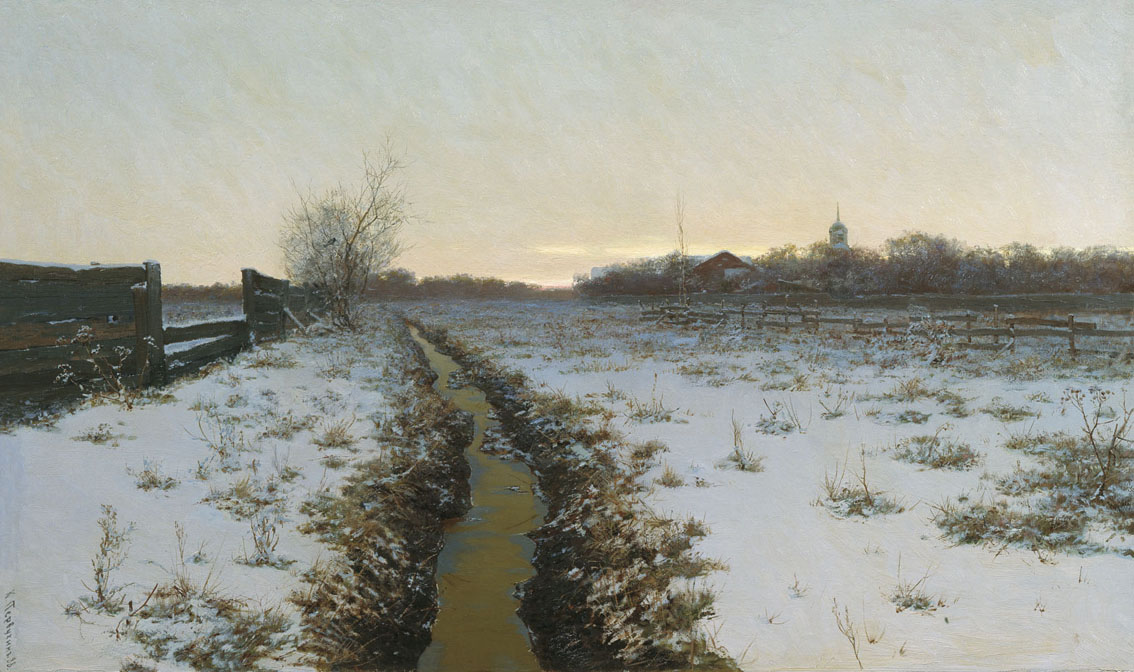
A Winter Night

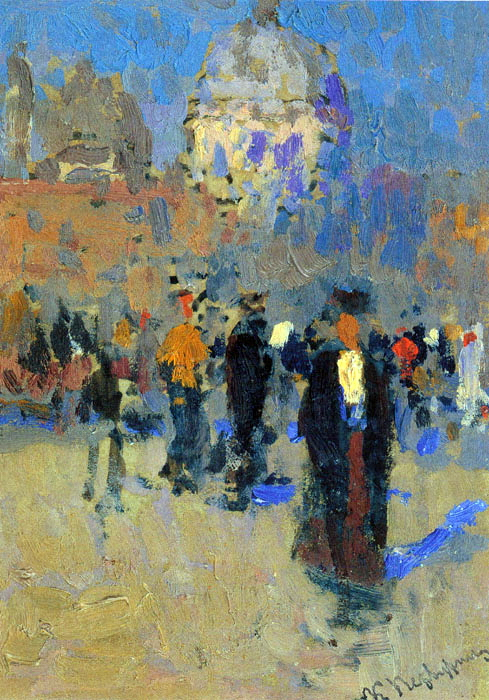
St. Mark's Square

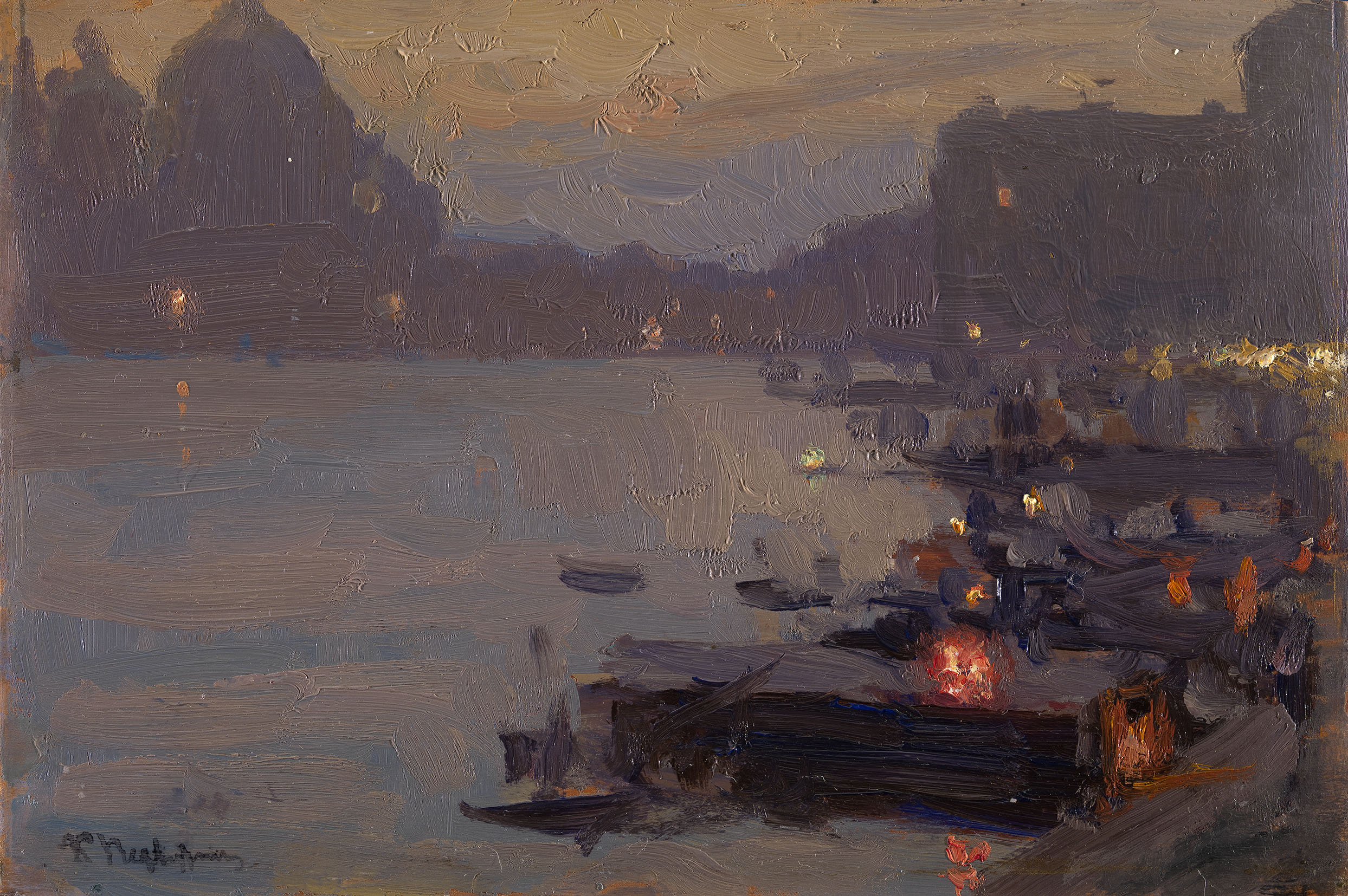
Evening in Venice
