= Salemann =

Salemann (Russian: Zaleman) is a surname. Notable people with the surname include:

- Carl Salemann (1850–1916), Russian Iranologist
- Hugo Salemann (1859–1919), Russian sculptor
