= Maria Raevska-Ivanova =

Ukrainian artist (1840–1912)

- Раєвська-Іванова Марія Дмитрівна
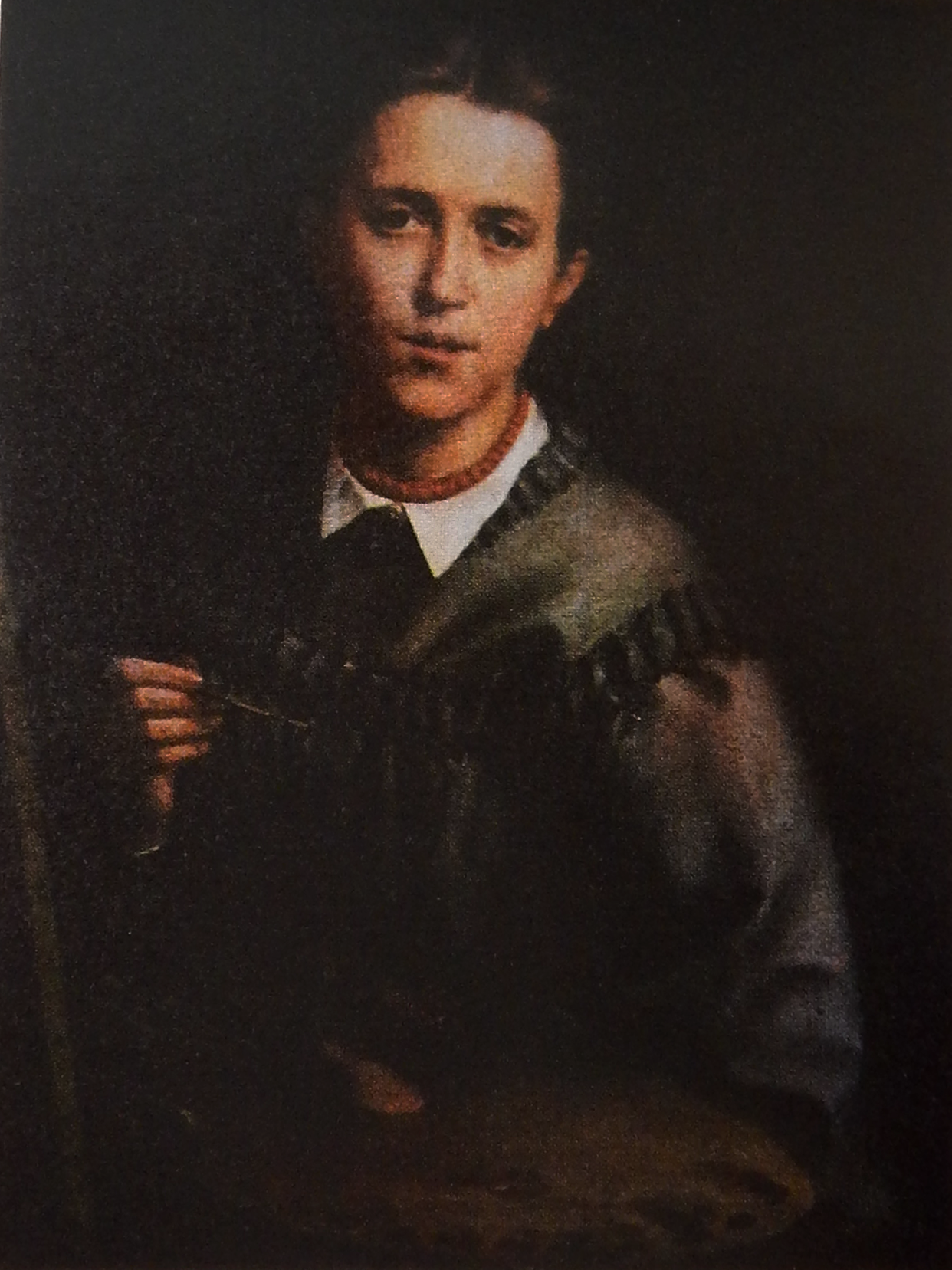
- Self-portrait (1866)
- Born: 20 July [O.S. 8 July] 1840; Havrylivka, Izyumsky Uyezd, Kharkov Governorate
- Died: 22 December [O.S. 9 December] 1912; Kharkiv
- Known for: Painter, art teacher, first woman in the Russian Empire awarded the title of "Free Artist"
- Spouse: Serhiy Oleksandrovych Raevsky

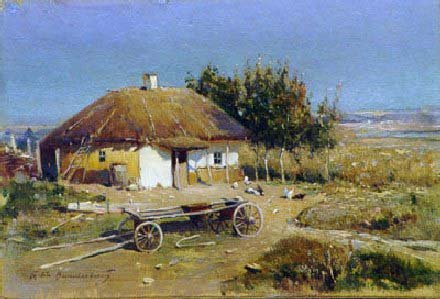
Rural Landscape (date unknown)

Maria Dmitriyvna Raevska-Ivanova (Ukrainian: Марія Дмитрівна Раєвська-Іванова; 20 July [O.S. 8 July] 1840, Havrylivka, Izyumsky Uyezd, Kharkov Governorate – 22 December [O.S. 9 December] 1912, in Kharkiv) was a Ukrainian painter and art teacher. In 1868 she became the first woman in the Russian Empire to be awarded the title of "Free Artist" by the Imperial Academy of Arts.

== Biography ==
Maria Dmytrivna Raevska-Ivanova was born 20 July [O.S. 8 July] 1840 into a landowner's family in the village of Havrylivka, Izyumsky Uyezd, Kharkov Governorate, which was founded by her grandfather Gavrilo Ivanov at the end of the 18th century. The family was engaged in and earned their living from agriculture. Her father, Dmytro Ivanov, followed in his grandfather's footsteps, becoming a military man. Since she could not get an education at the Imperial Academy of Arts (St. Petersburg; the only art educational institution in the Russian Empire at that time) because she was a woman, she studied at home and engaged in self-education. She then studied abroad in France and Italy for five years, attending courses in Italian on ethnology, archeology, art history, and linguistics in addition to regular art classes in Milan, Florence, the Sorbonne, and Prague. She studied in Dresden with professors Ludwig Erhardt and Anton Dietrich. She studied German language and literature.

Returning in 1868, she wanted to open her own art school where students of both sexes and all financial means could study. To do this, she passed the exam for "Free Artist" at the Imperial Academy and became the first such woman artist in the Russian Empire. In 1869, she returned to Kharkiv, she borrowed 500 rubles from her mother to organize art classes and publish their opening in Kharkiv newspapers. It is the first such educational institution in Ukraine and the third in the Russian Empire after the Moscow and St. Petersburg schools. The school taught painting, drawing, drafting, sculpture, porcelain painting, wood burning, leather embossing, and theatrical scenery painting. The school opened on February 21, 1869.

Since the opening of the school, the trustee of the Kharkiv educational district, active state councilor, founder of the city literacy society, craft school, one of the organizers of the People's House Serhiy Oleksandrovych Raevsky taught for free. The following year he married Maria, who took the surname of her and her husband Raevska-Ivanova. Together with her husband, they contributed to the founding of the Kharkiv Art and Industry Museum.

In 1872, Maria Raevska-Ivanova received the title of honorary member of the Academy for the innovative methods she used in her private workshop, which brought awards to her students at exhibitions.

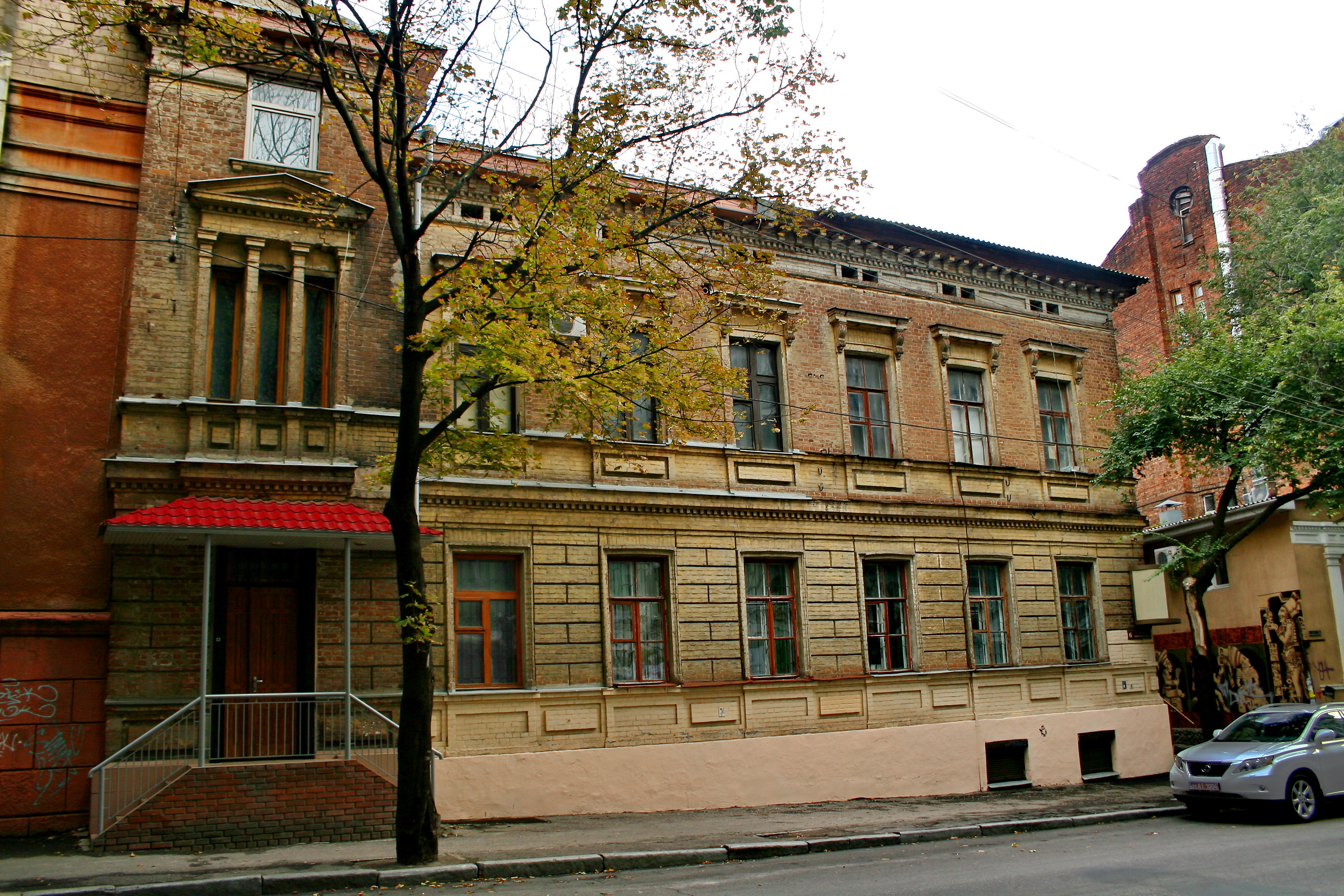
The building that housed the art school of Raevska-Ivanova from 1877 to 1896

In 1877, in the city center at 8 Chernyshevska Street, a new two-story building for the school was built at the expense of the family, designed by architect Boleslav Mykhailovsky. It has survived to this day and is a historical monument of local significance of Ukraine (security number 3311-Ха). Because the school was charitable, students studied for free, and only a few wealthy families paid 12 rubles, the school was constantly plagued by financial problems. In the 1880s, the Kharkiv City Council began to allocate 200 rubles annually to the school, which covered only a small part of the expenses.

The school she created operated for twenty-seven years and taught about 900 students, including Serhii Vasylkivsky, Oleksiy Beketov, Henryk Siemiradzki, Vladimir Beklemishev, Vasyl Yermylov, Kostyantyn Pervukhin and many others. At the All-Russian Exhibition of Drawing Schools, it surpassed the much more prestigious Stroganov School.

In the early 1890s, Maria Raevska-Ivanova began to lose her sight and could no longer run the school or teach in it. In September 1896, the school became a public educational institution run by the city. It was called "Kharkiv School of Fine Arts" and was located in the art museum. The City Duma unanimously adopted Maria Raevska-Ivanova to the title of Honorary Trustee of the Kharkiv City Art and Industry School and expressed gratitude for its creation.

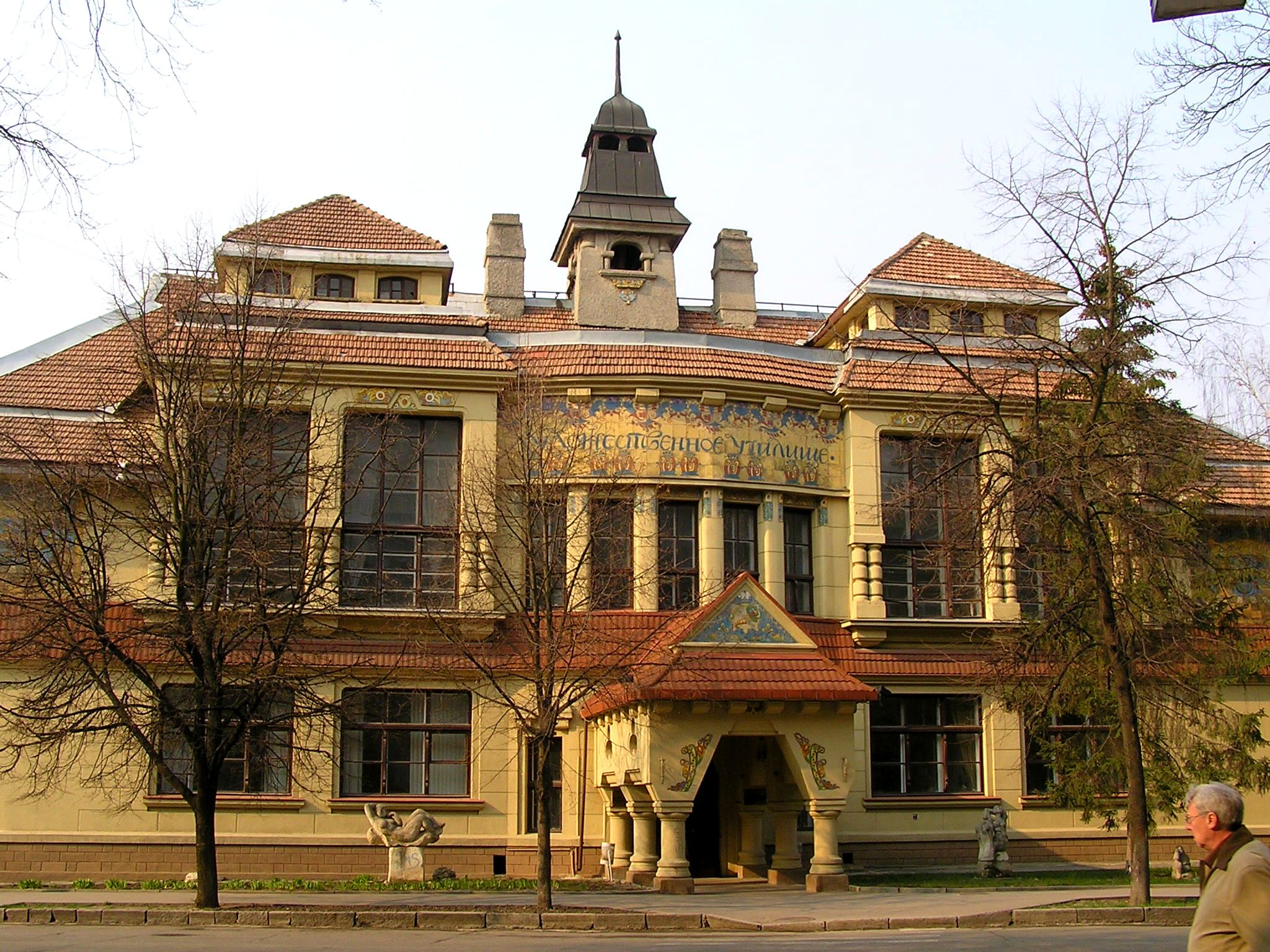
Modern building of KSADA. Built in the Ukrainian Art Nouveau style in 1913

In 1912, the school became the "Kharkiv Art School"; a satellite school of the Imperial Academy under the direction of Alexander Lubimov. For the school in the same year on Kaplunivska Street (now Mystetstv Street (Art Street)), a new building was built. The author of the project is architect Kostyantyn Mykolayovych Zhukov. The architect designed the facade in the Ukrainian Art Nouveau style, which was protested by pro-Russian politicians of the time. However, thanks to Maria's husband Serhiy Oleksandrovych, Ukrainian historian Mykola Fedorovych Sumtsov, architect Viktor Valerianovych Velychko, Ukrainian nationalist Mykola Ivanovych Mikhnovsky, the project in the Ukrainian style was defended, and Kharkiv deputies mostly voted for its adoption.

In addition to drawing and teaching, she was the author of numerous articles and brochures on art education, as well as the textbook "The ABCs of Drawing for the Family and the School" (1879).

Completely blind, she taught until the end of her life. Maria Dmytrivna Raevska-Ivanova died at 11 am on 22 December [O.S. 9 December] 1912 in her house at 8 Chernyshevska Street in Kharkiv. She was buried in her native village of Havrylivka. Her grave was demolished by the Soviet authorities. Later she was reburied, and a modern monument was erected on her grave.

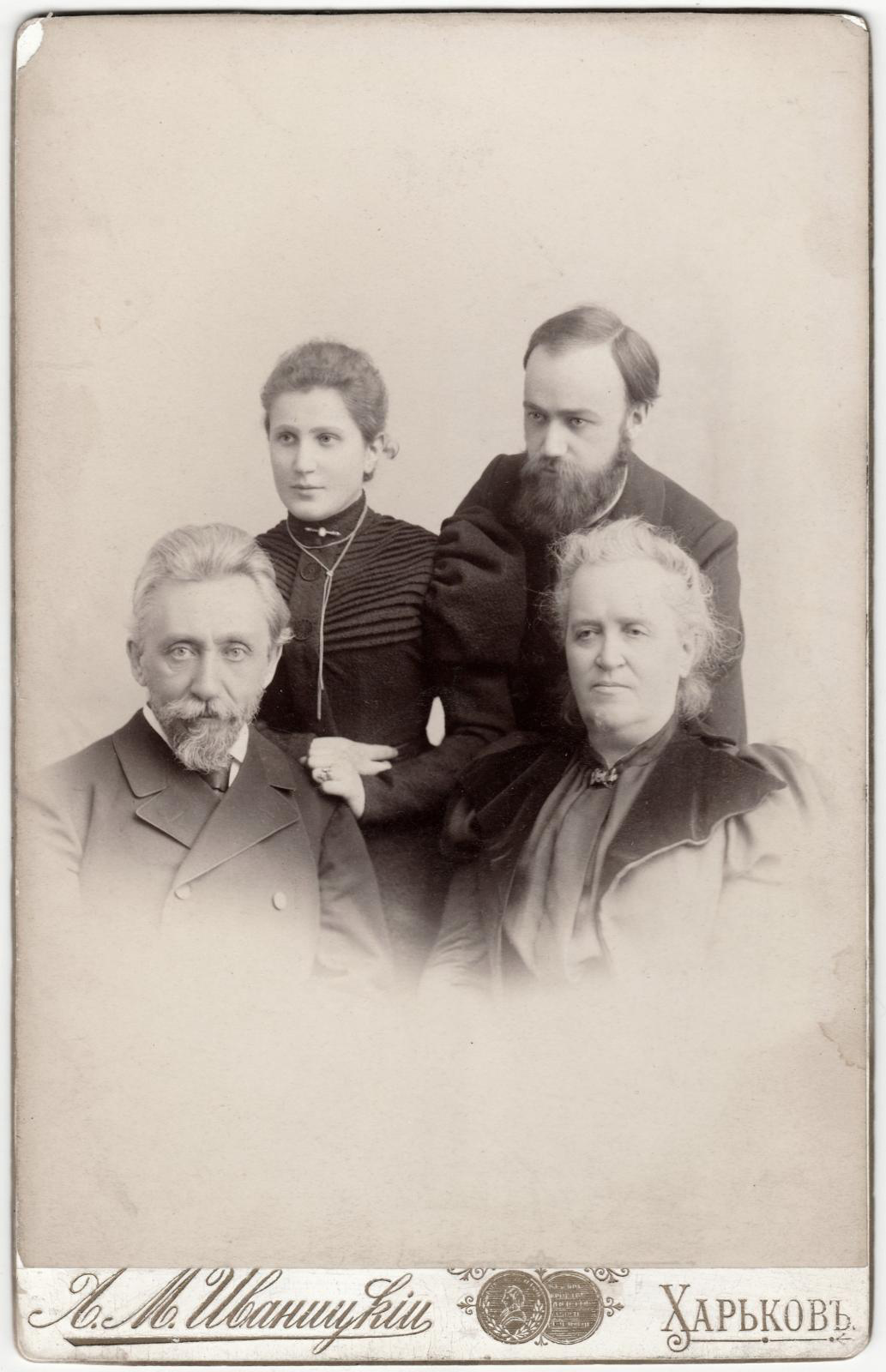
The Raevsky family. Serhiy Raevsky, his daughter-in-law, Alexander Raevsky, Maria Raevska-Ivanova

During the Soviet era, Maria Raevska-Ivanova's school was a technical school, and is now known as the "Kharkiv State Academy of Design and Arts" (1963). The Raevsky house on Chernyshevsky Street was taken away from the family by the Soviet authorities, now it is an office building. Her son, Alexander Sergeyevich, was a technical engineer who participated in the design of several familiar types of Russian steam locomotives.

Some paintings by Maria Dmytrivna Raevska Ivanova were exhibited at the Kharkiv Art Museum, which was closed after a Russian missile hit in 2022.

On October 7, 2021, a monument to the artist and educator Maria Raevska-Ivanova was unveiled in front of the modern school building (now the Kharkiv State Academy of Design and Arts) on Mystetstv Street. The monument was created according to the project of Nelya Vytvytska, which she made in 1998. The Minister of Culture and Information Policy of Ukraine Oleksandr Tkachenko was present at the opening of the monument. After the start of the Russian invasion of Ukraine in 2022, the monument was temporarily dismantled to protect it from shelling. The monument has now been returned to its place.

== Works ==
Several paintings (oils and watercolors) by Maria are known, created under the influence of academicism:

- Self-portrait (1866)
- "Death of a Peasant in Ukraine" (1868)
- "Girl by the Fence"
- "Rural landscape"
- "Still life"
- Self-portrait with a model (circa 1882)

Author of the textbook "The Alphabet of Drawing for Family and School" (1879) and the manuals "To the Regulations of Ornamental Elements" (1896), "Experience of a Program for Teaching Drawing in Sunday Classes for Craftsmen" (1895).

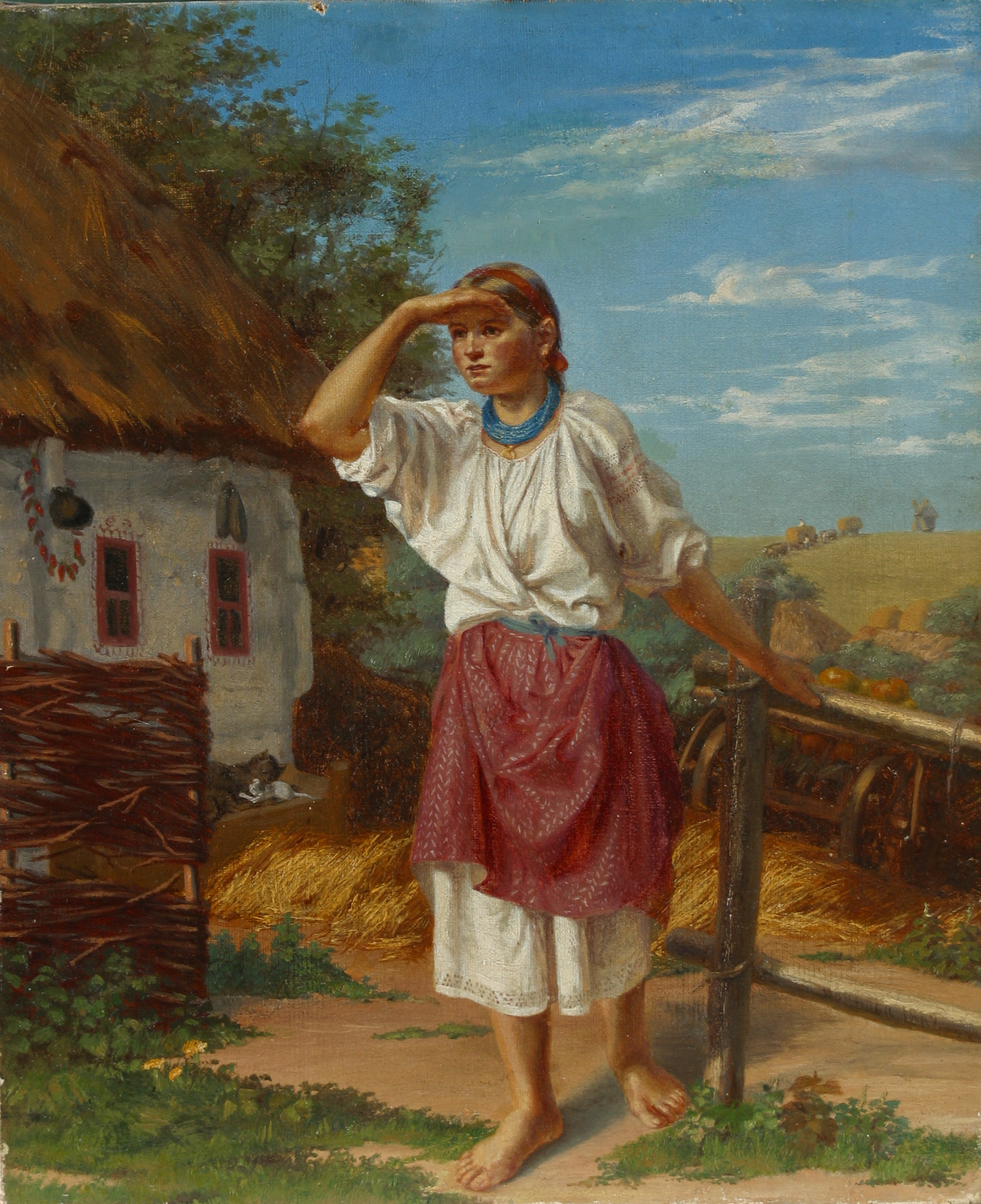
"Girl by the Fence"

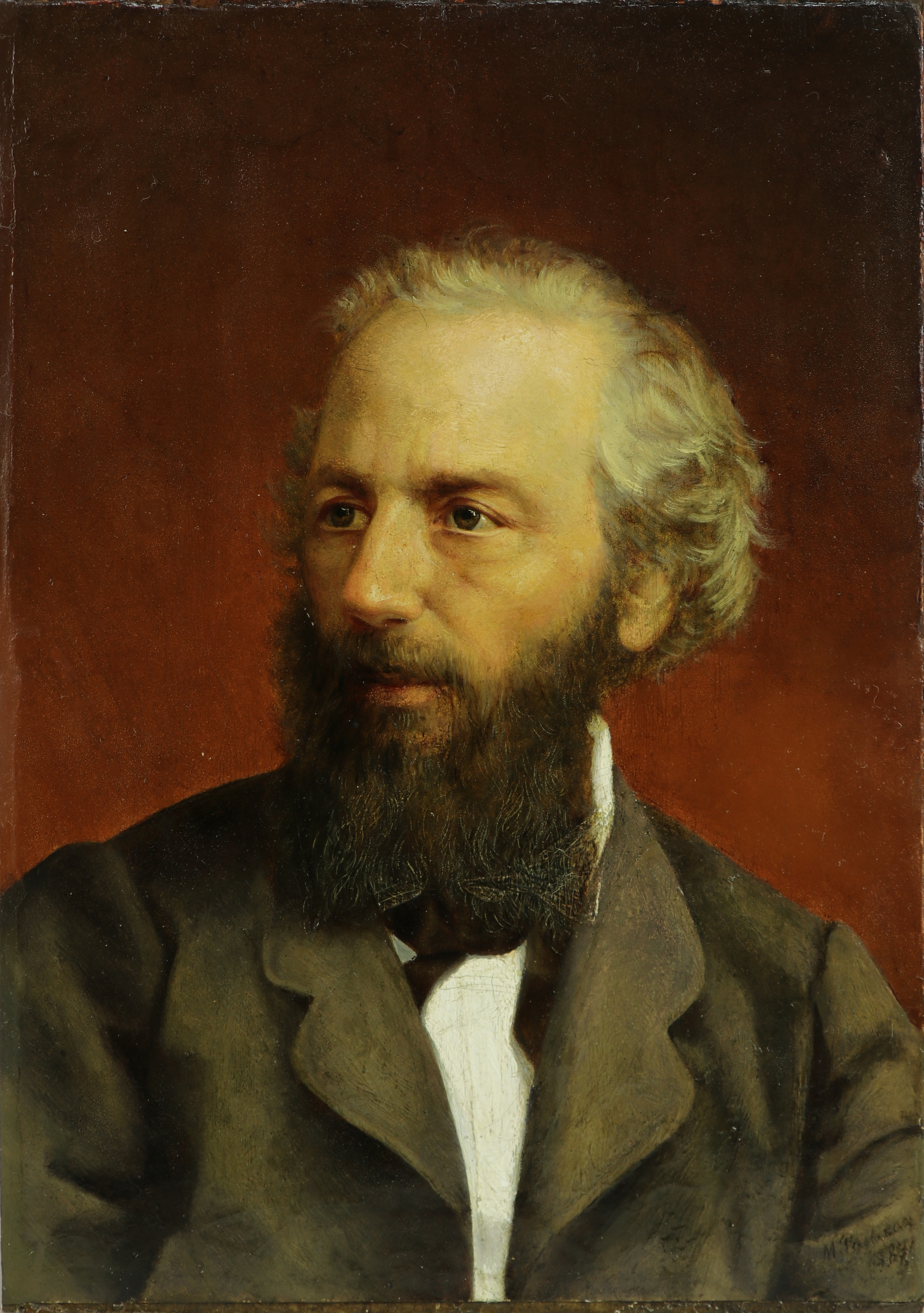
Portrait of N. Beketov

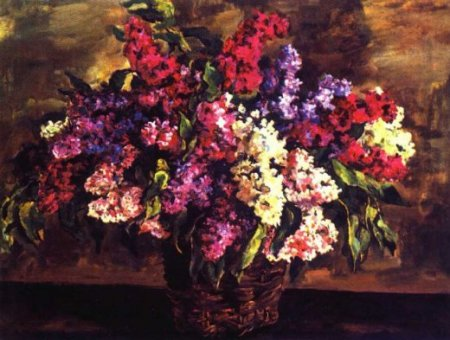
"Still life"

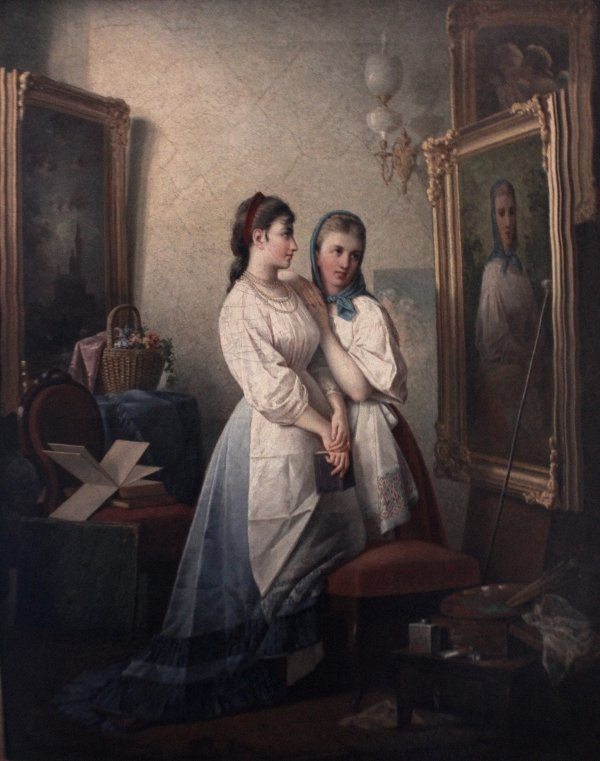
Self-portrait with a model

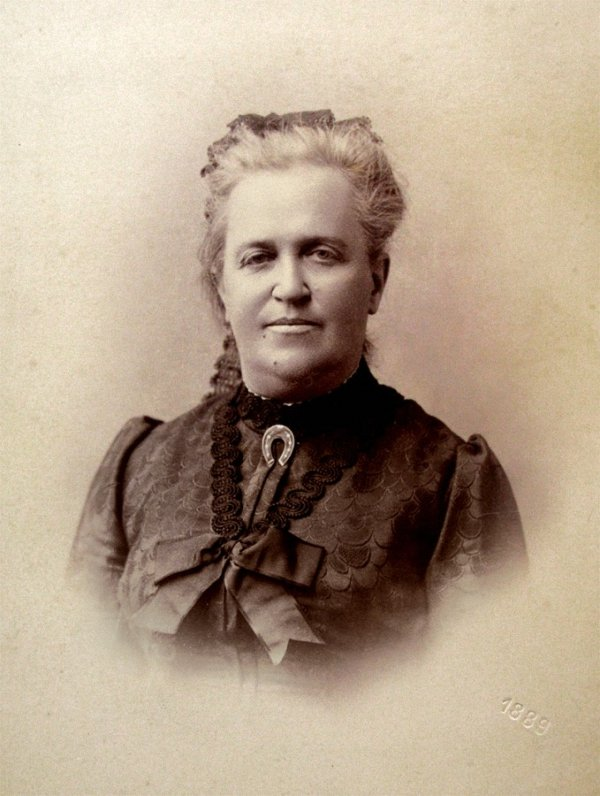
M.D. Raevska-Ivanova in 1889

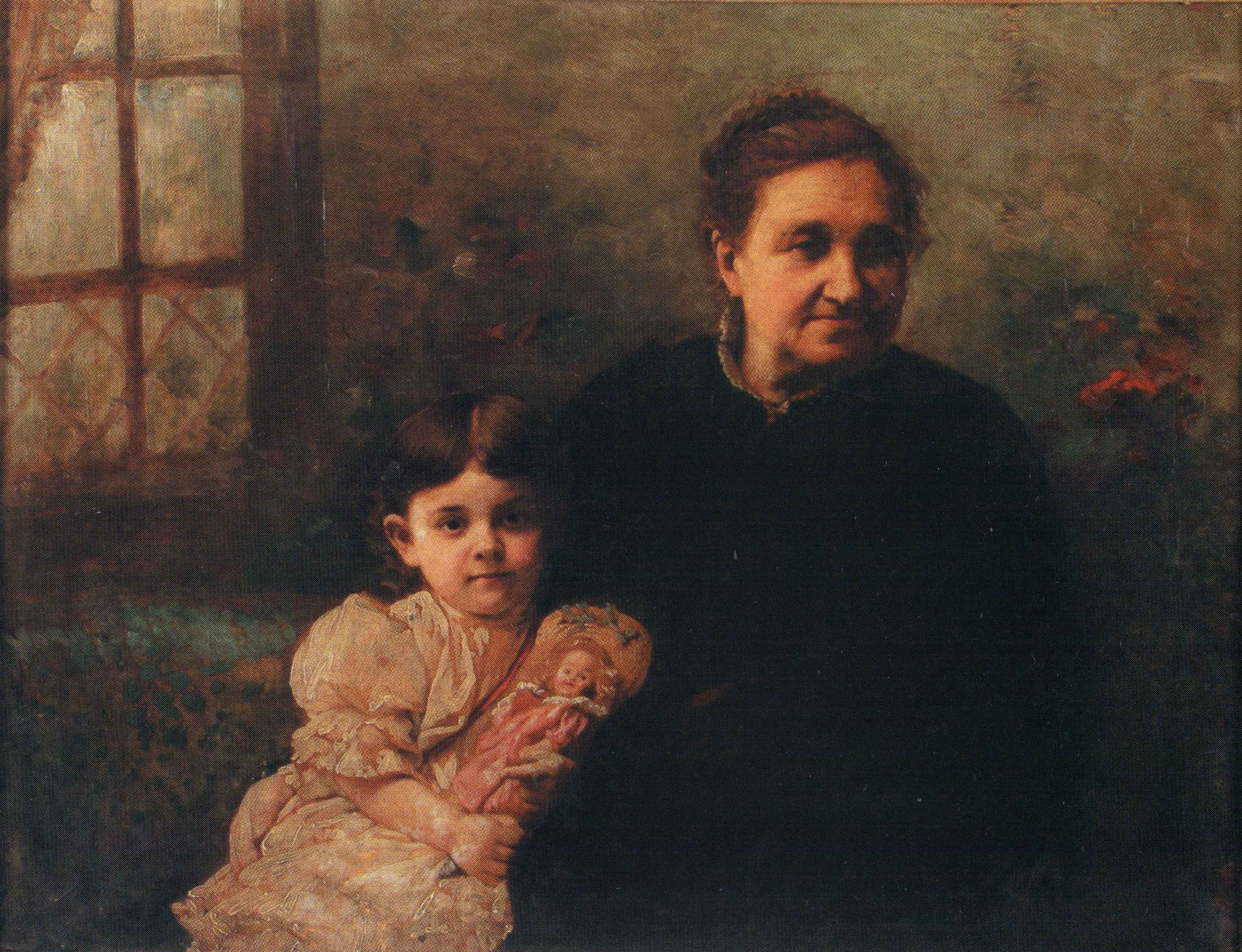
Portrait of M.D. Raevska-Ivanova by O.M. Ivanitsky

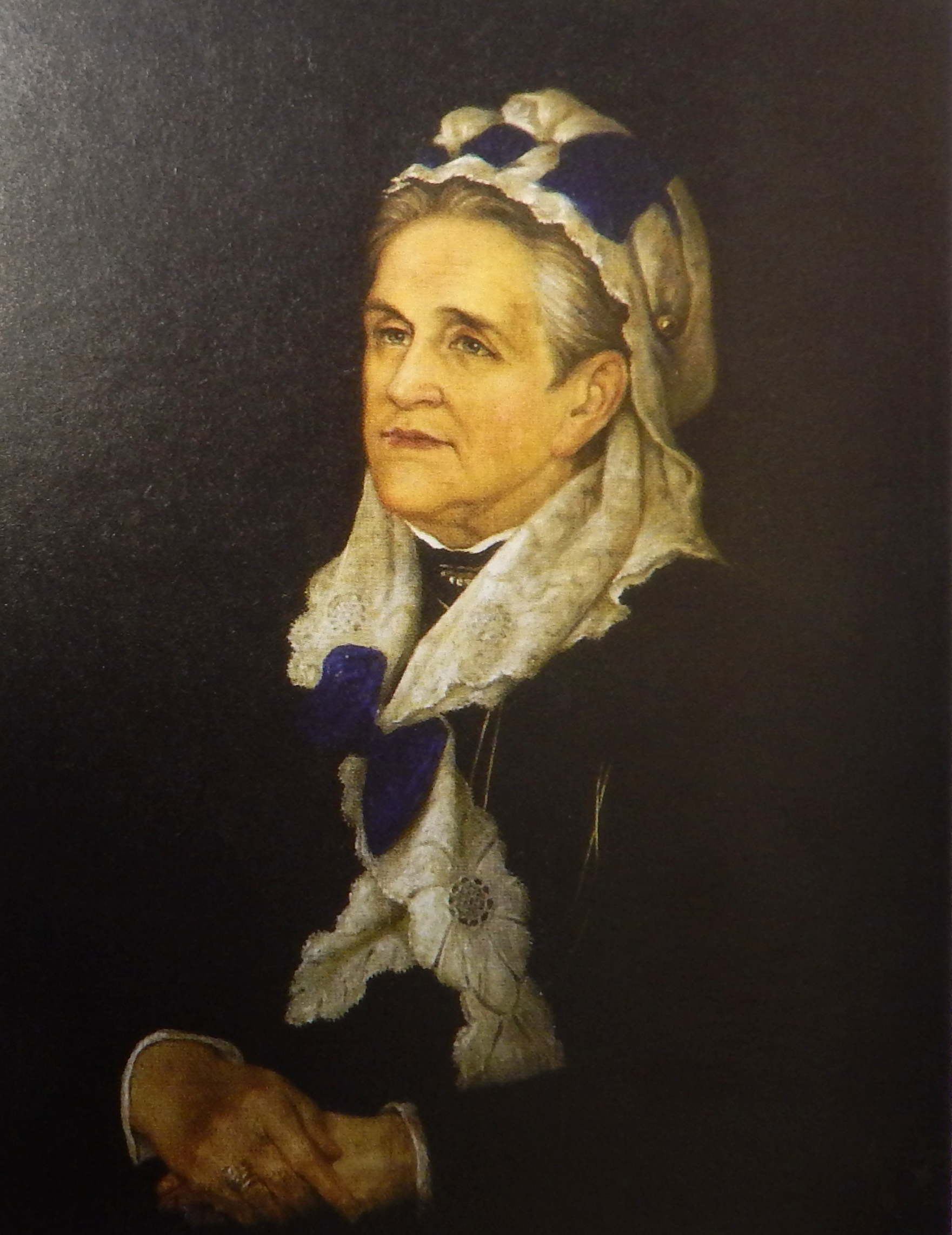
Portrait of the M. Raevska-Ivanova

== Sources ==
- Alohinsson, Anton (20 June 2024). "Як Марія Раєвська-Іванова навчила Харків малювати. «Харків, де твоє обличчя?»". Люк.
- Paramonov, Andrii. "Иванова-Раевская Мария Дмитриевна". Откуда родом.
- "Художнє училище". Харківська мапа. 16 January 2025.
- Chercaska, Hanna (16 January 2025). "Перша професійна художниця України". Голос України.
