= Kharkiv State School of Art =

Art school in Kharkiv, Ukraine

Coordinates: 50.007778°N 36.201944°E

The Kharkiv State School of Art (Ukrainian: Харківське державне художнє училище, KhDKhU, romanized: Kharkivske derzhavne khudozhnie uchylyshche) is an educational institution in Kharkiv, Ukraine. It accepts a new class of students each year for instruction in the subjects of visual arts education, sculpture, decorative arts, graphic design, and landscape architecture.

== History ==
The Kharkiv Art School was formally established in 1896 by the Kharkiv city government, based on the previous private art school of Maria Raevskaia-Ivanova. In 1912, the school reopened in a new specially-designed building by architect Kostiantyn Zhukov in the modernist style with contemporary influences from older Ukrainian buildings. The first director of the new school was Alexander Lubimov, a student of Ilya Repin. The teachers were also alumni of Repin's workshop at the Imperial Academy of Arts in Saint Petersburg.

In 1913, the school was managed by Semyon Prokhorov, formerly head of the Art School in Tomsk, Russia. In 1914, Gavriil Gorelov became its principal, followed by Aleksey Kokel in 1916. A faculty of architecture was added 1925.

== Faculties ==
- Design
- Visual art
- Sculpture
- Theatrical art
- Architecture

== Famous educators ==
- Aleksey Kokel - taught 1916–1921
- Volodymyr Starikov - taught 1982-2010
- Leonid Andrievskyi - taught 1938–1941, 1945–1947
- Sergey Besedin - studied 1923–1929, taught 1929-1941

== Famous graduates ==
- Natalia Verhun - 1953-1958
- Aleksandr Deyneka - 1915-1917
- Sergey Kamennoy - 1974-1978
- Hryhoriy Matsehora - graduated 1957
- Leonid Chernov - graduated 1941
