= Reply of the Zaporozhian Cossacks =

Painting by Ilya Repin

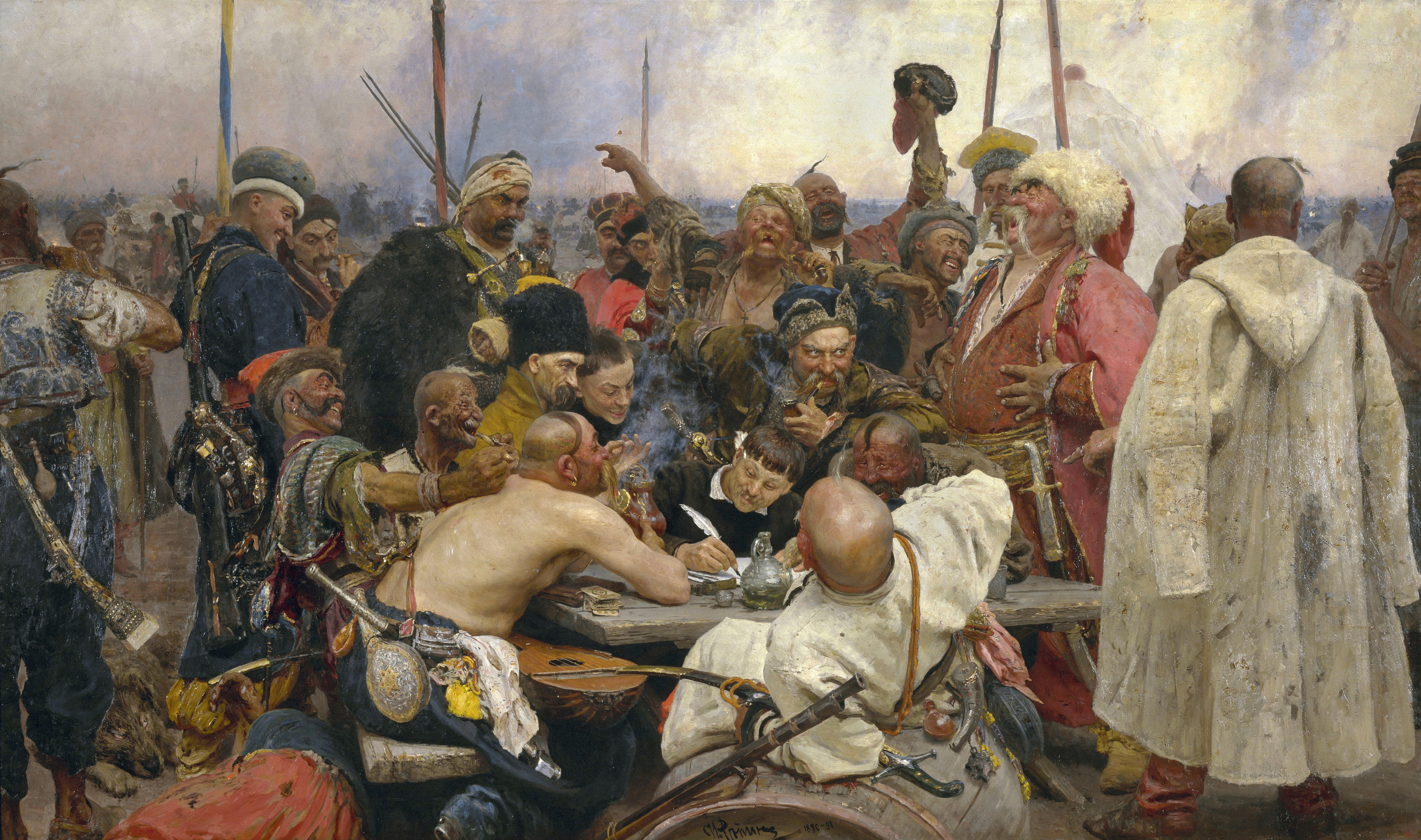
- Artist: Ilya Repin
- Year: 1880–1891
- Medium: Oil on canvas
- Dimensions: 203 cm × 358 cm (80 in × 141 in)
- Location: State Russian Museum, Saint Petersburg

Reply of the Zaporozhian Cossacks is a painting by Ukrainian-born Russian realist artist Ilya Repin. It is also known as Cossacks of Saporog Are Drafting a Manifesto and Cossacks are Writing a Letter to the Turkish Sultan. (Note: Russian: Запорожцы пишут письмо турецкому султану; Ukrainian: Запорожці пишуть листа турецькому султанові)

Repin began painting the canvas in 1880 and finished in 1891. His study drawings he made in stanitsa Pashkovskaya (today within Krasnodar), Yekaterinoslav (today Dnipro), and Kachanivka.

He recorded the years of work along the lower edge of the canvas. Alexander III bought the painting for 35,000 rubles. Since then, the canvas has been exhibited in the State Russian Museum in Saint Petersburg with another version by Repin in the Kharkiv Art Museum in Kharkiv, Ukraine.

The painting was featured in the 1980 BBC Two series 100 Great Paintings.

== Context ==
=== Historicity ===
Reply of the Zaporozhian Cossacks depicts a supposedly historical tableau, set in 1676, and based on the legend of Cossacks sending an insulting reply to an ultimatum from the Sultan of the Ottoman Empire, Mehmed IV.

According to the story, the Zaporozhian Cossacks (from "beyond the rapids", Ukrainian: za porohamy), inhabiting the lands around the lower Dnieper River in Ukraine, had defeated Ottoman Empire forces in battle. However, despite his army having suffered this loss to them, Mehmed demanded that the Cossacks submit to Ottoman rule. The Cossacks, led by Ivan Sirko, replied in a characteristic manner: they wrote a letter, replete with insults and profanities. The painting exhibits the Cossacks' pleasure at striving to come up with ever more base vulgarities.

In the 19th century, the historical Zaporozhian Cossacks were sometimes the subject of picaresque tales demonstrating admiration of their primitive vitality and contemptuous disregard for authority (in marked contrast to the more civilized subjects of the authoritarian Russian state). Whether the incident portrayed actually happened or is just another of these tales is not known. No concrete or reliable evidence exists that it did happen, but the question remains disputed.

U.S.-based Slavic and Eastern European historian Daniel C. Waugh (1978) observed: "The correspondence of the sultan with the Chyhyryn Cossacks had undergone a textual transformation sometime in the eighteenth century whereby the Chyhyryntsy became the Zaporozhians and the controlled satire of the reply was debased into vulgarity. In this vulgar version, the Cossack correspondence spread quite widely in the nineteenth century. (...) The best-known reflection of the nineteenth-century popularity of the Cossack correspondence is the famous painting by II'ia Repin showing the uproarious Zaporozhians penning their reply."

=== Repin's interpretation ===
Nikolai Gogol's 1842 romantic-historical novella Taras Bulba describes the incident in passing. Repin associated with Savva Mamontov and his artistic circle and probably heard the story there; at any rate, Repin made his first sketches for the painting in Mamontov's home.

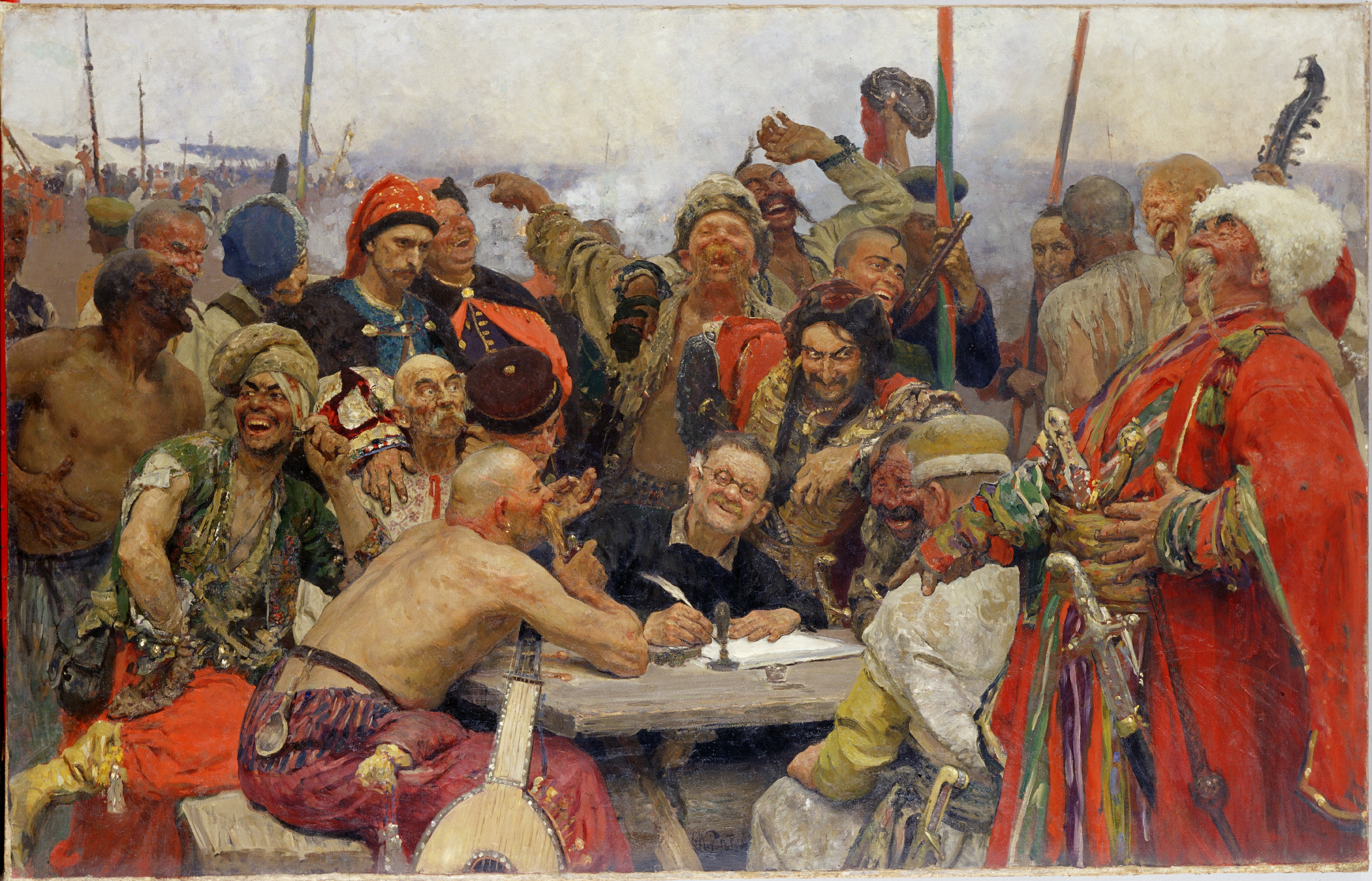
Second Version of the Painting

While working on the original version, Repin in 1889 began work on a second version. This work remained unfinished. The artist tried to make the second version of The Cossacks more "historically authentic". In 1932 it was transferred by the Tretyakov Gallery to the M. F. Sumtsov Kharkiv Historical Museum. In 1935, it was moved to the Kharkiv Art Museum, where it is now stored. This canvas is slightly smaller than the original version.

The historian Dmytro Yavornytsky assisted Repin in portraying the scene authentically.

During the Russian invasion of eastern Ukraine in March 2022, when the Kharkiv region came under heavy artillery and air fire, the museum staff rushed to remove their artworks from the museum to a safer place. The second version of The Cossacks was amongst the artworks relocated for safety.

== Models ==
The "Cossacks” who posed for the painting were friends of Repin and academics from Saint Petersburg University, and included men of Ukrainian, Russian, Cossack, Jewish and Polish ancestry.

Character	Notes
	The "Smiling soldier with a red cap" was modelled by Jan Ciągliński, a teacher of drawing in Petersburg and an active participant in the World of Art movement. He was of Polish ancestry.
	The "Tall smiling man", who portrays Andriy, the younger son of Taras Bulba, is the son of the Russian aristocrat Varvara Uexküll von Gyllenband, and the great-nephew of the composer Mikhail Glinka.
	A tall cossack with a headband on his head is Odesa painter Nikolai Kuznetsov, an ethnic Greek. He was a joker, a strongman, an academician of the Academy of Arts, professor, a class director of battle painting in the Academy.
	The toothless and wrinkled old man with a tobacco pipe was captured by Repin from a casual trip companion who accompanied him to a pier in the city of Alexandrovsk (today Zaporizhzhia).
	The student with his hair cut in the Makitra fashion and who is too young to be able to grow a mustache is Porfyrii Martynovych. He studied at the Academy of Arts, was skilled in filigree artwork, "and spent his summer vacations in the Poltava region collecting ethnographic materials and painting or drawing village scenes and portraits of peasants, landlords, stewards, and precentors", as well as "landscapes and portraits." However, due to an illness he was forced to give up landscape painting at the age of 25. Repin was not able to paint him live, but instead used a gypsum mask of Martynovych's face, which captured his smiling expression.
	The "Serious Cossack" was modelled by the art patron Vasyl Tarnovsky, an important supporter of Ukrainian culture.
	The image of Cossack Holota ("impoverished") was modeled from a coachman of Vasyl Tarnovsky Mykytka. Repin, who was impressed by the man's edentulous, cyclopic face and drunken, ridiculous behaviour, was able to draw him as he and Mykytka were crossing the Dnieper on ferry.
	"The Smiling Soldier", in the role of Otaman Ivan Sirko, was modeled by General Mikhail Dragomirov, an officer in the Russian army and Governor-General of Southwestern Krai.
	The character that depicts a Tatar was drawn from an actual Tatar student.
	"Taras Bulba", the leader of the Cossacks, was modelled by Alexander Ivanovich Rubets, a professor at Petersburg University. His likeness has been associated, through an entirely incidental process, with the Iranian Azerbaijani folk figure "Hassan Guli."
	The "Cossack with a yellow hat", almost hidden by Taras Bulba, was modelled by Fyodor Stravinsky, an opera singer with the Mariinsky Theatre, of Polish descent, and the father of the composer Igor Stravinsky.
	The "Top of a bald head" belongs to Georgi Alekseyev, who was Grand Chamberlain at the court of the Russian Emperor, in charge of court finances. He was invited to pose for the role, but refused, as he felt it was undignified. Instead, Repin sketched the back of his head while Alekseyev was engaged in looking at an exhibit of prints. When he saw the painting, Alekseyev recognized his head, and was not pleased, but by then the painting was in the imperial collection.
	The half-naked Zaporizhia warrior was a friend of Repin and Yavornytsky and a teacher at the folk school of Kostiantyn Belonovsky. Although he is depicted playing cards, in real life he did not.
	"The writer" was modelled by the historian and archeologist Dmytro Yavornytsky, the author of a major work on the history of Zaporozhian Cossacks.

== Depictions ==
The image has become a well-known reference in Russian culture, parodied or emulated by other work such as political cartoons, including Members of Duma drafting a reply to Stolypin and Soviet leaders write the letter of defiance to George Curzon, seen below. It is also referenced in other works, such as both the 2009 Russian film Taras Bulba, which depicts the scene itself, and the American film of the same name (which includes the painting in its opening credits); both are adaptations of a historical novella by that name, though the novella does not include the scene.

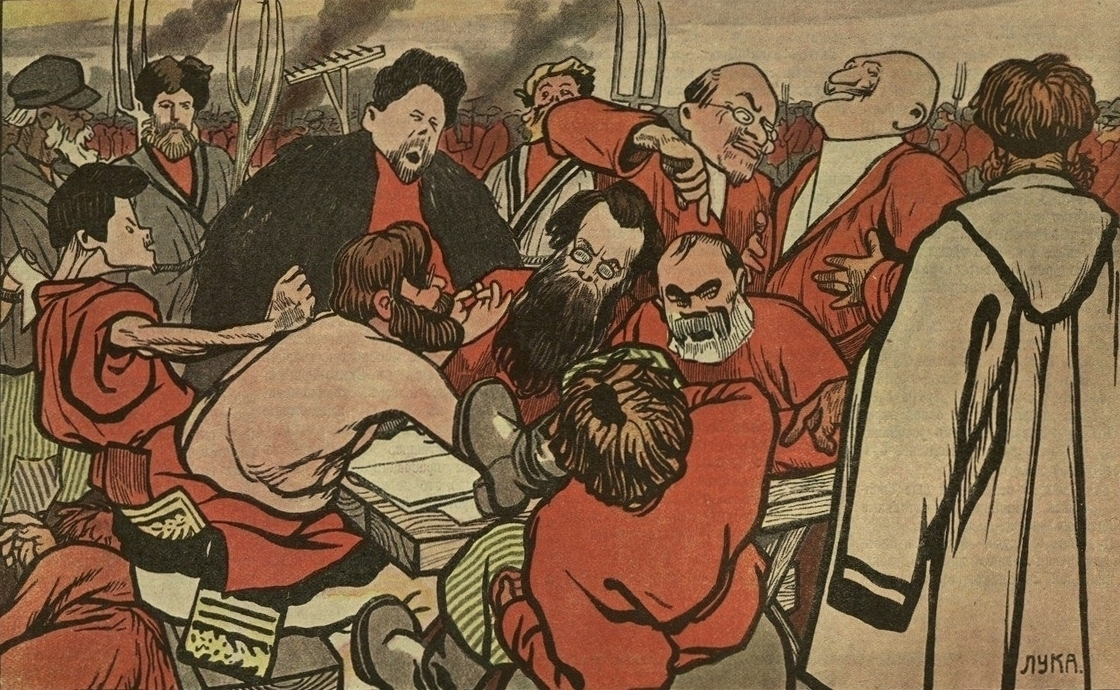
Members of the 1907 Duma drafting a reply to Stolypin

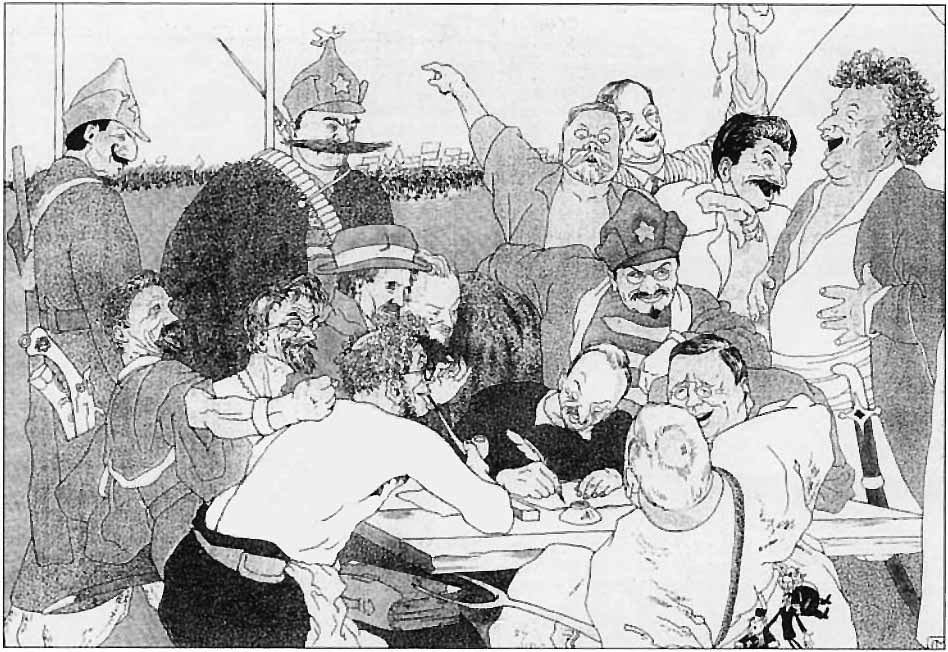
A 1923 Russian cartoon parody of the painting, "Bolsheviks writing a Reply to Englishman Curzon"

Beyond Russia, the painting is frequently used as a symbol or metonymy for Cossacks in general. The "Cossacks" expansion to the video game Europa Universalis IV adapted the text of the reply for its trailer and included artwork based on the original painting, the game Cossacks: European Wars has the central detail of the picture in its logo, and the game Cossacks 3 has the painting as the background of the main menu.

The text has inspired several adaptations; most notable is probably the French versification by Guillaume Apollinaire, included as "Réponse des Cosaques Zaporogues au Sultan de Constantinople" as part of his poem "La Chanson du mal-aimé", in his 1913 collection Alcools. This version was set to music by Dmitri Shostakovich in his Symphony No. 14, amongst other poets, and by French singer-songwriter Léo Ferré, in a full oratorio on La Chanson du mal-aimé in 1953.

Not all treatment of the painting has been positive. Dwight Macdonald called it "kitsch" in an article in the Partisan Review, writing "Why after all should ignorant peasants prefer Repin (a leading exponent of Russian academic kitsch in painting) to Picasso, whose abstract technique is at least as relevant to their own primitive folk art as is the former's realistic style? No, if the masses crowd into the Tretyakov (Moscow's museum of contemporary Russian art: kitsch), it is largely because they have been conditioned to shun 'formalism' and to admire 'socialist realism.'" Art critic Clement Greenberg subsequently popularized Macdonald's phrasing in an influential 1939 essay, "Avant-Garde and Kitsch".

Painter Vassily Nesterenko made a version of the painting in 2017 featuring modern Russian soldiers in Syria, while French photographer Émeric Lhuisset made a photographic version of the painting in 2023 featuring modern Ukrainian Army soldiers. Lhuisset donated a print of the photograph to the Kherson Regional Art Museum, which had been looted by Russian troops in 2022. Russia considers the painting to be an example of Russian heritage, while Ukraine considers it to be Ukrainian.

== Book references ==
- Dmytro I. Yavornytsky (1895) History of the Zaporogian Cossacks, Vol. 2, pp. 517–518. St. Petersburg. Available in both modern Ukrainian and Russian language editions.
- Myron B. Kuropas (1961) The Saga of Ukraine: An Outline History. MUN Enterprises
- Саєнко В.М. (2004) "Лист до турецького султана" та деякі міфологічні відповідності // Нові дослідження пам’яток козацької доби в Україні. – Вип.13. – К. – С. 418–420.
- Prymak, Thomas M., "Message to Mehmed: Repin Creates his Zaporozhian Cossacks," in his Ukraine, the Middle East, and the West (Montreal and Kingston: McGill-Queen's University Press, 2021), pp. 173–200.
- Jack Carr, (2019) True Believer, Atria/Emily Bestler Books, chapter 67.
