= Mykhaylo Berkos =

Ukrainian artist

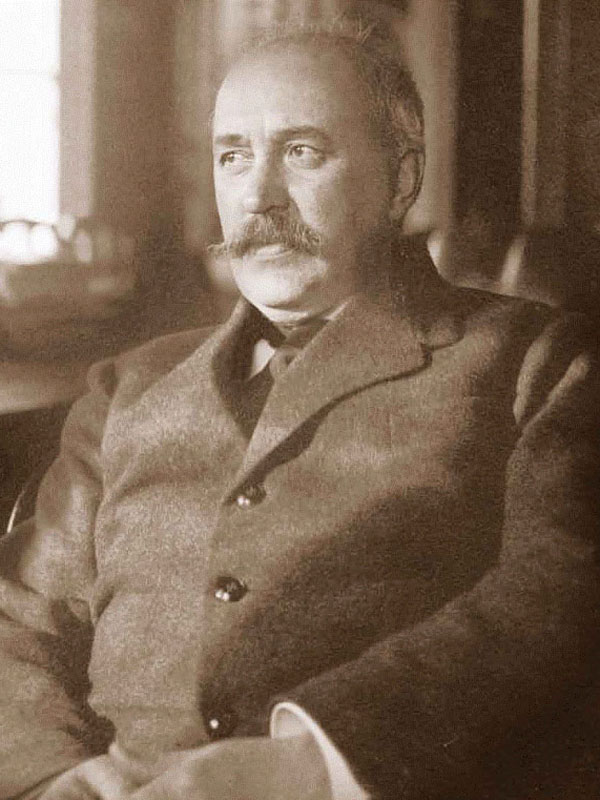
- Born: September 3, 1861; Odesa
- Died: December 20, 1919 (aged 58); Kharkiv
- Education: Imperial Academy of Arts (1889)
- Known for: Painting
- Movement: Impressionism
- Awards: Big Gold Medal of the Imperial Academy of Arts (1888)

Mykhailo Andrіyovich Berkos (Ukrainian: Михайло Андрійович Беркос; 3 September 1861 in Odesa – 20 December 1919 in Kharkiv) was a Ukrainian artist of Greek origin. He worked mainly in the genre of landscape art and experienced a significant influence of European Impressionism. He painted in oils and watercolors. In his works he often turned to the subject of Ukrainian nature.

== Biography ==
Berkos was born on September 3, 1861, in Odesa. His father Andrey Ignatievich Berkos, a subject of Greece, served in the firm Bellino Fender, his mother Martha Ivanovna came from a Russian noble family. The family lived in their house on Pushkinskaya.

Mykhailo Berkos first studied painting in Odesa Drawing School, graduating in 1877. Then he continued his education at the Imperial Academy of Arts in Saint Petersburg, where he studied from 1878 to 1889 in the studio of Mikhail Clodt and Volodymyr Orlovsky. He got a small and large silver medals (1884–1886), a small gold medal for the painting View of one of the oldest parks in St. Petersburg (1887), a gold medal for the painting Landscape. Forest in the swamp (1888). During the holidays he came to Kharkiv with fellow artists and painted landscapes, in particular sketch Full poppies (1885). In 1889, he graduated from the academy with the rank of first degree class artist and the right to travel abroad at public expense (pension).

From 1890 to 1893 Berkos as a pensioner of the Academy traveled by Europe, studying art of museums in France, Germany, Spain, Italy, Switzerland. He painted a lot, perfected his technique, was influenced by Impressionism and en plein air painting. After the expiration of the pension Berkos lived in St. Petersburg for some time and presented his paintings at exhibitions of societies of artists.

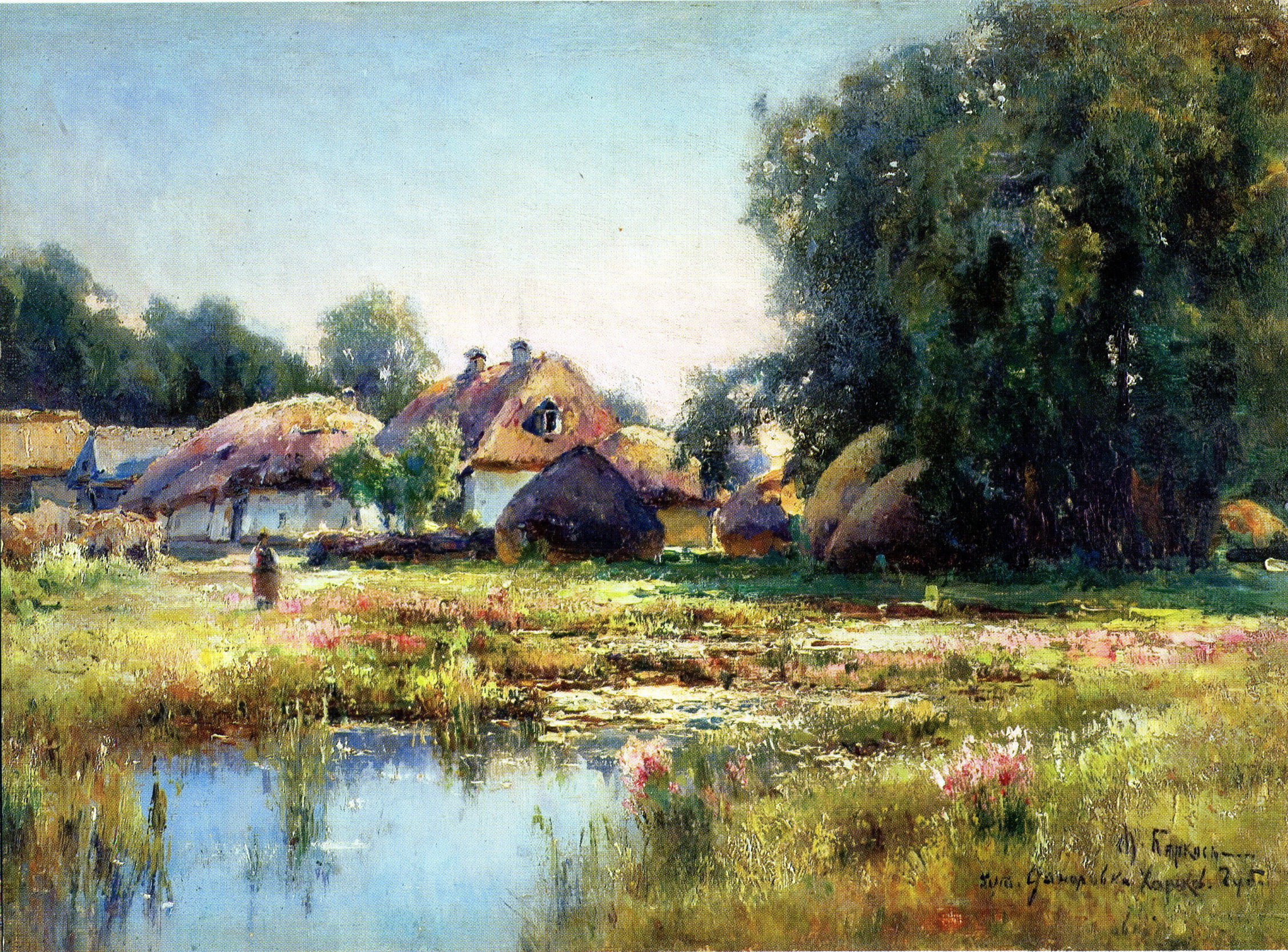
On the khutir. Mala Danylivka (1903), canvas on cardboard, oil, 23,9х33,9

In the second half of the 1890s, he moved to Kharkiv. He lived in a suburb of Mala Danylivka with the General's widow Maria Reinicke. There he wrote sketches, among which Greenhouses (1895) and Landscape with a Church (1897) have survived. From 1904 he taught at the school of drawing in Kharkiv.

At the initiative of Berkos in 1912 the Kharkiv Art College was opened, where until 1917 he was one of the leading teachers. Berkos put a lot of effort to enrich the collection of the first Museum of Art and Industry in Ukraine. In the early 1900s he worked at the Kharkiv literary and artistic section. As the chairman of the Society of Kharkiv Artists since 1906 he spent a great job of promoting Ukrainian art. In 1907 he participated in the interiors decoration of the Poltava Zemstvo building in the Ukrainian Nouveau style.

In 1900 he was exhibited at the Exposition Universelle in Paris. Solo exhibitions of Berkos took place in 1906 and 1908 in Kharkiv, there also was an exhibition of works by Kharkiv artists Serhii Vasylkivsky and Mykhaylo Berkos in 1911 in Kyiv. He died of typhus on 20 December 1919 in Kharkiv.

== Exhibitions ==
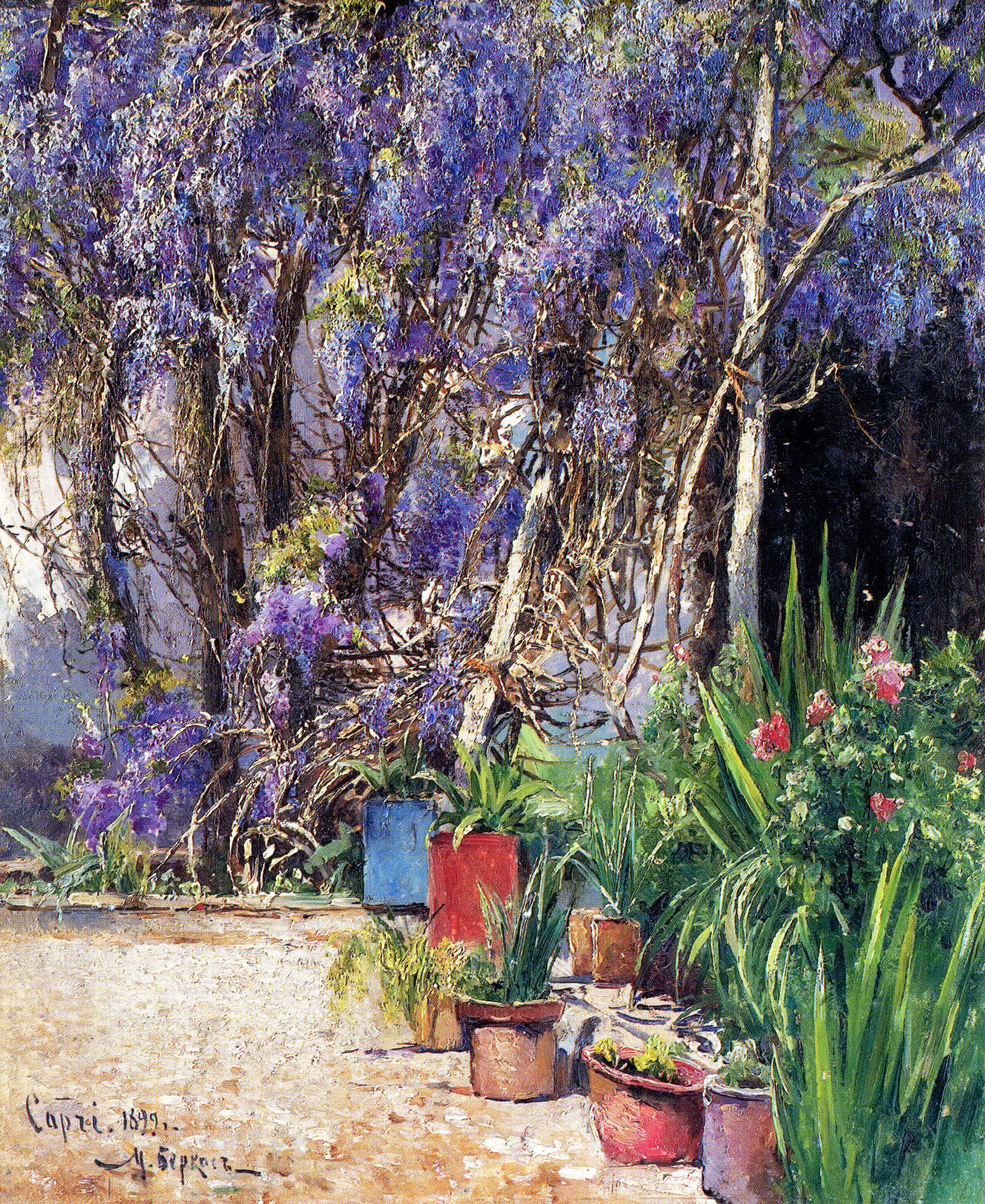
Capri (1899), wood/oil, 41х34

Works of Berkos were presented at exhibitions-competitions and exhibitions-sales of the Academy of Arts (1890, 1892–1894), St. Petersburg Society of Artists (1894–1903), societies of Russian watercolours (1894–1898, 1900–1905, 1907, 1910, 1914), southern Russian artists, Kharkiv painters (1893, 1894, 1912, 1914–1917), the All-Russia exhibition in Nizhny Novgorod (1896), the Exposition Universelle in Paris (1900).

Intravital solo exhibitions of the artist were organised in 1906 and 1908 (Kharkiv Art and Industry Museum), there also was an exhibition of paintings by Serhii Vasylkivsky and Mykhaylo Berkos in 1911 in Kyiv.

In October 1938 the Kharkiv National Gallery exhibited about 120 paintings created by the artist in the years 1890–1919. Exhibitions of his paintings were also held in the Kharkiv Art Museum in 1962, 1990 and 1996. The exhibition Outstanding Ukrainian landscape masters in 1990 presented 28 paintings and three drawings from the museum and private collections.

== Artworks ==
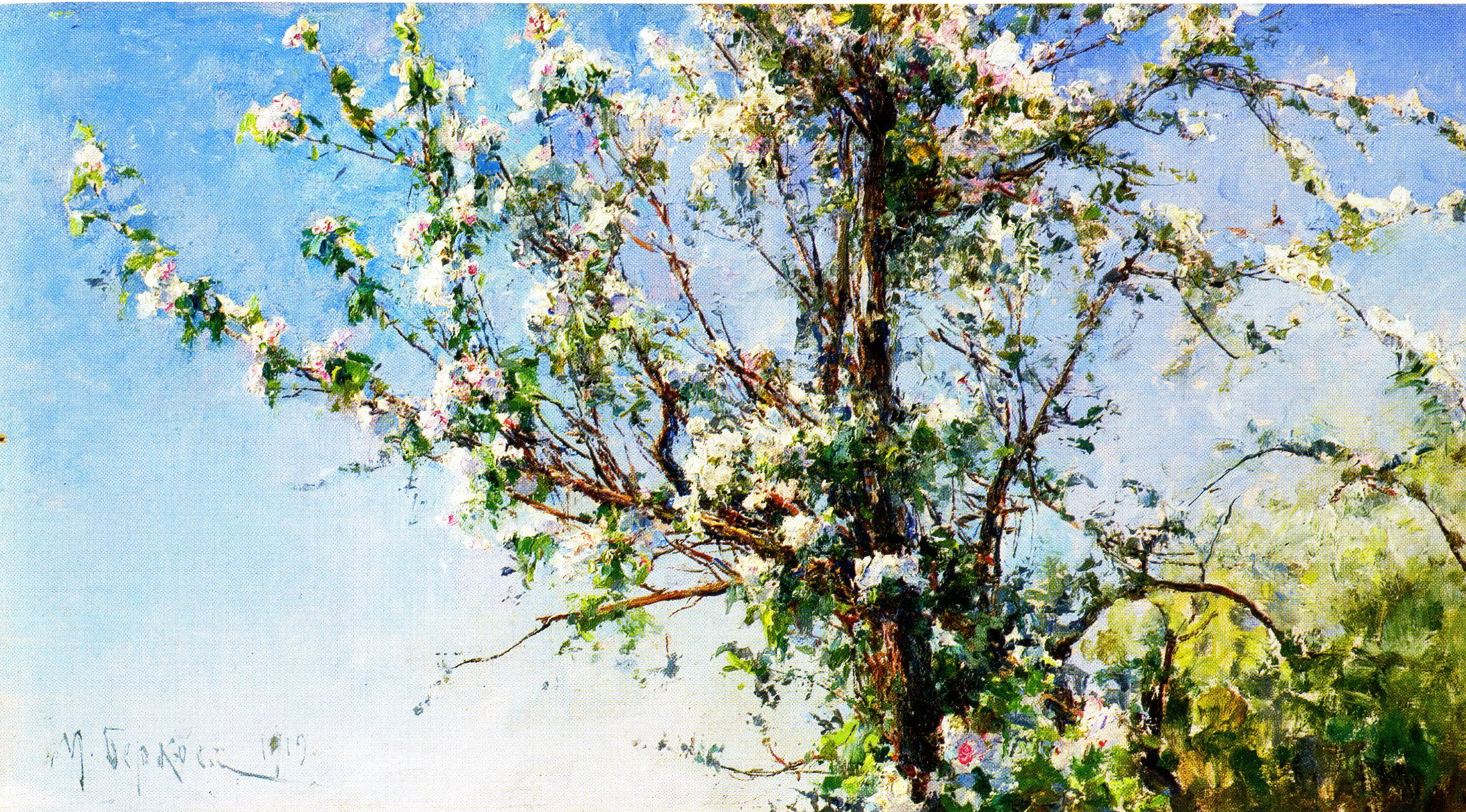
Apple tree in bloom (1919), wood, oil, 23,5х43,8

Almost all of the works of Berkos which were stored at his home (350 paintings and sketches) after his death were burned by his wife. However, his works have been preserved in museum collections in Kharkiv, Kyiv, Moscow, St. Petersburg, Ulyanovsk, Stavropol, Alupka, North Ossetia, Germany, France and Switzerland.

The main theme of the artist's art throughout his career was a Ukrainian landscape, the specific features of nature, the nature of vegetation. Berkos loved to paint during blossoming. Village streets with white houses and lush trees, flowering fields of flax and buckwheat were his favorite motifs: paintings Flax in bloom (1893), Buckwheat in bloom (1894), July. Poppies are blooming (1913), Apple tree in bloom (1919). His sketches Full poppies (1885), The Valley, Flax (1893) noted completeness, reasonableness of the composition, the freshness of colour, special refinement. Particularly noteworthy is a small picture of Berkos from the Kharkiv Art Museum, 47 x 66 cm in size called "Budyaki". The picture, like most of the master’s works, captivates one’s eyes, as much life as there is still to be found in these dried weeds! Following the impressionistic principle that “there should be traces of how it was made in the picture,” the master uses a roundish, dotted, dense brushstroke, which creates a flickering, vibrating surface, where sunlight shines through a hot golden under-shadow through a light-air background. In the Russian Museum of St. Petersburg is a vivid work of nature M. Berkosa "Stream". The size of the painting is 120 by 177 cm, single, oil, year of writing 1889.

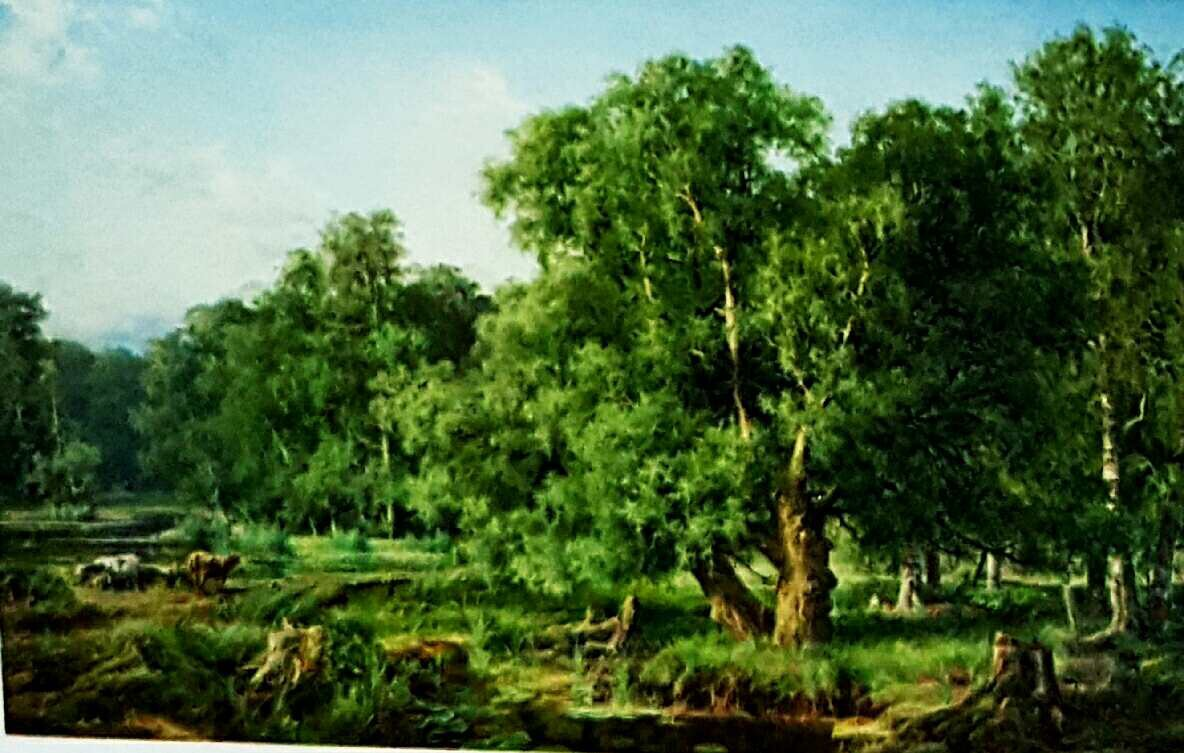

Landscapes Rome and Sorrento (1899) take the romantic colouring of past times by the reproduction of pure blue sky, bright sunshine, rich color shades of green tall trees, flowing enamel-like painting. Sketch Haven. Amalfi (1899) was depicted in light improvisational manner, it’s an elegant painting, impregnated with a dynamic movement.

The colour structure of the landscape Winter (1907), painted in the Poltava region, was designed in blue and white palette with flashes of pink with elaborate decorative. In his landscapes the display of the usual corner, above all Sloboda Ukraine, turns into a generalised image of Ukraine. In his work Street in Uman (1895) the picture of a provincial Ukrainian town, its dusty roads, winding streets, ramshackle houses and domes of the churches were reflected with high authenticity. The world that Berkos conveys sparkles with a stream of sun, light and color.

Painting quickly, each picture has its own coloristic discovery. There is a phenomenon called the "absolute eye" of the artist. Among the "seasonal predilections" of the master are summer and spring, the period of the lush flowering of everything on earth. With his hedonistic aspirations, the artist seeks to represent the world in its entirety and in all its brightness. Seemingly drawing his inspiration from the backgrounds of Renoir and Monet, he used their bright, multicolored hues. Berkos creates the feeling of a stroll in the flowering garden, flooded with midday light.

== Literature ==
- Енциклопедія українознавства. У 10-х томах. / Головний редактор Володимир Кубійович. — Париж; Нью-Йорк: Молоде життя, 1954—1989.
- М. А. Беркос. С. М. Ткаченко. П. О. Левченко. Живопис, графіка. Каталог. — Харків, 1991.
- Харківська пейзажна школа: остання чверть ХІХ — початок ХХ століття. — Київ: «Родовід», 2009.
