= Mykola Sumtsov =

Ukrainian art historian and ethnographer

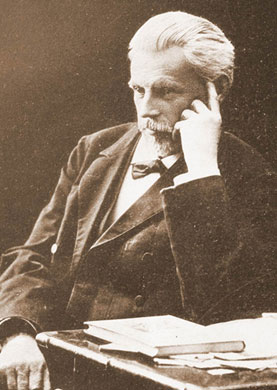
- Sumtsov in 1910
- Born: April 18, 1854; Saint Petersburg, Russian Empire (now Russia)
- Died: September 12, 1922 (aged 68); Kharkiv, Ukrainian SSR (now Ukraine)
- Occupations: ethnographer; folklorist; art historian; literary scholar; educator; museum expert
- Years active: 1880–1922

Mykola Fedorovych Sumtsov (Ukrainian: Микола Федорович Сумцов) or Nikolai Fyodorovich Sumtsov (Russian: Николай Фёдорович Сумцов, 18 April 1854, Saint Petersburg, Russian Empire – 12 September 1922 Kharkiv [Kharkov], Ukrainian SSR, USSR), sometimes spelled Sumcov, was an ethnographer, folklorist, art historian, literary scholar, educator and museum expert, who flourished in the Russian Empire, Ukrainian People's Republic, and Soviet Ukraine.

Sumtsov was a champion and defender of the culture and language of Ukraine in both academic and popular realms, and contributed to a systematic history of Ukrainian literature. He delivered the first Ukrainian-language university lecture during a decades-long imperial ban, and established the H.S. Skovoroda Museum of Sloboda Ukraine (in 2015, renamed M. F. Sumtsov Kharkiv Historical Museum after its founder).

== Life and career ==
Mykola Sumtsov was born into a noble family, descendants of Cossacks. His father, Fyodor Ivanovich Sumtsov, worked in the Imperial Ministry of Finance in St. Petersburg, and after his retirement in 1856, moved to Kharkiv, where he died the same year. Sumtsov's mother, Anna Ivanovna, brought him up on her own. She had thorough knowledge of traditions and customs of Sloboda Ukraine as well as folk medicine. It was Anna Ivanovna, who inspired and supported his interest in folklore and traditions.

He studied at the 2nd Kharkiv Boys Gymnasium (high school), which he graduated with silver medal. The native Russian-speaker learned French and German in the gymnasium, and taught himself Ukrainian. Afterwards, he graduated History and Philology Faculty at Kharkiv University (1871–1875). In 1876 he undertook several courses at Heidelberg University, Germany. In 1878 Sumtsov returned to Kharkiv as a lecturer of Russian Literature. Supported by his mentor, Alexander Potebnja, he dedicated his introductory lecture to Ukrainian duma (Cossack epic song).

In 1880, he defended his Master thesis On the Wedding Rites, Mainly Russian. In 1885 Sumtsov was awarded a PhD degree for his thesis Khleb v Obriadakh i Pesniakh (Bread in Rituals and Songs) and in 1888 he was appointed professor.

In 1902, the 12th Archaeological Congress was held from August 15 to 27 in Kharkiv, organised by the Kharkiv Historical and Philological Society, chaired by Mykola Sumtsov. At the congress he organised an ethnographic exhibition consisting of impressive 26 sections and 1,490 artefacts. That exhibition became the foundation of Kharkiv University Ethnographic Museum, with Sumtsov as first curator from 1905 to 1918.

One of the most notable of Mykola Sumtsov's activities in support of the Ukrainian national movement was his public lecture in Ukrainian on 28 September 1907, when the ban on using Ukrainian in Ukraine had not yet been lifted.

In 1916, the Russian Geographical Society awarded Mykola Sumtsov a gold medal.

In 1917, Mykola Sumtsov, along with other members of Special Committee of Kharkiv University Board, signed an appeal to the government asking to allow free use of Ukrainian in all Kharkiv institutions.

One of the last projects undertaken by Mykola Sumtsov in 1920 to 1922 was overseeing gathering information on the local kobzars and their songs for the Gregory Skovoroda Museum of Sloboda Ukraine (now — M. F. Sumtsov Kharkiv Historical Museum).

== Publications ==
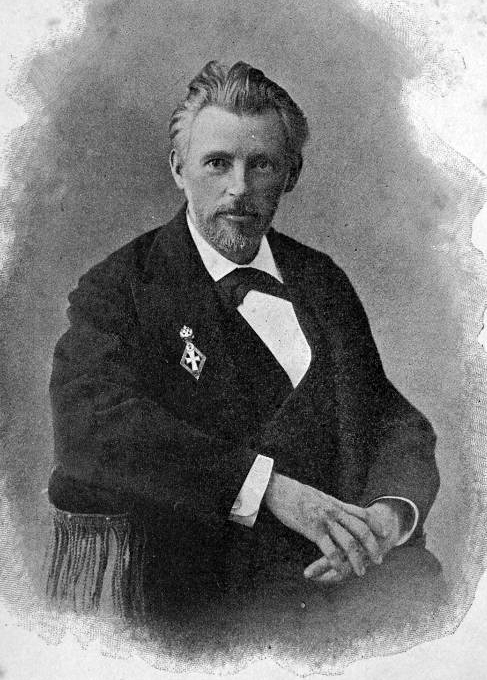
Mykola Sumtsov

Mykola Sumtsov wrote extensively. The bibliography of his known works contains 1,544 entries. His writings mainly concern two areas of science: ethnography and literature. In addition to the local periodicals, his works were also published in Bulgarian, Polish, Bohemian, German and French academic publications.

=== Ethnographic works ===
- 1881 – O brachnykh obriadakh, preimushchestvenno russkikh [On the Wedding Rites, Mainly Russian]
- 1885 – Khleb v Obriadakh i Pesniakh [Bread in rituals and songs]
- 1886 – articles on Koliadky [carols] in Kievskaia Starina
- 1889–1890 – articles on cultural experiences in Kievskaia Starina
- 1891 – articles on Pysanky in Kievskaia Starina
- 1898 – Razyskaniia v oblasti anekdoticheskoi literatury [Research in the field of anecdotal literature]
- 1902 – Ocherki Narodnogo Byta [Sketches of folk life]
- 1918 – Slobozhane: Istorychno-Etnohrafichna Rozvidka [The Sloboda Ukrainians: a historico-ethnographic study]

=== Literary works ===
Sumtsov's numerous literary publications include a range of articles dedicated to writings of renowned poets and writers, including Ivan Franko, Borys Hrinchenko, Ivan Manzhura, Oleksandr Oles, Vladimir Odoyevsky (See: Prince Odoyevsky. Moscow, 1884), Nikolay Nekrasov, Nikolay Gogol, Leo Tolstoy, Vasily Zhukovsky and Alexander Pushkin (See: Etudes about A. S. Pushkin. Moscow 1897). Sumtsov is also known as the author of a detailed research on the history of Cossack baroque thinkers, theologians and poets like Ivan Vyshensky, Lazar Baranovych, Ioanikii Galiatovsky, and Innokentii Gizel (See: On the history of literature in Southern Russia of the 17th century, in original: K istorii iuzhnorusskoi literatury semnadtsatogo stoletiia. Kharkiv, 1885). The works Sumtsov's also include literary publications on Ukrainian thinkers like Ivan Kotliarevsky, Taras Shevchenko, Panteleimon Kulish, Mykhailo Starytsky and Alexander Potebnja.

== Membership ==
- 1880–1896 – Kharkiv Historical and Philological Society, secretary
- 1897–1919 – Kharkiv Historical and Philological Society, president
- 1905 – Russian Academy of Sciences, corresponding member
- 1908 – Shevchenko Scientific Society, full member
- 1919 – All-Ukrainian Academy of Sciences, full member

== Selected works ==
- An Essay on the History of the Witchcraft in Europe. Kharkiv University, 1878. (in Rus.)
- On the Wedding Rites, Mainly Russian. Kharkiv University, 1881. (in Rus.)
- Prince V. F. Odoyevsky. Moscow, 1884. (in Rus.)
- Khleb v obriadakh i pesniakh (Bread in [Folk] Rituals and Songs), 1885. (in Rus.)
- Research on Koliadki and Shchedrivki. Kiev, 1886. (in Rus.)
- Raven in the Folk Literature. Moscow, 1890. (in Rus.)
- Contemporary Malorussian Ethnography. Kiev, 1893–1897. (in Rus.)
- On the Influence of Malorussian Scholastic Literature of the Seventeenth Century at the Great-Russian Old Believers Literature of the Eighteenth Century, and on the Reflection of Masonry // Kievskaya starina. 1895, vol. 51, No 12, Dep. 1, pp. 367–379. (in Rus.)
- On the Bibliography of Old Malorussian Religious Tales. Kharkiv University, 1896. (in Rus.)
- Razyskaniia v oblasti anekdoticheskoi literatury (Research in the Field of Anecdotal Literature), 1898. (in Rus.)
- Ocherki narodnogo byta (Sketches of Folk Life: From the 1901 Ethnographical Excursion to the Okhtyrka District of the Kharkiv Governorate), Kharkiv University, 1902. (in Rus.)
