= Ivan Mazepa's Hetman's Banner =

Ivan Mazepa's Hetman's Banner symbolized the highest Cossack power in Ukraine. The banner was meant for the Ukrainian Hetman, Ivan Samoylovych in the Kremlin in Moscow in the years 1686-1688. After removing him from power, the banner was granted to Hetman Ivan Mazepa. After the Battle of Poltava in 1709, the banner was passed to Hetman Ivan Skoropadsky.
The original area of the banner was 6 m^{2} (65 sq ft). It was made of white and yellow silk damasks and painted and gilded on both sides. The banner is stored at the Historical Museum in Kharkiv. From September 2007 to September 2008, conservators from the National Museum in Kraków, Poland set themselves a prestigious task of saving this artifact. The banner was prepared for the exhibition "Ukraine-Sweden: at the Crossroads of History (17th to 18th Centuries)." Ivan Mazepa's Hetman's Banner is one of the only three Cossack banners in the world (the second one is in Moscow, the third is in Stockholm).

== Gallery ==
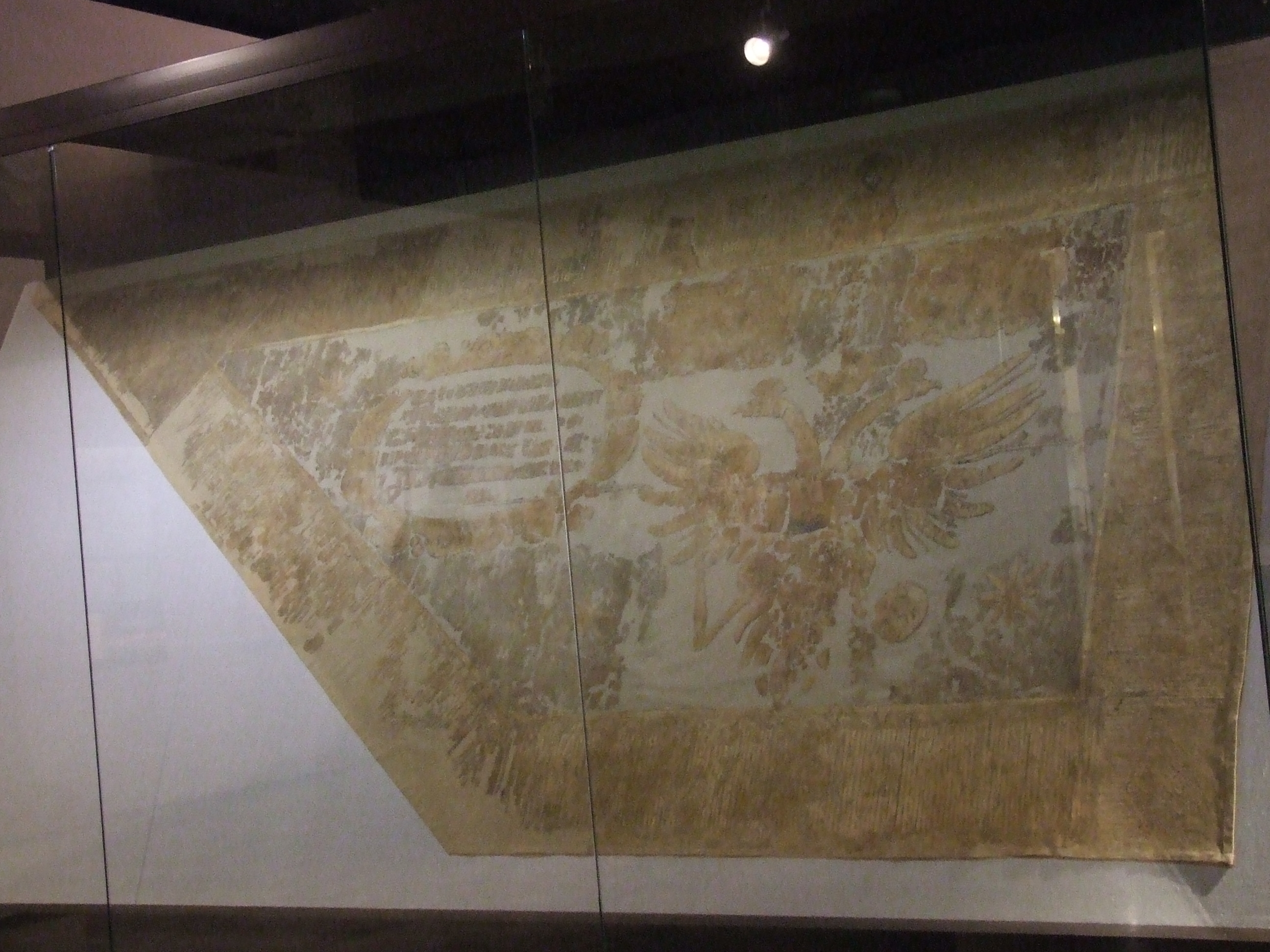

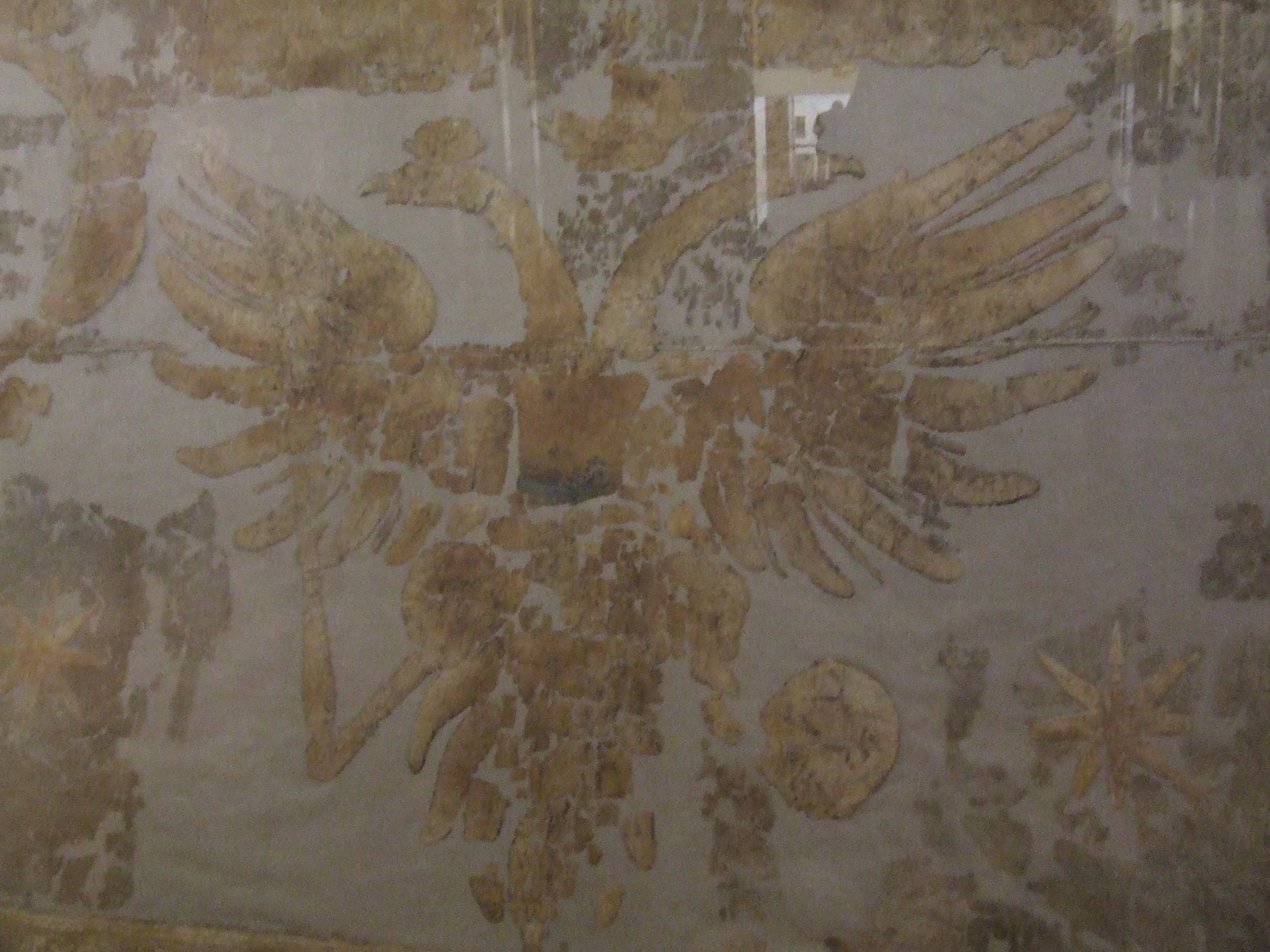
