= M. F. Sumtsov Kharkiv Historical Museum =

- Харківський історичний музей імені М. Ф. Сумцова
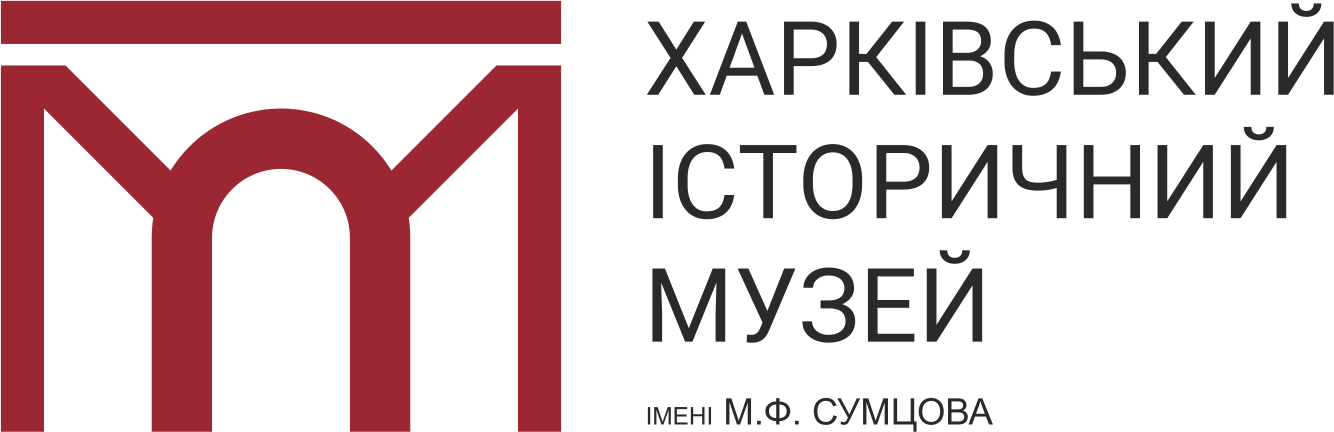

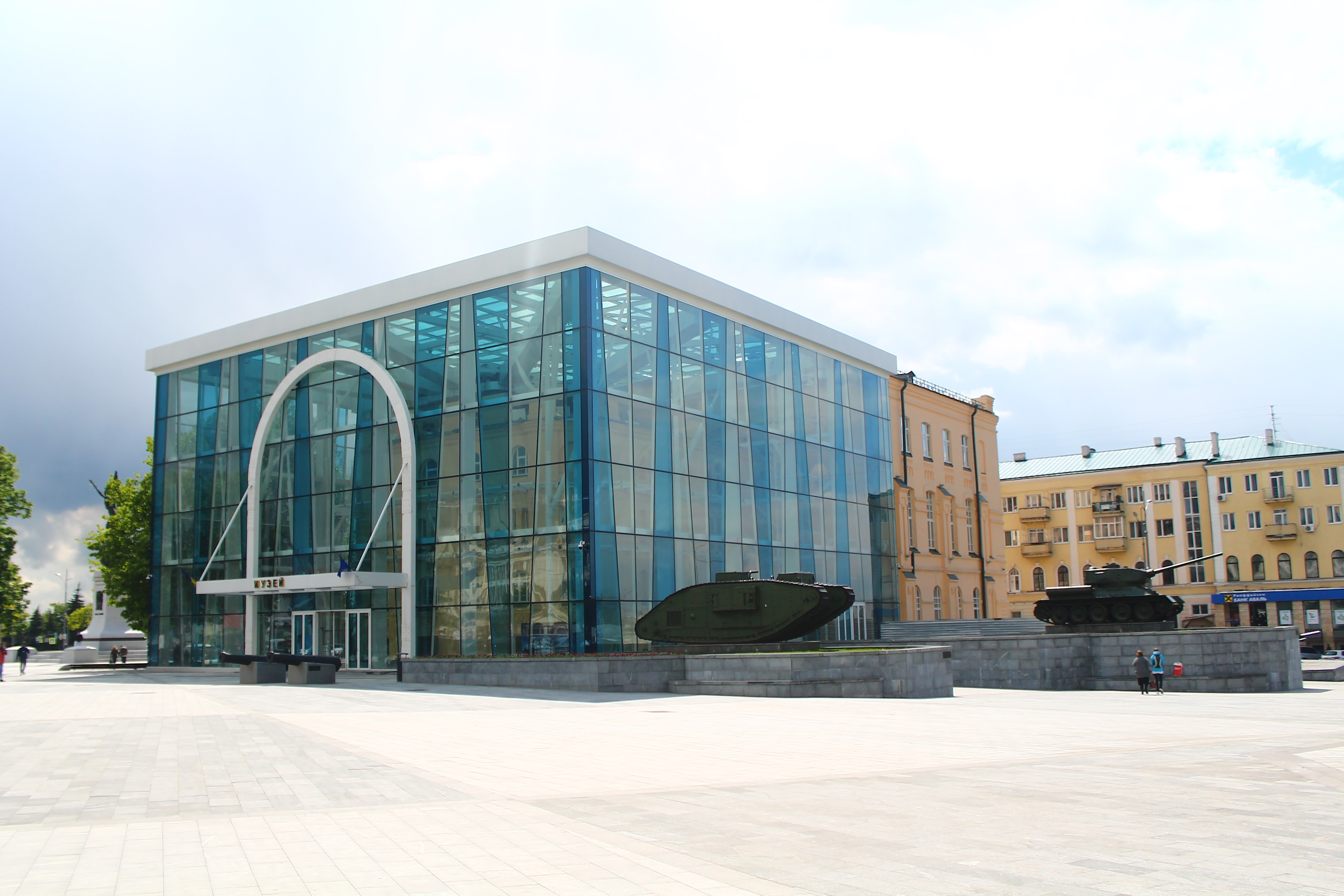
- Former name: Museum of Sloboda Ukraine
- Established: 21 January 1920; 106 years ago
- Location: Universytetska Street; Kharkiv, Ukraine
- Coordinates: 49.9925°N 36.2305°E
- Type: History museum
- Collection size: approx. 330,000 objects
- Founder: Mykola Sumtsov
- Director: Volodymyr Tsyhulov
- Owner: Kharkiv Oblast Council
- Public transit access: Istorychnyi Muzei (Kharkiv Metro); Maidan Konstytutsii (Kharkiv Metro)
- Website: museum.kh.ua

Immovable Monument of Local Significance of Ukraine
- Official name: «Ломбард» (Pawnshop)
- Type: Urban Planning, Architecture
- Reference no.: 7440-Ха

The M. F. Sumtsov Kharkiv Historical Museum (Ukrainian: Харківський історичний музей імені М. Ф. Сумцова, Kharkivskyi Istorychnyi Muzei Imeni M. F. Sumtsova) is a history museum located in Kharkiv, Ukraine. Its dedicated to history and culture of Ukraine and ethnicities living here.

== History ==
The museum was established in 1920 by Mykola Sumtsov as the Museum of the Sloboda Ukraine (Музей Слобідської України). It got the best collections from Kharkiv University Museum and the city Art and Industry Museum.

The collection of Kharkiv University Museum started to accumulate in 1804. Its objects were used for students teaching. This collection was one of the first museum collections in Ukraine. The city Art and Industry Museum was founded in 1886. Its ethnographic collection was one of the largest and best among all city museums in Russian Empire. In 1902 the nationwide Archaeological Congress was held in Kharkiv. A huge previous search work was conducted. There were collected a large number of valuable objects of history, ethnography, art that revealed history and culture of inhabitants of the region. For participants of the Congress the exhibitions were created to demonstrate these objects. Later most of the objects became a part of the collection of M.F. Sumtsov Kharkiv Historical Museum. The World War II was a heavy blow to the museum's collections. At this time a significant part of the collection has been lost.

On June 18, 2015, the museum was named after its founder and first director — Mykola Sumtsov. Today the M. F. Sumtsov Kharkiv Historical Museum retains the significance of the research, scientific-methodical and cultural-educational center of Kharkiv Oblast.

== Exhibitions ==
- Archeology of the Kharkiv region
- Kharkiv region during middle ages and cossack era
- Ethnic traditions of the Kharkiv region
- Cossack era in ukrainian history
- Kharkiv during 19th century
- Kharkivites on the fronts of World War I (1914–1918)
- Kharkiv region in the Revolution of 1917 and interwar period (1917–1940)
- World War ІІ
- Kharkiv in Soviet time, 1943–1991
- Antiterrorist operation and Kharkiv region

== Gallery ==
=== Kurgan steles in M. F. Sumtsov Kharkiv Historical Museum ===
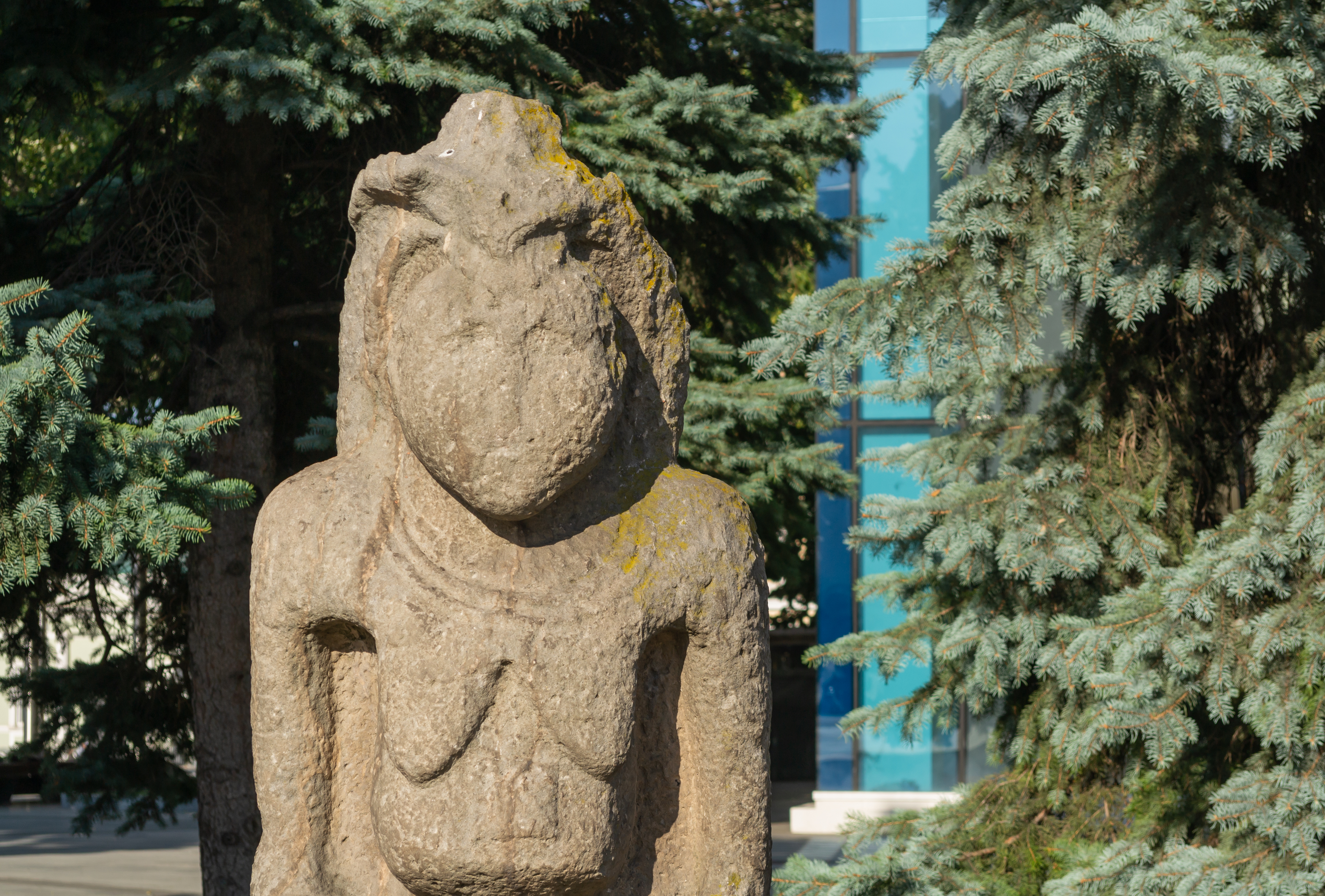
Cuman Statue (second from the left) on Constitution Square in Kharkiv.

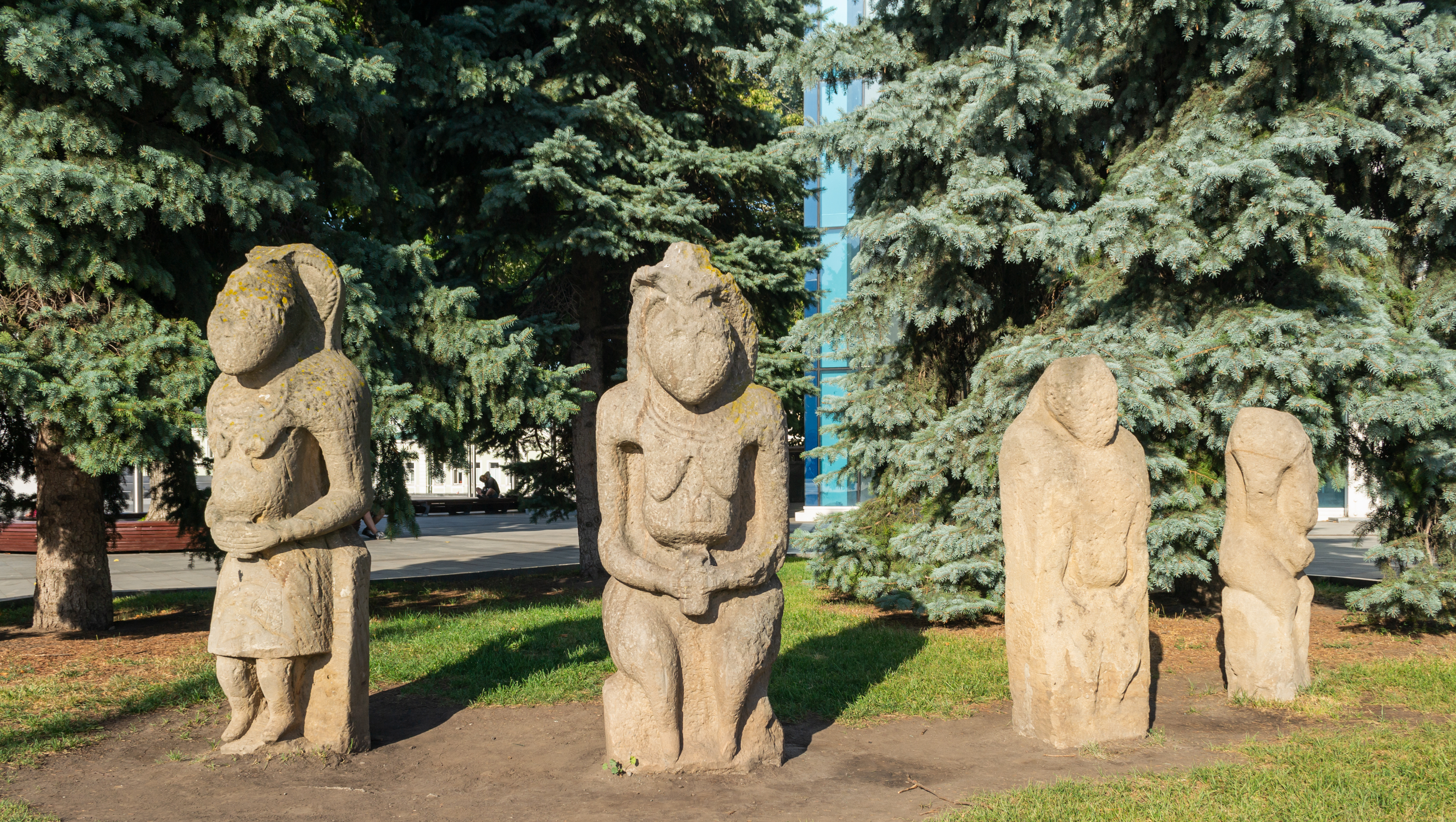
Cuman Statues on Constitution Square in Kharkiv.

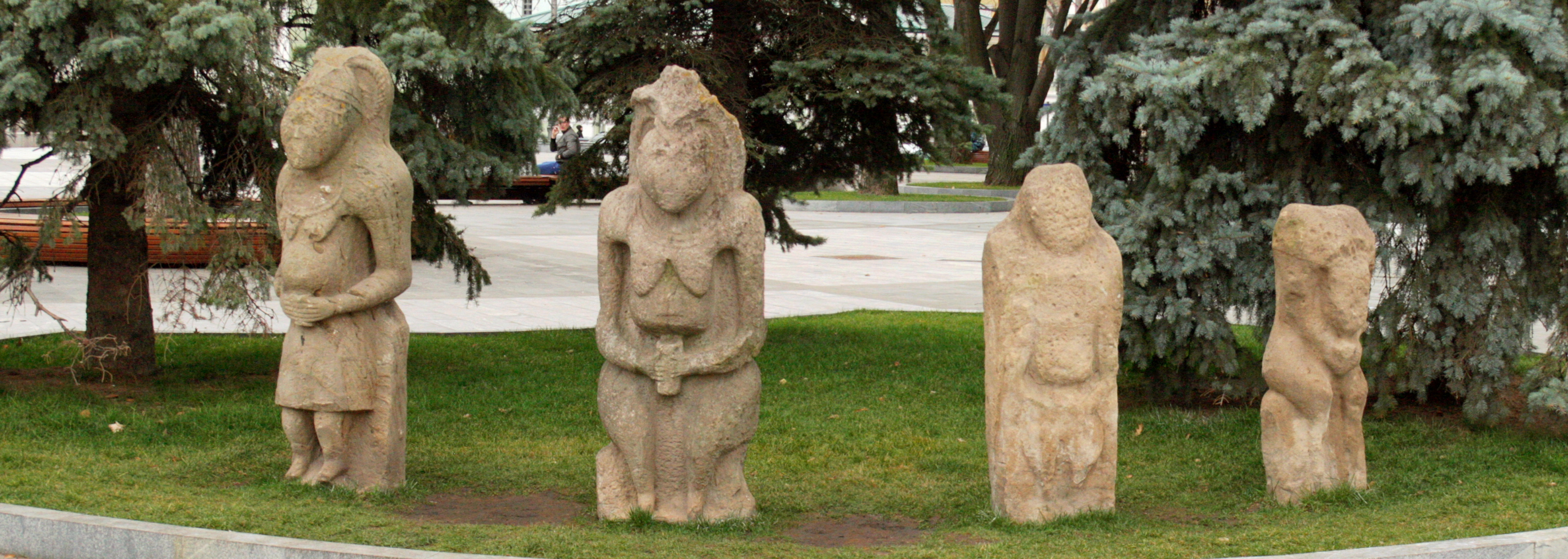
Polovtsian women on the square Constitutions in Kharkov

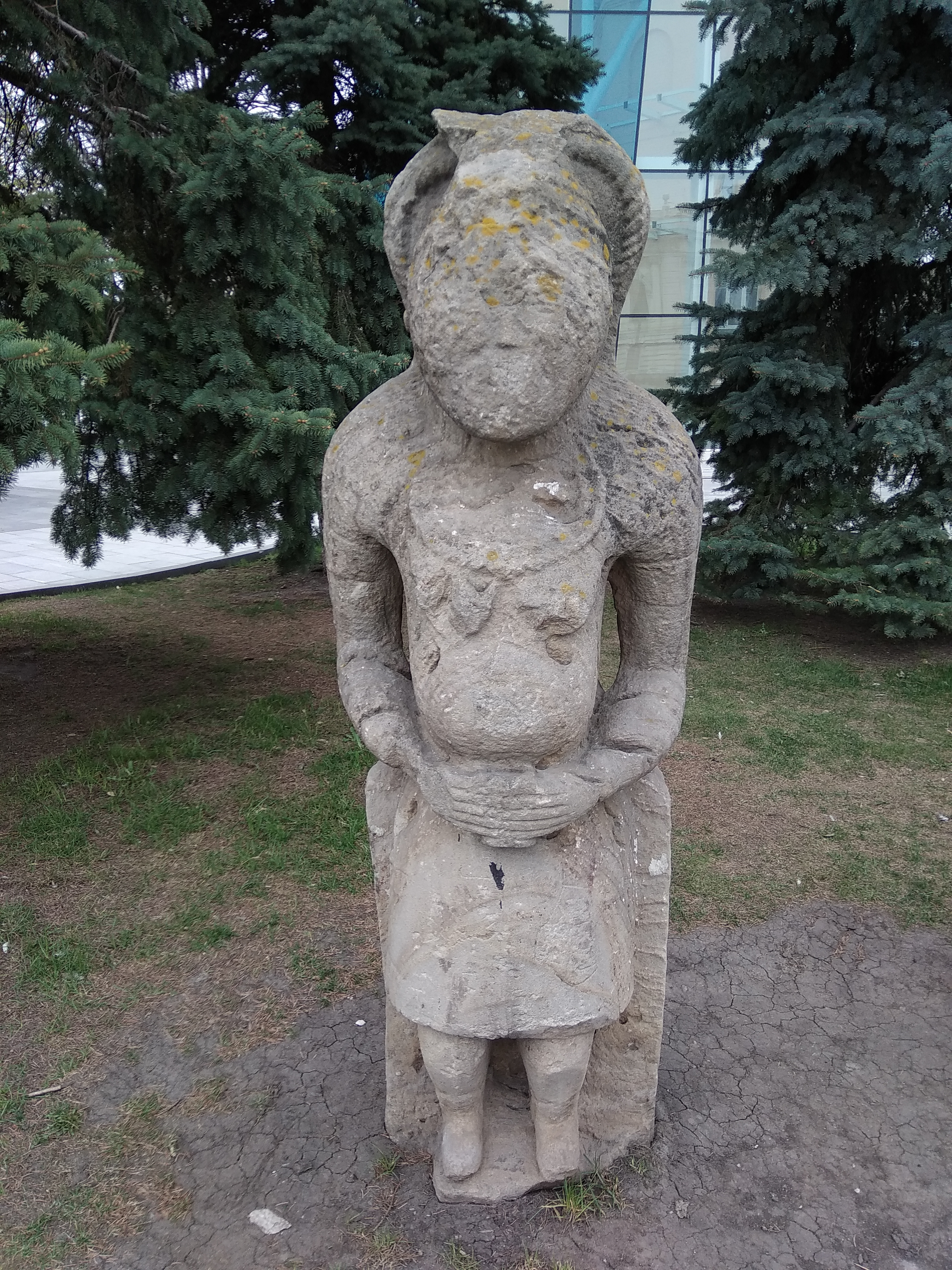
Next to the Kharkiv Historical Museum named after M.F. Four Polovtsian stone statues - balbals ("Polovtsian women"), created in the 12th century, were installed in Sumtsov. The statues were found on the territory of the Kharkiv region. One of the statues was found in pre-revolutionary times, two - in the 1930s, and one was found by employees of the archeology department of the historical museum as a result of archaeological research in the Loziv district in 1980 at the bottom of the Britai River.

=== Paintings by Ilya Yefimovich Repin in the M. F. Sumtsov Kharkiv Historical Museum ===
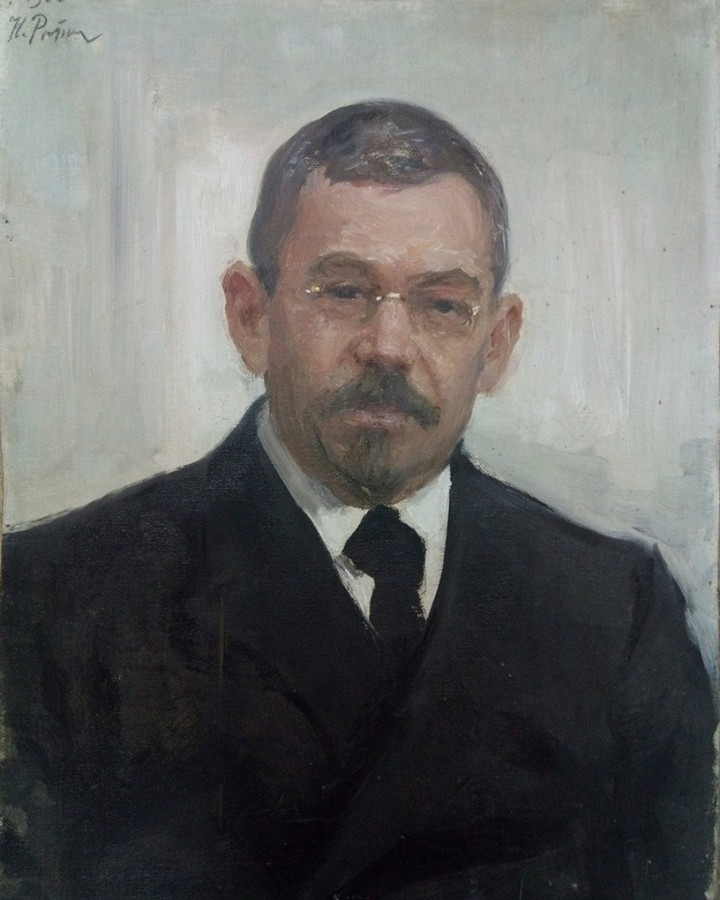
Portrait of Dmytro Bagaliya by Ilya Repin, in 1906

== See also ==
- Mykola Sumtsov
- Ivan Mazepa's Hetman's Banner
