= Kharkiv Art Museum =

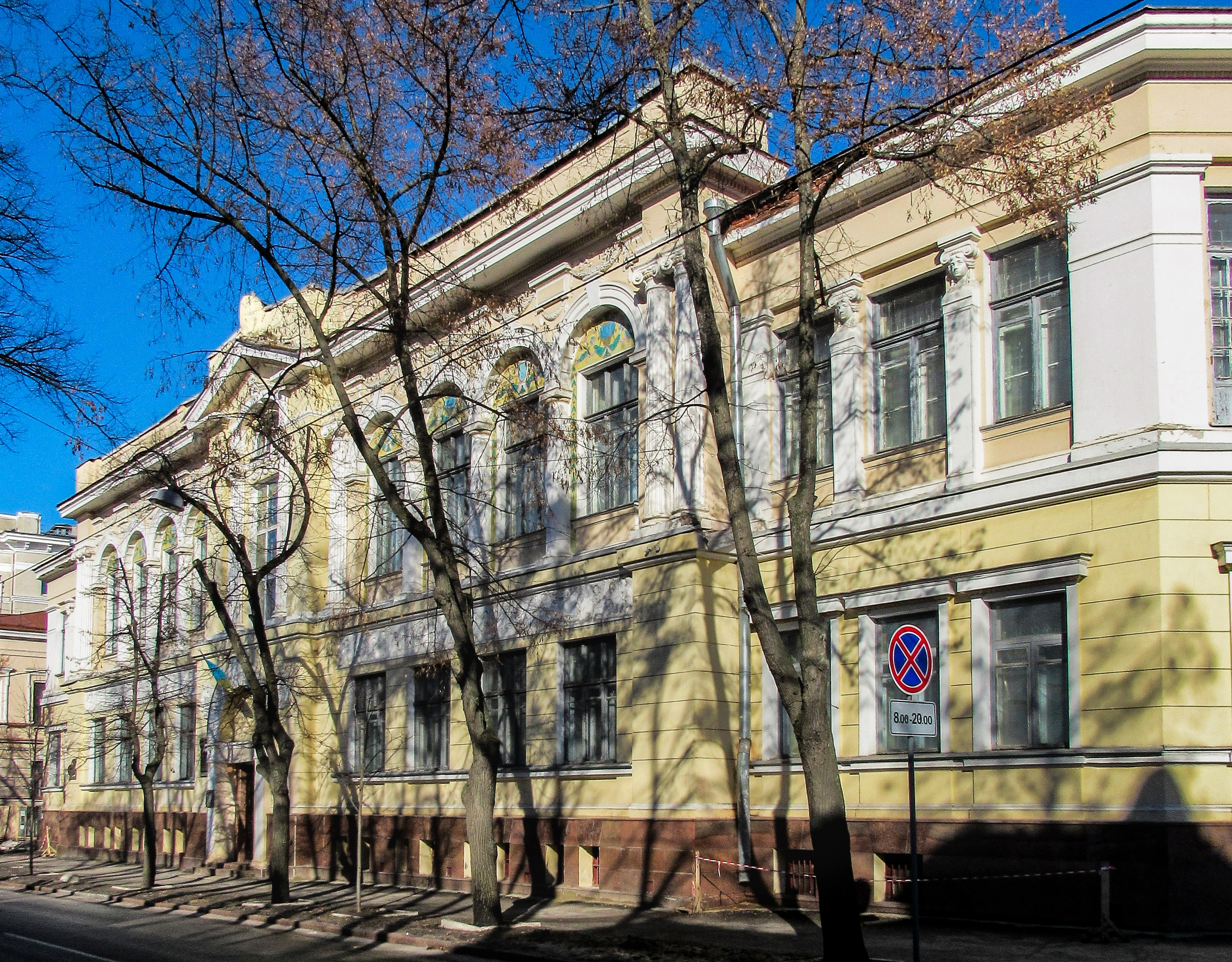
- Established: 1920
- Location: Kharkiv, Ukraine
- Coordinates: 49°59′56.72638″N 36°14′18.75638″E
- Type: Art museum
- Architect: Oleksiy Beketov
- Website: artmuseum.kh.ua

Immovable Monument of Local Significance of Ukraine
- Official name: «Музей» (Museum)
- Type: Urban Planning, Architecture
- Reference no.: 7087-Ха

The Kharkiv Art Museum (Ukrainian: Харківський художній музей) is one of the largest collections of fine and applied arts in Kharkiv, Ukraine, a state museum.

The Kharkiv Art Museum is located at 11, Zhon Myronosyts Street. The museum is located in a former millionaire industrialist’s mansion, which was constructed as the Ignatyschev family’s residence in 1912.

== History ==
The Kharkiv Art Museum was founded in 1905 and was originally called the City Art and Industry Museum. The Kharkiv historian Dmytro Bahalii headed the commission for completing the new museum.

In 1907, at the personal request of Bahalii, Ilya Repin donated to the museum his portrait of General Mikhail Dragomirov.

In 1920 the museum was named the Church-Historical Museum. Its collection consisted of artworks from the Kharkiv and Volyn diocesan repositories and the collection of Kharkiv University.

In 1922, it was transformed into the Museum of Ukrainian Art and divided into 3 departments: painting, sculpture and architecture. In the painting department, samples of book graphics, a collection of icons of the 16th–19th centuries, as well as portrait, landscape and genre painting of the 18th–19th centuries were collected.

In the 1930s, the museum was closed to the public.

In 1944, it was re-opened under the name of the Museum of Ukrainian Art; in 1949–1965, it was called the State Museum of Fine Arts, before the current name was adopted.

On 2 and 8 March 2022, the museum building was damaged by Russian missile strikes near the site. The attacks damaged the façade, windows, and stained-glass elements. Some of the museum's most valuable exhibits were evacuated. On 31 December 2023, the building was again affected by a blast wave caused by another Russian attack.

On 14 June 2026, at 5:50 p.m., the Russian army carried out a direct strike on the building, reportedly using a Shahed-type unmanned aerial vehicle. The attack set the roof of the historic building on fire, shattered windows, and caused the collapse of the ceilings above the second floor. No injuries were reported. During the firefighting operation, emergency responders and city services, including the Mayor of Kharkiv, Ihor Terekhov, attempted to evacuate the museum's exhibits to a shelter. Some paintings were damaged by the explosion or destroyed by the fire. Firefighting efforts were temporarily suspended because of the threat of a repeated strike.

== Building ==
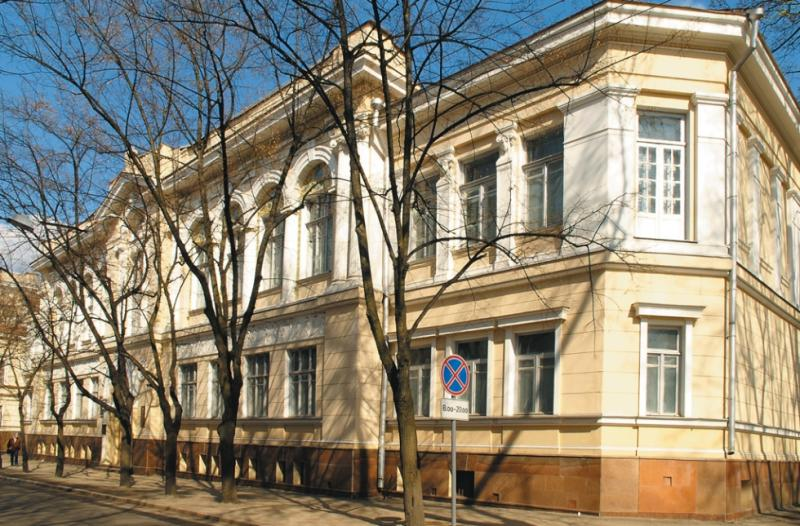
The building of the Kharkiv Art Museum

The building of the Kharkiv Art Museum is located at the address: Zhon Myronosyts Street, 11. It was built in 1912 according to the design of the Ukrainian architect and academician Oleksiy Beketov for the industrialist I. E. Ignatishchev, the owner of the Kharkiv Ivanovo brewery. The building is designed in a Neoclassicism style with Baroque and Art Nouveau elements. After the October Revolution and the establishment of Soviet power in Kharkiv, the residence was nationalized, and from 1922 to 1928, the Council of People's Commissars (SNK) of Ukraine, headed by the chairman of the Council of People's Commissars of the Ukrainian SSR Vlas Chubar, worked out of the building. After the SNK moved in 1928, the former Ignatishchev Mansion housed the Taras Shevchenko Institute (now the National Taras Shevchenko Museum in Kyiv) in the building of Derzhprom. In the post-war period, this building housed the Kharkiv Art Museum.

== Collection ==
Currently, works of pre-revolutionary Russian and Ukrainian art, art of the Soviet period, Western European art and arts and crafts of the 16th–20th centuries are exhibited in 25 halls of the Kharkiv Art Museum. The collection includes works by prominent Russian painters Karl Bryullov, Ivan Aivazovsky, Ivan Shishkin, Vasily Surikov, Vladimir Borovikovsky, Dmitry Levitzky, Nikolai Yaroshenko, Victor Borisov-Musatov and others. The Kharkiv Art Museum also houses the largest collection of works by Ilya Repin in Ukraine – 11 paintings (among them the famous Reply of the Zaporozhian Cossacks, a version of 1889–1893, transferred to Kharkiv Museum from the State Tretyakov Gallery in 1932) and 8 sheets of graphics. In addition, the museum has a rich collection of famous Ukrainian artists, including Taras Shevchenko, Serhii Vasylkivsky, Porfiry Martynovich, Mykhaylo Berkos, Mykhailo Tkachenko, Pyotr Levchenko and others. The museum's collections include about 25 thousand items of painting, graphics, sculpture, decorative and applied arts, which are stored here.

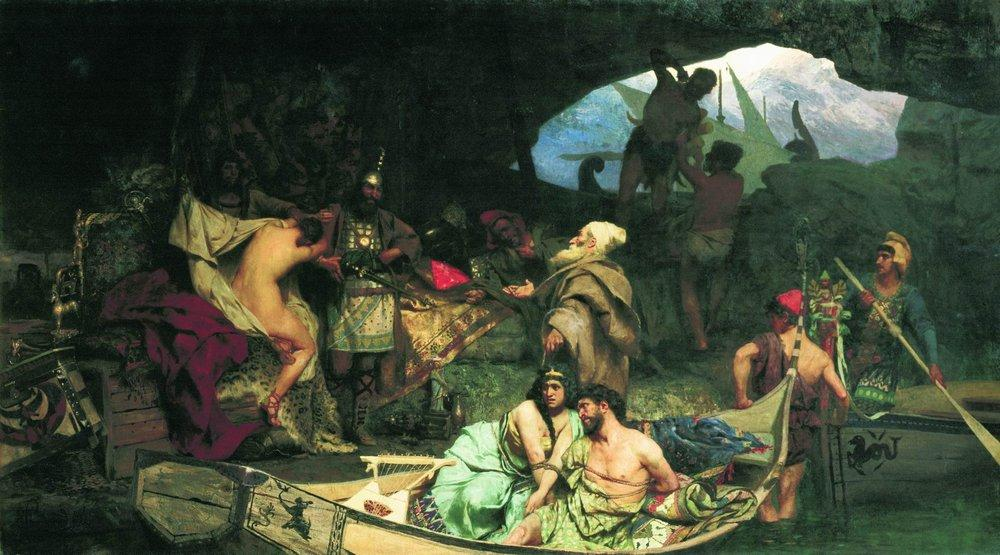
Henryk Siemiradzki, Isaurian Pirates Selling Booty, 1880

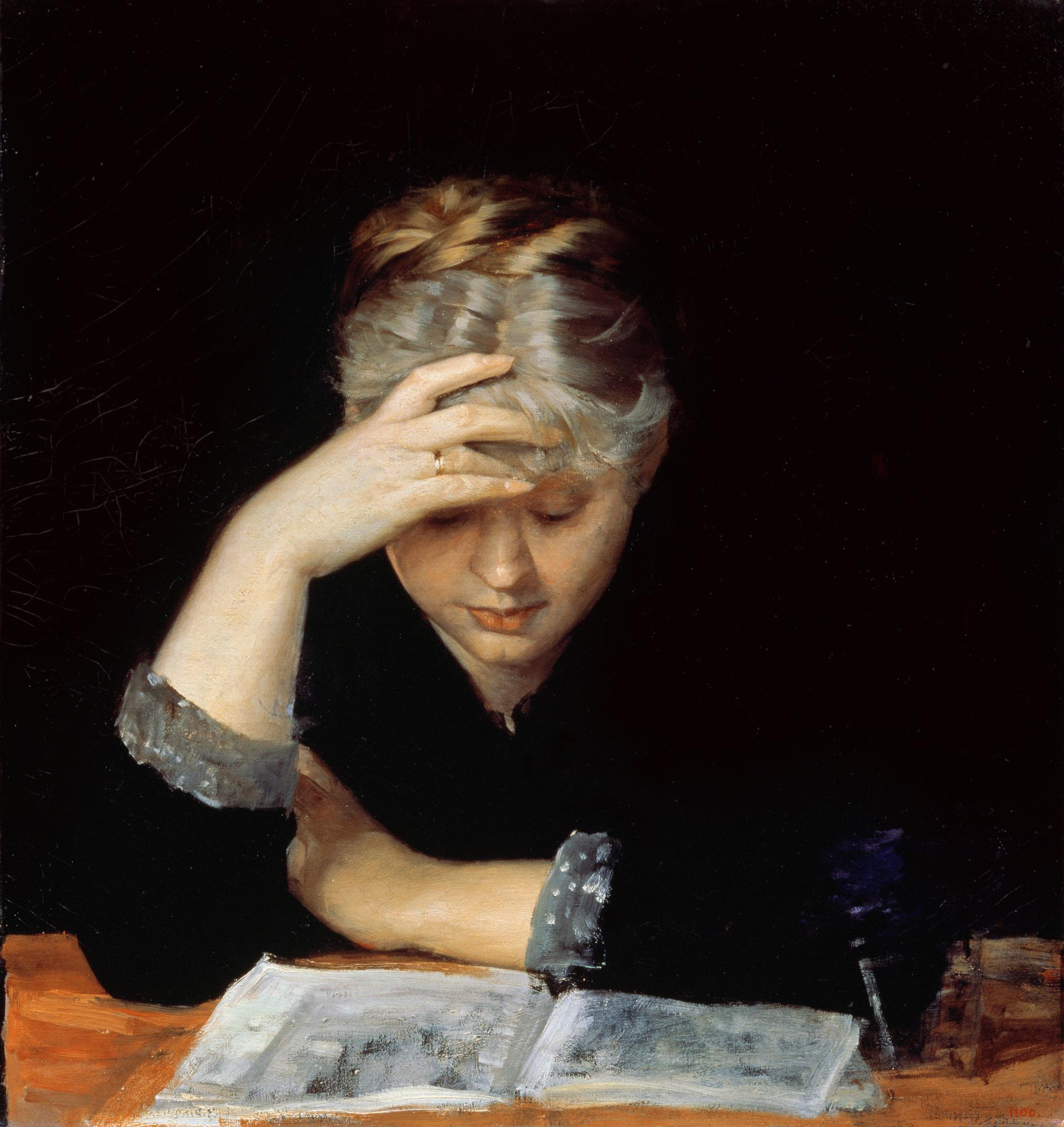
Marie Bashkirtseff, Behind the book, circa 1882

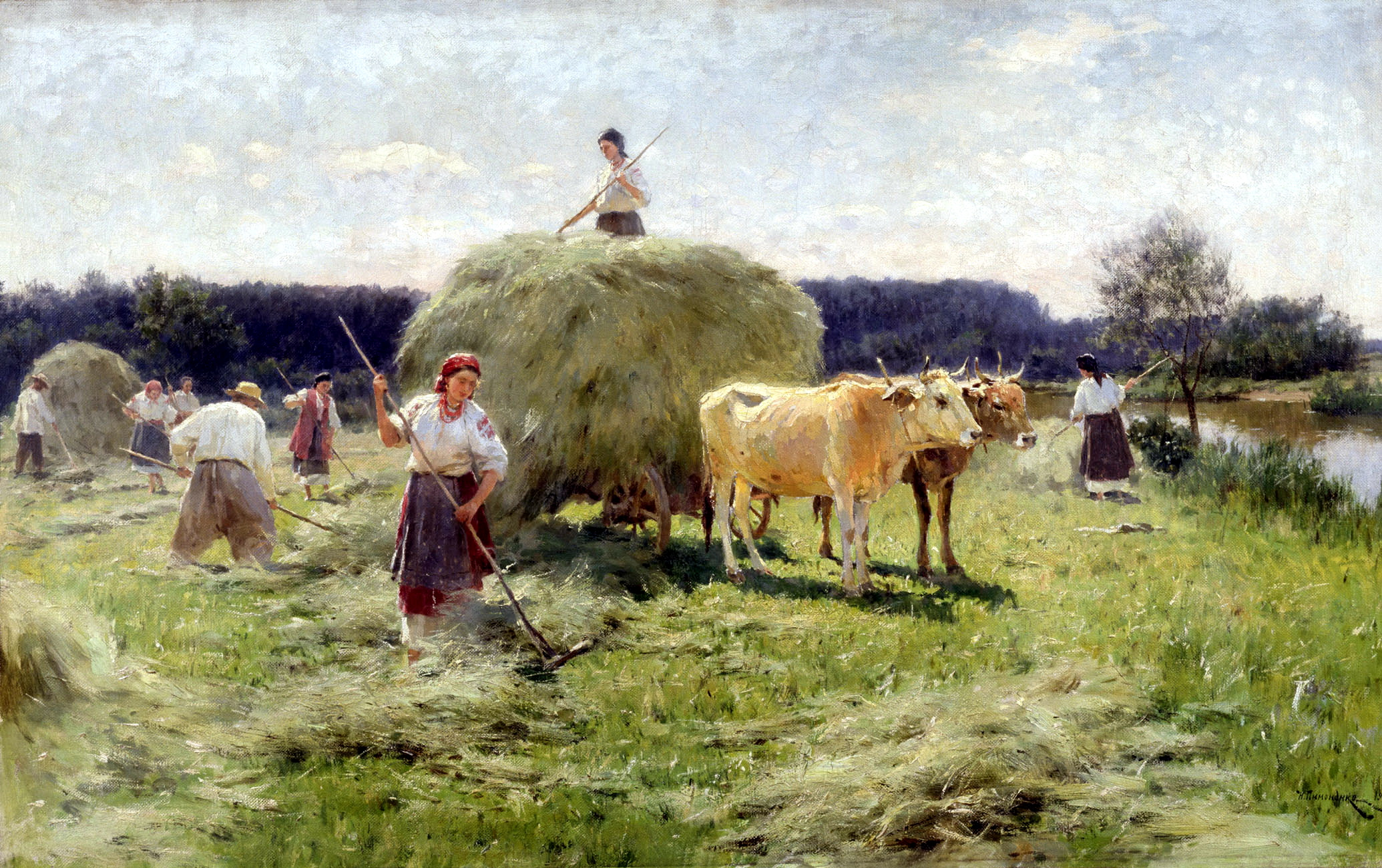
Mykola Pymonenko, Haymaking, circa 1912

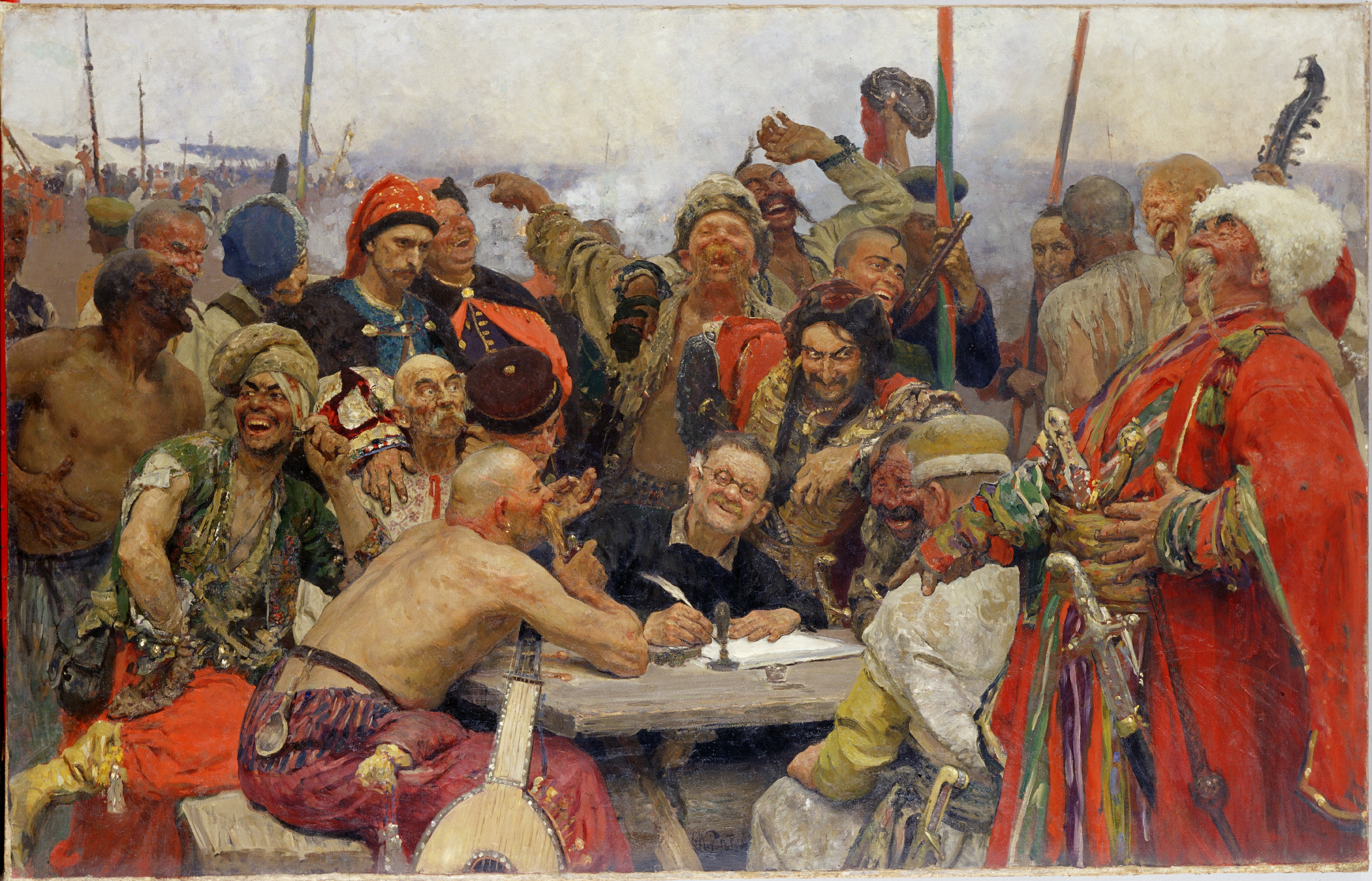
Ilya Repin, Reply of the Zaporozhian Cossacks, 1893. The second version of the painting

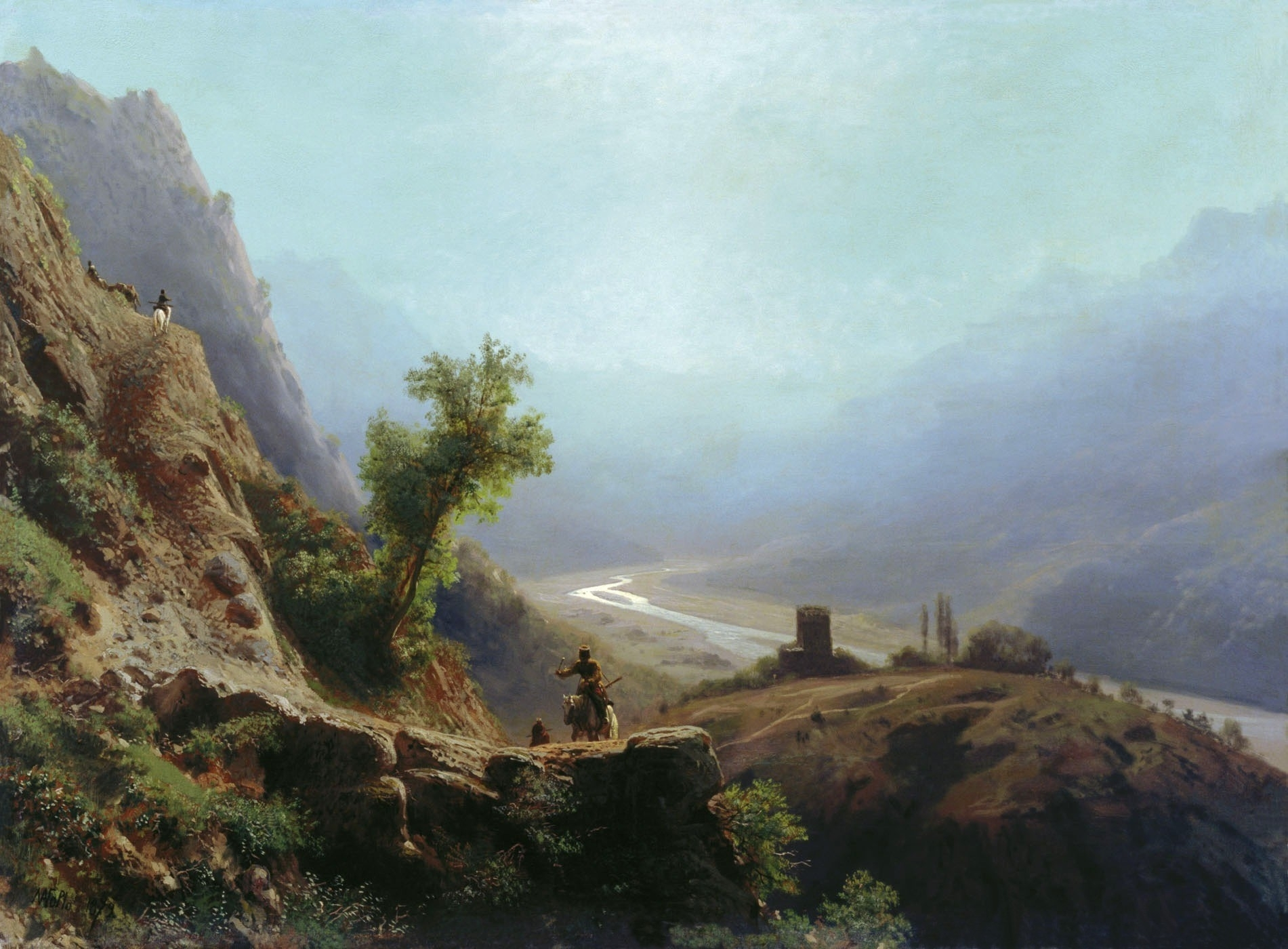
Lev Lagorio, In the mountains of the Caucasus, 1879
