= Stamenko Djurdjević =

Serbian sculptor (1888–1941)

Stamenko Đurđević (Serbian Cyrillic: Стаменко Ђурђевић; Krnjevo, near Velika Plana, Kingdom of Serbia, 19 November 1888 – Belgrade, Serbia, Kingdom of Yugoslavia, 7 April 1941) was a Serbian sculptor and author. Stamenko was one of several Serbian sculptors of his generation at the time, namely Živojin Lukić (1889–1934), Marko Brežanin (1885–1956), Dragomir Arambašić.

== Biography ==
Stamenko was the son of a farmer Miloje Đurđević and his wife, Anđelija. Besides Stamenko, the Đurđević couple had another son, Nebojša. Father Miloje was a well-known fruit-grower and their mother, a village herbalist. Stamenko married early, in his teens to Danica Radosavljević. They had three sons: Zoran, Nebojša and Miloje.

Even as a child, Stamenko showed promise in carving figures from wood. After finishing elementary schooling, he continued at a Gymnasium in Smederevo.

It was the sculptor Đorđe Jovanović who encouraged Stamenko to enroll at the Arts and Crafts School in Belgrade. By 1908, he already exhibited his work at a youth art exhibition, which was praised by critics. After a two- year study in Prague at the Royal Academy of Fine Arts under the tutelage of Professor Josef Drahoňovský from 1911–1913, he then left for Paris to enrol at the École nationale supérieure des Beaux-Arts in the class of Professor Antonin Mercié. His art training was interrupted in 1914 when he returned to Serbia to volunteer in the military. During which time he was captured and spent time in captivity.

In 1918 shortly after the war ended, he received a Serbian state stipend and went back to Paris to resume his interrupted art studies. There he fell ill and travelled to Czechoslovakia for treatment.

He returned to Belgrade to convalesce in 1920, and later went off to Paris once again. He finally came back from his travels abroad in 1922. The same year, he took part in an exhibition with Momir Korunović, in which he displayed 34 of his works, mostly portraits and busts of prominent and well-known public figures. Subsequently, in 1924, he exhibited his work alone, and the third display of his work was in Belgrade in 1926, with the Export Bank team. A span of twelve years was to elapse before he next displayed his work, which was in 1938, at the collective Exhibition of Workers‘ Cultural Activities, with Bogdan Popović, Milan Kašanin, Sreten Stojanović, and Milica Đukić-Topalović wrote reviews about his work, some of which were favourable and other critical.

== Sculpture ==
In the period between 1914 and 1941, he produced three public monuments, two in Belgrade and one in Debrljin. Only his Monument to the Third Call-Up and the same monument by another name—Third-line Conscripts—found in Karađorđe Park is still standing, while his monuments to Princess Zorka and King Peter I were destroyed by Communists after World War II.

In 1924 in Belgrade he held an exhibition of his works, mostly portraits of prominent Serbian characters and personages. His works are familiar to connoisseurs of art such as the busts of Princess Ljubica, Nikola Pašić, Peter I, Karađorđe, and others.

Some 10 of his portraits are preserved at the Belgrade New Cemetery and in Belgrade museums.

== Literary work ==
Stamenko Đurđević was also an author. He wrote poems, fairy tales, novels and dramatic plays. He published his first work in 1919. His published literary works include:

- The Mother Anđelija (1919), an epic poem;
- The Knight on a White Hose (1927), a legend;
- The Head of the Vožd;
- Across the Land, poems;
- Fairy Tale on the Lake (1933);
- Porna (1933);
- Semiramis (1933);
- Hellish Night, a novel; and
- Banović Strahinja, an epic tragedy in five acts (1935)

== Sources ==
- Veljko Petrović, Đurđević Stamenko, Narodna enciklopedija srpsko–hrvatsko–slovenačka, I knjiga, Zagreb 1928, str. 699.

== See also ==
- List of Serbian painters
- Dragomir Arambašić
- Jovan Pešić
- Đorđe Jovanović
- Risto Stijović
- Sreten Stojanović
- Simeon Roksandić
- Paško Vučetić
