= Paško Vučetić =

Serbian artist (1871–1925)

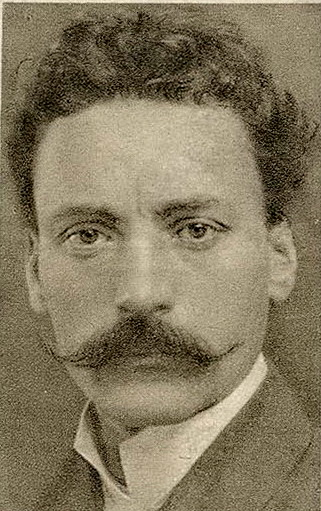
A photo of Vučetić

Paško Vučetić (Serbian Cyrillic: Пашко Вучетић; 1871 – 1925) was one of the two most prominent Dalmatian Serb artists of the first half of the 20th century.

== Biography ==
Paško Vučetić was born in Split, at the time in the Kingdom of Dalmatia. He completed his grade school and high school education in Split before leaving for Belgrade where he enrolled in an atelier run by Rista and Beta Vukanović, then he went to study in Trieste in 1886 and then in art academies in Venice (1893–1895) and Munich (1895–1898). At the end of the 19th century, he held his first exhibition in 1901 in Trieste. When the war First World War broke out he joined the Serbian Army and was assigned to paint the action on the battlefront. During the winter retreat of 1915 over the treacherous Albanian mountains, his health failed and he was forced to spend his convalescence at Corfu, and later in Italy, where he attended art schools in Florence and Rome (later at the Academy of Fine Arts in Munich, Germany). Although older than most of the war artists, Vučetić accepted their style and painted venues of Rome in 1916, which shine with orange buildings, blue sky and violet shades. His art also included sculpture and copying fresco paintings (as a member of the staff of the National Museum in Belgrade). Vučetić also assisted Nadežda Petrović in organizing the First Serbian Artists' Colony.

In 1909, Vučetić received the first prize in the competition for a monument to Karadjordje on Kalemegdan Park. The sculptural composition consisted of a mansion with a flag, soldiers, a woman with a child, Karadjordje's uprising and a guslar, bronze pieces were made in Rome and were assembled in Belgrade. The monument was originally located on Kalemegdan near the "Monument of Gratitude" to France. The ceremonial opening of the monument followed the Second Balkan War, however, in the next few years the monument was destroyed in 1916 during the Austrian occupation of Belgrade.

He exhibited his artworks as a part of Kingdom of Serbia's pavilion at International Exhibition of Art of 1911.

During the Balkan Wars and the First World War, Vučetić completed the cycle of "Belgrade Defense", several war-themed drawings and portraits of politicians and military leaders.

At the National Bank of Serbia he made decorative plastic, painted decoration of walls and vaults. In 1911, Vučetić was hired by Đorđe Vajfert to make an iconostasis for the original church of St. George in Bor. The church was moved to the village of Brestovac near Bor due to the extension of the surface mine. The only icon preserved from the original iconostasis is the icon of Holy Procopius. The icon depicts the founders of the Bor Mine, Đorđe Vajfert, his nephew Ferdinand Gramberg and Franjo Schistek. Apart from painting, sculpture, Vučetić was engaged in pedagogical work, for a time he worked at the National Museum in Belgrade. Many of Vučetić's paintings hang in the National Museum, some are in galleries and others are at auction houses.

He died in Belgrade, at the time in the Kingdom of Serbs, Croats and Slovenes.

== Gallery ==
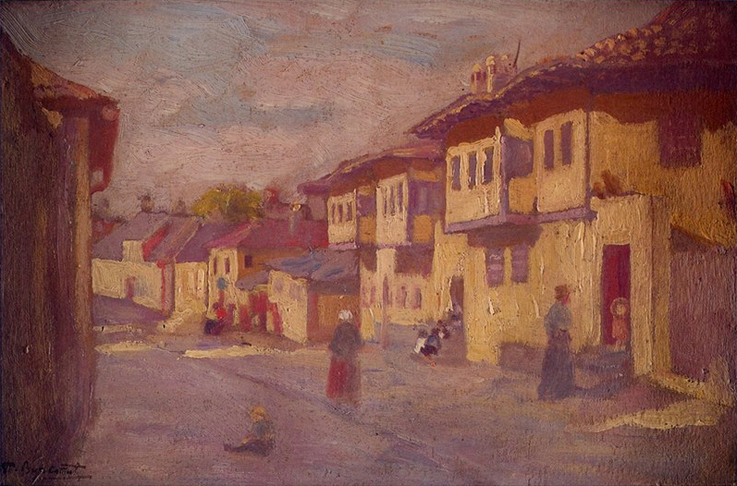
Entrance to a Jewish quarter, National museum in Niš, 1907

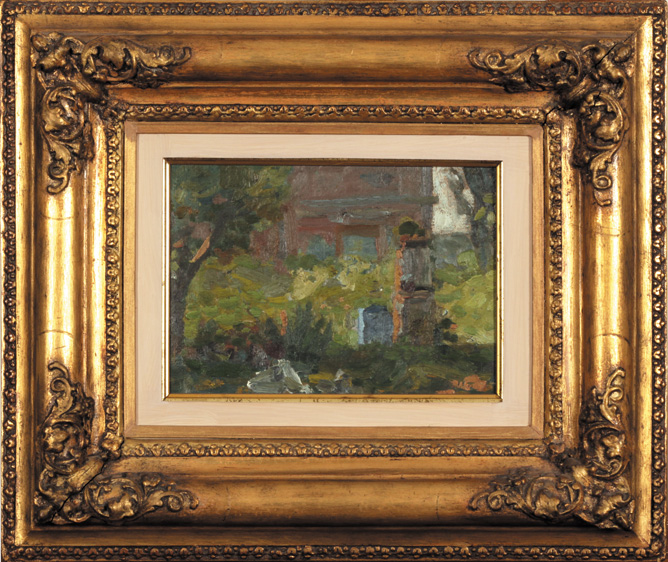
Monument in Porta, 1912

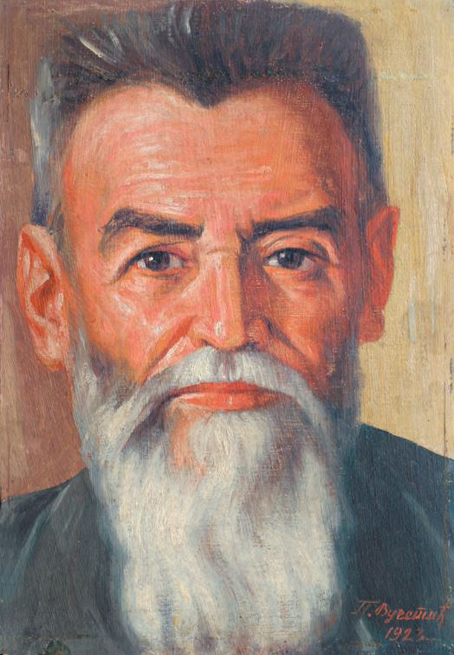
Portrait of Aca Stojanović, National museum in Niš, 1923

== See also ==
- List of Serbian painters
- Stamenko Djurdjević
- Dragomir Arambašić
- Jovan Pešić
- Đorđe Jovanović
- Risto Stijović
- Sreten Stojanović
- Simeon Roksandić
