= Djemo the Mountaineer =

Djemo the Mountaineer (Serbian: Ђемо Брђанин, Đemo Brđanin) is a popular legendary hero of Serbian epic poetry who is depicted as the enemy of Kraljević Marko and the brother of Musa Kesedžija. His figure might be based on an actual historical person. There are disputed claims that he was a member of the Muzaka noble family from Albania (Gjin Muzaka), or that he was the Ottoman soldier Jegen Osman Pasha. Some authors, such as Russian folklorist Khalansky, connected him with Svyatogor; this is disputed by other scholars.

== Etymology and alternative name forms ==
There are several theories for the origin of Djemo's name. According to one theory, Djemo was originally Dema, which is the diminutive of Demir, derived from the Turkish word for iron (Turkish: Demir). The other possibility is that his name is derived from the name of Osman Jegen Pasha (Jedjem — Djemo) who lived at the end of the 17th century. According to some scholars, his name is derived from the name of Gjin Muzaka, a member of the Muzaka noble family from Albania.

Djemo the Mountaineer is mentioned as Gino Latinin (Serbian: Џин од Латина) in the song 'Marriage of Stojan Popović'. Other forms of his name are Djino, Gino Arnauče, Dinče Arnauče and Gino Latinin (Serbian: džin od Latina), all names of the enemies of Prince Marko also in the songs collected by Miladinov brothers. These narratives clearly portray the character as a Roman Catholic, in contrast with his Muslim brother Musa, emphasizing a stereotypical view on the duality of Albanians, whose national identity is not as defined by religion as with the Balkan Slavs.

== Historical background ==
=== Yeğen Osman Pasha or Gjin Muzaki ===
Jovan Tomić in his work 'Who is Djemo the Mountaineer' (Serbian: Ко је Ђемо Брђанин) claims that Djemo was from the region of Brda, a territory in modern-day Montenegro and northern Albania. He thought that Musa Kesedžija is based on the supporter of Yeğen Osman Pasha while Jegen Pasha himself has been transformed into Djemo the Mountaineer (Serbian: Ђемо Брђанин) in Serbian epic poetry.

Andra Gavrilović disagreed with Tomić's opinion regarding Djemo in his polemic work 'Who wasn't Djemo the Mountaineer, correction of someone's literary-historical mistake' (Serbian: Ко није био Ђемо Брђанин, исправка туђе литерарно-историске грешке). He believed that Djemo was in fact Albanian nobleman Gjin Muzaki because he assumed that Serbian epic poetry about struggle between Marko Kraljević and Djemo the Mountaineer was based on the real struggle between Prince Marko and Muzaka family from Albania. Tomić replied that struggle between Marko and noble men from Albania was not so significant to be remembered or transferred into the epic poetry.

If the figure of Djemo the Mountaineer is indeed based on the figure of Gjin Muzaki, then Djemo and Musa Kesedžija are onomastic projections of the same person.

=== Svyatogor ===
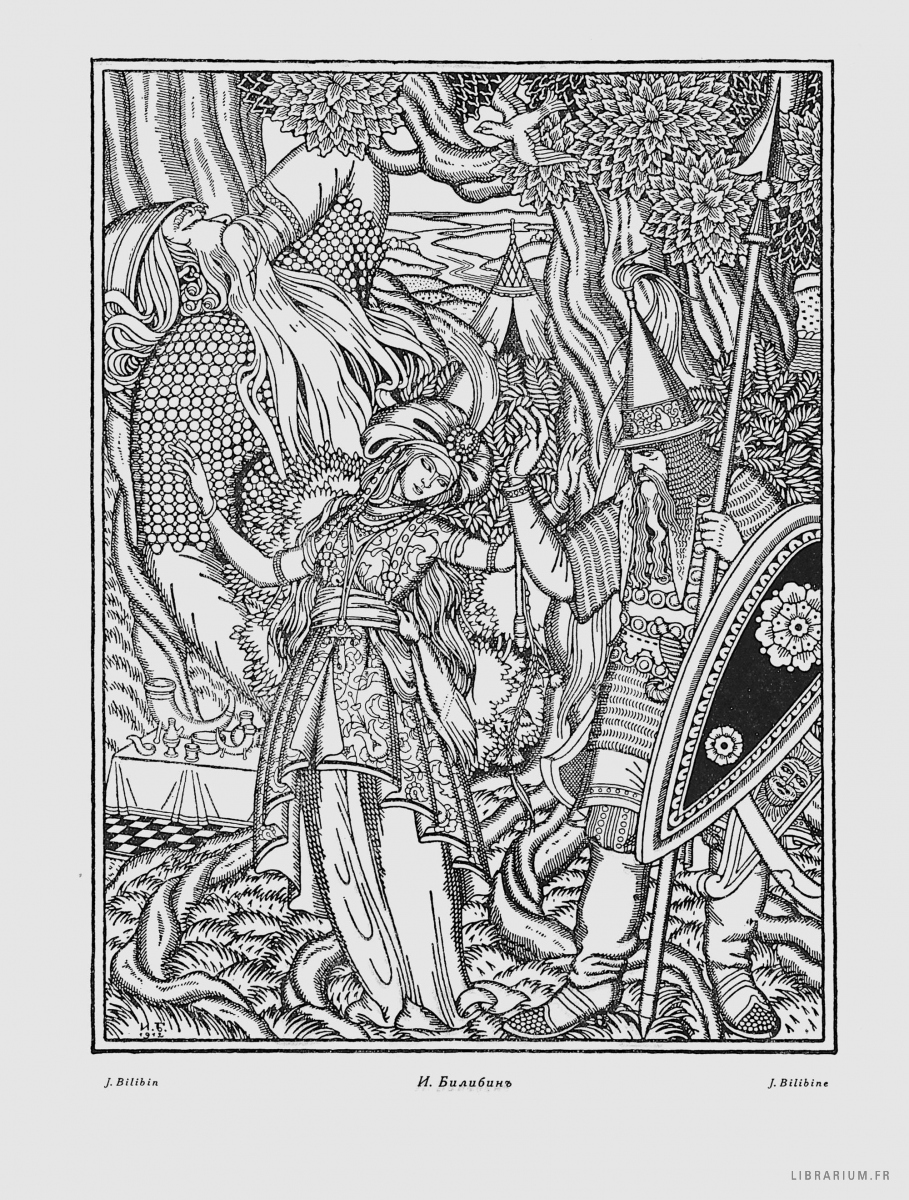
Illustration for the epic Ilya Muromets and Svyatogor's wife

Some authors, including Russian folklorist Khalansky, connected Djemo with Svyatogor. Similar to his brother Musa Kesedžija (another epic hero with demonic characteristics) Djemo is also depicted as seated on the horse and trowing his battle-mace to the clouds and catching it with his white hands (Serbian: на дорату ноге прекрстио, топузину баца у облаке, дочекује у бијеле руке) which is a scene found in song about Svyatogor (Russian: Сидит богатырь-от на добром́кони, Он мечет палку ту под облаки, До́земли не допускаючи, На белы́руки подхватаючи). Janja helped Marko Kraljević to capture Djemo which is another similarity with the songs about Svyatogor, i.e. to the adultery of Svyatigor's wife in the song about Ilya Muromets. Finally, the names of both Djemo the Mountaineer and Svyatogor have connection with the hills (Serbian: брдо; Ђемо Брђанин) and mountains (Russian: гора; Святого́р).

== Songs ==
=== Marko Kraljević and Djemo the Mountaineer ===
Djemo first appeared in the poem Marko Kraljević and Djemo Mountaineer, which was sung by Tešan Podrugović and recorded by Vuk Karadžić who published it in 1845 within the second volume of the 'Songs of Serbian people' (Serbian: Српске народне пјесме) collection.

In this song Marko Kraljević celebrates his slava (the Serbian Orthodox tradition of the ritual glorification of one's family's patron). He has to go to bring some fish from Lake Ohrid as requested by the monks who were his guests. Marko goes to bring some fish unarmed, as advised by his mother, Queen Yevrosima, who wanted to prevent him from committing a sin with his arms on family holiday. During his journey from Prilep to Ohrid unarmed Marko meets Djemo the Mountaineer, described in Serbian epic poetry as the brother of Musa Kesedžija, who captures him with intention to kill him to revenge the death of his brother Musa, killed by Marko. Djemo then takes captured Marko along the same route (Ohrid, Vučitrn, Zvečan) followed by historical Yegen Pasha during his raids against Christians. Population of those towns pay Djemo not to kill Marko in their towns, which is another similarity with historical events when they paid contributions and ransom money to Yegen Pasha. Another explanation is that they perceived Marko as dragon and according to the Serbian mythology the presence of the body of dead dragon can destroy crops. When Djemo becomes so thirsty that he intend to drink Marko's blood, Marko avoids that by ruse, advising Djemo to go to the nearby tavern kept by his good friend, a fishwife Yanya who frees Marko after first getting Djemo drunk. Marko then puts legcuffs to Djemo and takes return trip to Ohrid, returning money to citizens who paid Djemo not to kill Marko in their towns, although they offered more money to Marko just to kill the tyrant Djemo in their towns. Marko declines their offers and hangs Djemo near Ohrid. At the end of the song he returns to Prilep with the fish from Lake Ohrid.

=== Other songs ===
Djemo is also mentioned as džin Latinin in the song 'The marriage of Popović Stojan' published within the collection published by Vuk Karadžić.

== Notes ==
=== Footnotes ===
1. According to Banašević this motif is similar to the popular universal motif in the knightly medieval literature with its origin in the Le Moniage Guillaume legend in which monks are trying to get rid of Guillaume and his enormous appetite for drinking and eating by sending him to get some fish.

== Sources ==
- Popović, Tanya (1988). Prince Marko: the hero of South Slavic epics. Syracuse, N.Y.: Syracuse University Press. ISBN 978-0-8156-2444-8.
- Loma, Aleksandar (2008), Ljubinković, Nenad; Samardžija, Snežana (eds.), Srpsko usmeno stvaralaštvo (PDF), Belgrade: Institute for literature and arts, ISBN 9788670951389, OCLC 318065561
