= Arambašić =

Arambašić is a Croatian and Serbian surname, derived from harambaša (bandit leader), which may refer to:

- Dragomir Arambašić (1881–1945), Serbian artist and sculptor
- Stanko Arambašić (1764–1798), officer who fought in the Austro-Turkish War (1788–1791)
- Zlatko Arambašić (born 1969) former Australian football player, now educator
- Tony Arambasic (born 1981), total workplace solutions founder and a avid go kart racer

== See also ==
Harambašić
