= Kharkiv Linguistic School =

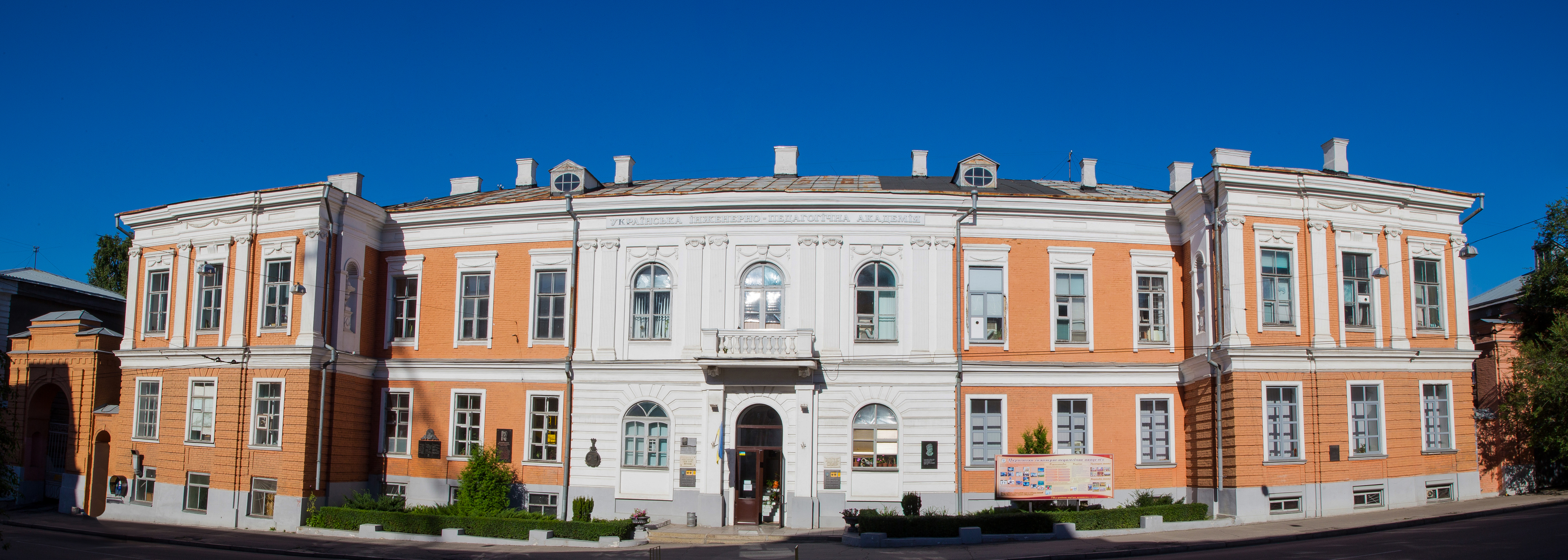
The old building of the Kharkiv University

The Kharkiv Linguistic School (Kharkiv School) is a group of academics, mainly philologists, linguists and literary scientists, led by Alexander Potebnja. The term "Kharkiv Linguistic School" incorporates several academic traditions such as the Kharkiv Psychological School, the Kharkiv School of Comparative Linguistics, the Kharkiv Philological School and others.

Kharkiv School was an interdisciplinary centre with academics working on linguistic theory, publishing teaching materials, collecting Ukrainian folklore, writing their own poems and plays, as well as advocating for the importance of Ukrainian language and culture.

== History ==
Soon after its foundation, Kharkiv became an important intellectual centre of the Sloboda Ukraine because of the Kharkiv Collegium, where Hryhorii Skovoroda worked. The Kharkiv School emerged in the Kharkiv University, which had been established in 1805 and has become one of the leading educational centres of the Russian Empire.

The history of the School can be divided into the preformative (1805—1874), formative (1874—1890s) and postformative periods. The latter history of the School is contested: Andrii Danylenko claims that it had ceased to exist in the middle of the 20th century but was revived after Ukraine gained its independence, while Tetyana Lysychenko believes that it continued throughout the Soviet period.

=== Preformative period ===
The groundwork for the future Kharkiv School was laid by linguists such as Izmail Sreznevsky, Pyotr Lavrovsky (Note: Ukrainian: Лавровський Петро Олексійович) and Ivan Pereverzev (Note: Ukrainian: Переверзєв Іван Афанасійович), who worked on periodisation and internal classification of Slavic languages and specifically the relationship between Russian, Ukrainian and Belarusian languages (which were commonly seen as dialects of the same language at that time). These academics published some of the first Ukrainian academic books and journals, such as Ukrayinsky visnyk, Ukrayinsky zhurnal (Note: Ukrainian: Український журнал, a literary and scientific journal published in 1824—1825), and articles defending the existence and validity of Ukrainian language.

The first rector of the Kharkiv University, Ivan Rizhsky (Note: Ukrainian: Рижський Іван Степанович, also known as Russian: Иван Степанович Рижский), Ilya Timkovsky (Note: Ukrainian: Тимковський Ілля Федорович, also known as Russian: Илья Фёдорович Тимковский) and Ivan Ornatovsky were other important predecessors. Timkovsky published the first periodisation of the Eastern branch of Slavic languages, while Ornatovsky's "An up-to-date outline of the Russian grammatical rules based on the principles of universal grammar" (Note: Russian: Новѣйшее начертаніе правилъ Российской грамматики, на началахъ всеобщей основанныхъ), published in 1810, introduced a distinction similar to de Saussure's "speech circuits", language, langue and parole, published later. He also notably considered Russian equal to the other "dialects of the Slavo-Russian language".

Many of these intellectuals were studying Ukrainian folklore and used current European scientific theories in their academic and literary work. By 1830s, Kharkiv philologists aimed to revive Ukrainian nationalism, published Ukrainian songs and other oral literature. Potebnja later cited such publications as his inspiration to become a linguist.

=== Formative period ===
The formative period began in 1874, when Alexander Potebnja became a professor of Russian language and literature in Kharkiv University. He created the School under the name "Kharkiv Historical-Philological Society" (Note: Ukrainian: Харківське історико-філологічне товариство, Russian: Харьковское историко-филологическое общество) in 1876 and became its leader. The School's main objective was to popularise contemporary achievements in its many academic fields.

Potebnja was an interdisciplinary scholar: a linguist and a literary scientist, a philosopher and a historian, whose early career included ethnographic work; when he founded the Kharkiv Linguistic School, it also incorporated many related disciplines at once, such as comparative linguistics, psycholinguistics, semasiology, and literary studies. He worked on poetics and philosophy of language (contrasting articulated sounds with meaning and the modality of transmission of the meaning into the sounds), composed a major systematic overview of Ukrainian phonology, proposed a theory of linguistic change being sped up by social change, becoming a pioneer of linguistic theory in Russian Empire, although in the West similar ideas were already being voiced by Wilhelm von Humboldt and Heymann Steinthal. Potebnja's groundbreaking work on history of Eastern Slavic languages postulated that Old East Slavic language existed as a singular unit, based on data on pleophony, nasal vowel development, combinations of consonants and yers, as well as the reflexes of *dj, *tj; he also came to the conclusion that Old East Slavic split from other members of the Slavic family before 11 century. Potebnja's views on the politics of Ukrainian language were ambiguous: he opposed the "proponents of the independence of the Little Russian language" while also expressing regret about the Russian influence on Ukrainian written language. Despite that, he was an education activist and created the "Manual for learning the grammar, composed for Ukrainian Sunday schools" (Note: Ukrainian: «Настанови до навчання грамоти, укладені для малоруських недільних шкіл, Russian: Руководство к обучению грамоте, составленное для малоруських воскресных школ) (1899), an alphabet book (1862) and a textbook (1899; it was not published during his lifetime due to the 1862 prohibition of Sunday schools).

Potebnja's closest follower and student, Aleksandr Popov (Note: Ukrainian: Попов Олександр Васильович), published only one book, "A comparative syntax of the nominative, vocative, and accusative cases in Sanskrit, Zend, Greek, Latin, German, Lithuanian, Latvian, and Slavic languages" (Note: Russian: Сравнительный синтаксис именительного, звательного и винительного падежей в Санскрите, Зенде, Греч., Лат., Литов., Латыш. и Славянских наречиях), but it had a big impact on Vadim Krysko, who largely based his study of the history of the syntax of the Russian language on Popov's ideas. Other followers of Potebnja are Mykola Sumtsov, Vasyl Khartsiyev and Oleksiy Vetukhiv (Note: Russian: Алексей Васильевич Ветухов).

=== Postformative period ===
The later history of the school is contested. One of the researchers of the Kharkiv Linguistic School, Olha Cheremska, assumes that all linguists and literature scholars working in Kharkiv at that time were members of the Kharkiv School, which Andrii Danylenko rejects. In either case, in the first third of the 20th century, Kharkiv Linguistic School gradually lost its influence because of the Soviet repressions targeting its members, as well as ideological incompatibility with the Soviet government.

The following linguists are considered to belong to the Kharkiv School in late 20th—early 21st centuries: comparative linguist and semasiologist Dmytro Ovsyanyko-Kulykovsky, Mytrofan Kolosov, Marin Drinov and Mikhail Khalansky; later they were joined by George Shevelov. Several other linguists sometimes being included, such as Oleksa Synyavsky, a proponent of Ukrainian language codification whose moderate approach contrasted with the one of Kyiv School purists such as Olena Kurylo, and the author of many studies of Slavic accentology, Leonid Bulakhovsky. Tetyana Lysychenko also lists many later academics and claims that they were continuing Potebnja's tradition. According to her, the School continued to exist in the works of Fedir Medvedev, Oleksandr Finkel (Note: Russian: Александр Моисеевич Финкель), Petro Verbitsky, Lidiya Lysychenko, Olena Oleksenko (Note: Ukrainian: Олексенко Олена Андріївна), Petro Redin and others.

=== Revival ===
The School was revived in 1991 after the collapse of the USSR by Anatoly Ivchenko, Andrii Danylenko, Leonid Ushkalov and Serhiy Vakulenko and is based in the Kharkiv Pedagogical University.
