= Josif Majzner =

Serbian-Canadian artist

Josif Majzner also known as José Majzner (Serbian Cyrillic: Јосиф Мајзнер; Belgrade, Kingdom of Serbia, 1916 - Montreal, Québec, Canada) was a Serbian Canadian émigré sculptor and painter.

== Biography ==
Josif Majzner's ancestors came from Sudetenland, now the Czech Republic, to Serbia at the end of the 18th or the early 19th century. His father was Stojan Novaković's collaborator and deputy librarian at the National Library of Serbia in Belgrade. He attended the best art academies in the 1930s in Europe. Just before the outbreak of Second World War, he joined the Yugoslav National Movement and during the war he bequeathed his father's archives to the National Library of Serbia. At the war's end, he resolved not to stay in a usurped country with the arrival of communism, went to Italy where he gave art lessons to artists who became well-known in their right (Alexandra Marko, Alexander Dzigurski). In 1947, he left Rome for Buenos Aires in Argentina. In the late 1950s, he moved to New York City, where he worked for a museum restoring old paintings. In the early 1960s, he left New York and came to Montreal where he opened an atelier on Clark Street where students gathered evenings in cafés. Art students from École des beaux-arts de Montréal would seek art lessons from him. He was always ready to share his knowledge with young people. A few of his Montreal students became renowned painters like Armand Tatossian, his older sister Rose Tatossian, and Dubravko Raos among many others. In 1999, his atelier caught fire, and he died of smoke inhalation.

== Works ==
- Bust
- Icons on the iconostasis of the Montreal "Holy Trinity" Serbian Orthodox Church on Melville Avenue in Westmount.
- A bust of Montreal surgeon Drago Papich in front of the entrance of the "Holy Trinity" church in Westmount is Majzner's work.
- Muški akt
- Winter Scene (1964)
- House and River (1964)
- Vase with Three Roses

== Sources ==
- Zoran D. Nenezić: Masoni u Jugoslaviji (1764-1980): pregled istorije slobodnog zidara u Jugoslaviji: prilozi i građa, 1984, pages 196 & 1999 cites Josif Majzner as deputy librarian of the National Library of Serbia in Belgrade.
- Value Statement: Holy Trinity Serbian Orthodox Church in Montreal cites José Majzner as the painter of the icons on the iconostasis in the Montreal church.
- "New local galleries emphasize young artists" by Virginia Nixon and Sarah McCutcheon. The Gazette, Montreal, Saturday, June 5, 1971, page 49
