= Pension Fund Building =

Coordinates: 44.8123°N 20.4618°E

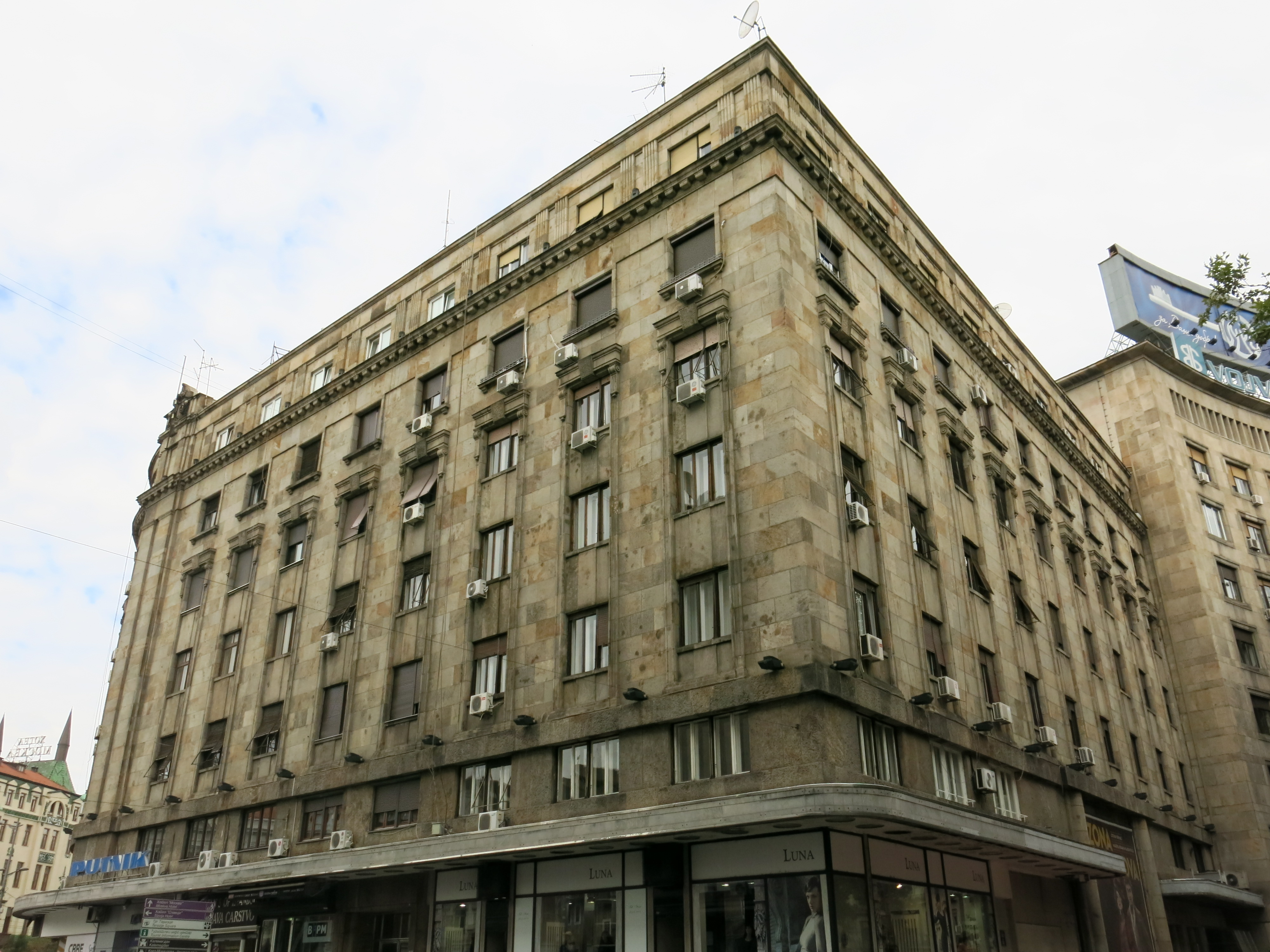

The building of the Pension Fund of the clerks and servants of the National Bank of Yugoslavia, today the building of the popular „Theatre-on-Terazije“, was built in 1939, after the design of the Russian architect Grigorije Samojlov. With one residential and several official entrances, the building opens out to two Belgrade squares – 29 Terazije Square and 3 Nikole Pašića Square.

== History ==
The building was built in 1939 on the site of the former Uroš's Alehouse and Šiško's Tavern From the time of construction, the citizens of Belgrade called the building the Belgrade palace, after the name of the basement and the ground floor cinema, which is now occupied by the "Theatre-on-Terazije". It was built after the design of the Russian architect Grigorije Samojlov, who studied and graduated in Belgrade, at the Department of Architecture of the Technical Faculty, in 1930. In the years that intervened between his graduation and the construction of the Pension Fund Building, he designed several residential buildings in Belgrade and in Serbia, as well as the church of the St. Gabriel the Archangel in Topčidersko Brdo.

== Architecture ==
At the time of the Pension Fund building's construction, academism, although still a steady constant in the architecture of the capital, gave way to the purified modernism. The Art Deco had already been established in Belgrade, under the influence of the western centres. The postulates of those styles are recognizable in the construction of the building. The Terazije-facing elevation displays a hierarchy typical for academism. It is perforated by the calm rhythm of windows. Double shallow pilasters with the simple base and capitals rise through the first four floors. In the highest zone there are two cartouches which accentuate the corner part. The ground floor with transparent shop windows is set back from the upper levels providing the deep, brightly-lit overhang. On the facade facing the Nikola Pašić Square there is a square filed intended for displaying former cinema repertoire, and nowadays for the theatre repertoire. Stone-clad facades are modernized, with no heavy decorative plastic. The most original element is the main entrance to the cinema in art deco style. The entrance hall in the form of a high-ceiling vestibule, with the mosaic floor, playbill display cases and ornamented portal represents the unique creation in Belgrade. The entrance is decorated with the bronze and wrought-iron grille gate, with the medallion in the middle, depicting a nude dancing couple. The author of the bronze sculpture of the dancing couple was the Russian artist Vladimir Zagorodnjuk.

== Interior ==
The focal point of the ground-floor is the hall with a curved staircase leading down to the cinema/theatre. Its dome ceiling is decorated with a relief composition in stucco, “Dancing in the Water”. The semi-circular basement foyer has a ceiling supported by five pairs of columns arranged in a semicircle. The upper zone of its walls is decorated with a frieze in relief, “Repose”, depicting five life-size figures in different recumbent postures and, between them, sea world motifs such as fish and water flowers. The frieze is reflected in the band of the mirror above the entrance to the auditorium, the two thus forming a full circle. The relief was done by the sculptor Risto Stijović after Samojlov's drawings.

== Cinema and the theatre ==
„Belgrade“ Cinema was opened on 24 October 1940. Both the auditorium and the entrance passageway from Terazije were furnished with modern equipment. Next to the box office there was a signal board, that is, a seating plan of the porter and the balcony with lamps on every seat. These lamps indicated vacant seats and helped audience to orient. The auditorium, had a capacity of more than one thousand seats, comfortable leather chairs on the model of the Berlin Opera. For the first time in Belgrade, the problem of air heating, cooling, regulation of humidity and ventilation was solved by using an American air-conditioning system. The acoustic design of the auditorium was based on its funnel-like shape and the use of special materials for the walls. After the German occupation of Serbia in 1941, the cinema became the “Soldaten-kino”, and after the war, in 1949 the Humoristic Theatre moved in, and used the building together with the cinema “Belgrade”. The Humoristic Theatre underwent certain transformations before it became the “Theatre-on-Terazije”.

== Urbanism ==
At the time of the construction of the "Belgrade“ building, the County Court building, was situated across the street, on the site of present Nikole Pašića Square. The County Court building was destroyed in bombing during the Second World War. With the construction of the Marx and Engels Square and the Trade Unions building in 1955, the rear elevation gave importance. It functions as the left-hand side wing of the Trade Unions building, thus participating in the formation of the Square.

== Cultural monument ==
The Pension Fund building in Terazije, a successful combination of different architectural trends that flourished at the time, may be considered the most important single design of Grigorije Samojlov and one of the most important works in Belgrade's architecture in the years before the Second World War. In the sense of the design it represents the successful mixture of various stylistic tendencies characteristic for the period of its construction. As the building of specific architectural, urbanistic, cultural and historical values, the building was declared a cultural monument (The Decision, "The Official Gazette of RS“, no. 30/07).
