= Harambašić =

Harambašić is a Croatian, Bosnian and Serbian surname, derived from harambaša – bandit leader, which may refer to:

- August Harambašić (1861−1911), Croatian writer, poet, publisher, politician and translator
- Stevan Harambašić, military commander in the Republic of Serbian Krajina

== See also ==
- Arambašić, other surname with the same meaning
- Harambašići, settlement in Bosnia and Herzegovina
- Haramija
- Korun Aramija
