= Cvijeta Zuzorić Art Pavilion =

Coordinates: 44.8225°N 20.4540°E

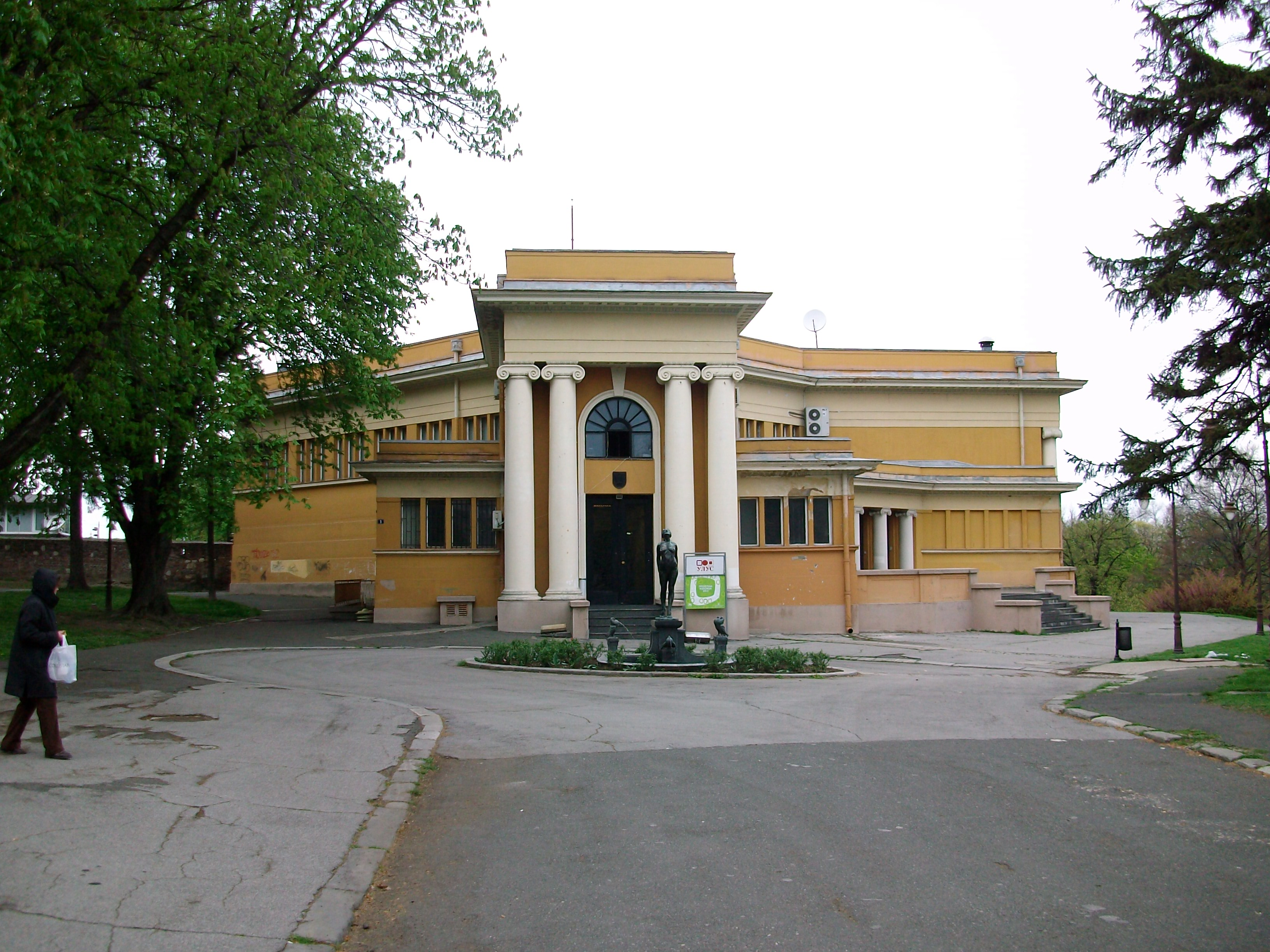
- Interactive map of the Cvijeta Zuzorić Art Pavilion area

General information
- Status: Cultural Heritage
- Type: art pavilion
- Location: Belgrade, Serbia
- Construction started: 6 November 1927
- Opening: 23 December 1928

Design and construction
- Architect: Branislav Kojić

Website
- beogradskonasledje.rs

„Cvijeta Zuzorić“ Art Pavilion (Serbian: Уметнички павиљон "Цвијета Зузорић", Umetnički paviljon "Cvijeta Zuzorić") is an exhibition building in Belgrade, in Kalemegdan, situated in the park's section of Little Kalemegdan, next to the south-eastern front of the Belgrade fortress. It was built between 1927 and 1928 after the design of the architect Branislav Kojić, in the Art Deco architectural style. It was the first venue built specifically as an exhibition space, or an art gallery, in Serbia.

== History ==
=== Origin ===
Area at the top of the Little Kalemegdan, which is occupied by the pavilion today, was an open fairground for a long time. Tents were placed, with numerous attractions: panoptikum or collections of curios, okular ("funny" ocular lenses), magicians, fortune tellers, illusionists, etc. Ilija Božić performed here the very first Serbian puppet show, Kuku, Todore. In the mid-1920s the fair was displaced to Voždovac, an eastern suburb at the time, due to the impending construction of the art pavilion. As the new location was too distant for most of the Belgraders, the fair was soon disbanded.

Branislav Nušić, a playwright and at that time the head of Art Division of the Ministry of Education, invited some of the most prominent Belgrade ladies in February 1922 to a meeting in the ministry. Joined by the composer Miloje Milojević, painter Branko Popović and writer Todor Manojlović, he threw in the conversation an idea of forming an artistic female society and construction of an art pavilion. The association of Friends of Art "Cvijeta Zuzorić" was soon founded whose name preserved the memory of Dubrovnik female poet and art admirer from the 16th century. The association suggested construction of the pavilion in Belgrade, exclusively for the exhibition of works of art. Till that time, these were exhibited in Gymnasium halls and gala hall of Captain Miša's Mansion, since the space specially intended for this kind of concept and content did not exist. With the aim of collecting donations for the construction of the art pavilion, in February 1923, the ball called “Thousand and Second Night” was organized in the Hotel "Kasina" by Nušić. The rich individuals, such as Đorđe Vajfert, Luka Ćelović, Mihajlo Pupin and king Alexander I of Yugoslavia, gave their donation, as well as the National Bank, Adriatic-Danubian Bank, and Wiener Bankverein. The association continued with the organization of charity balls, tea parties and lotteries. The events continued to have fairytale themes like “Midwinter's night dream”, “Golden age”, “Wedding in Skadarlija, etc.

Two years later, at the end of 1925, the Art Division of the Ministry of Education announced the competition for the construction of the new exhibition space. The pavilion should have been erected the immediate vicinity of Princess Ljubica's Residence. The architect Branislav Kojić won the first prize at the competition, the second one won the architect Milan Zloković and the third won the architect Мihailo Radovanović. After the competition, the Belgrade Municipality decides to concede the building plot to the association, yet not in the site next to the Konak, but in Little Kalemegdan. Due to this change, Branislav Kojić had to change the awarded design in order to harmonize it with the new circumstances, since his design was related to the Konak. Something completely different, contemporary and modern, was expected from Kojić.

=== Construction ===
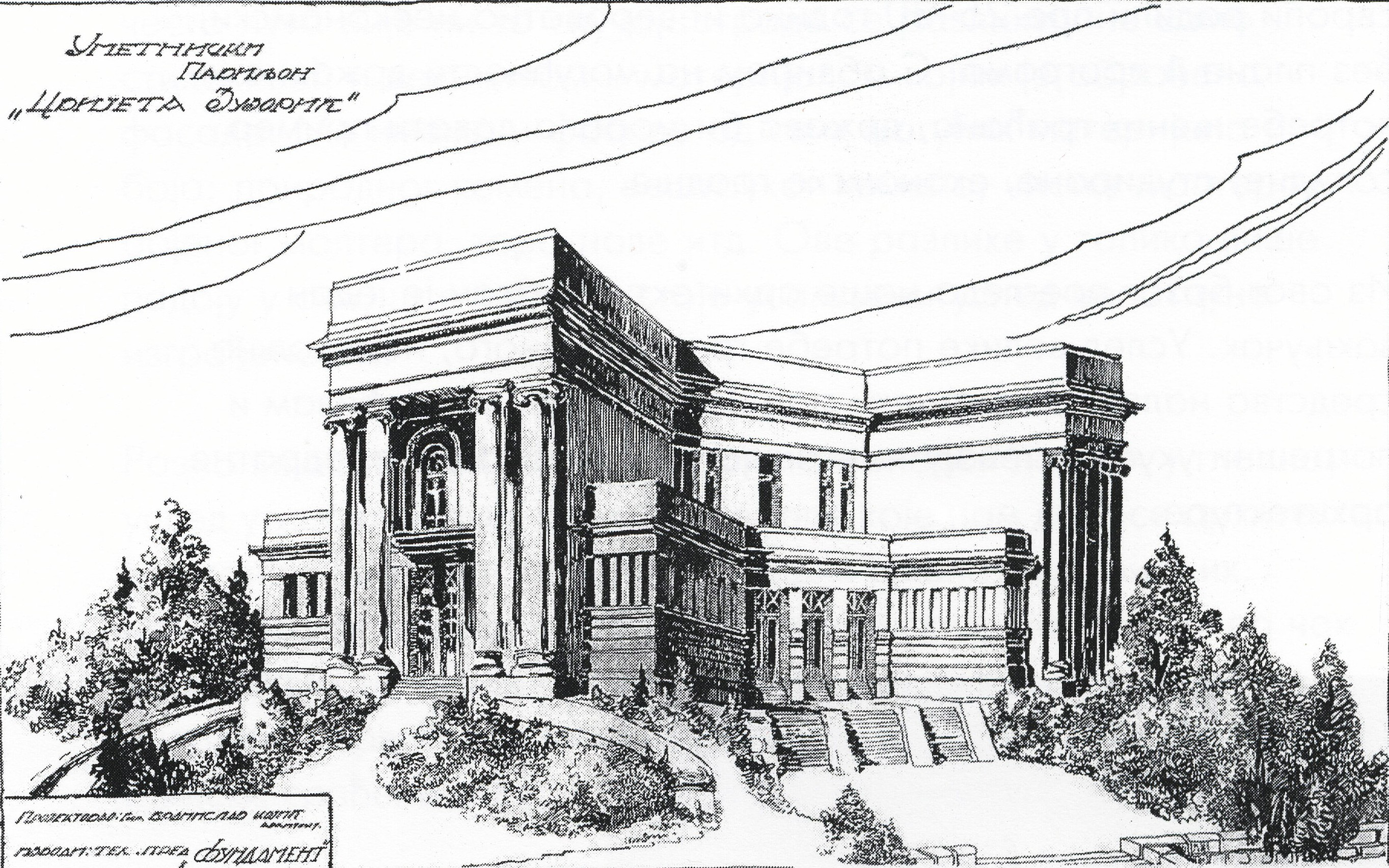
Drawing of the Pavilion by architect Branislav Kojić

The foundation stone was laid on 6 November 1927. A charter written in the Church Slavonic language, with signatures of the members of the association (all female), was built into the foundations. The charter was placed in the bottle filled with oil which was then placed in a tin box. The foundations were consecrated by the Bishop of Timok, Emilijan Piperković. Representative of the Ministry was poet Veljko Petrović.

=== Pavilion ===
The pavilion was opened on 23 December 1928 in the presence of Prince Pavle and his wife Olga, Patriarch Dimitrije and the representatives of the Academy, government, Belgrade Municipality, University etc. Sculptor Sreten Stojanović addressed the guests, thanking everyone for their donations. The first "Autumn Exhibition" of Belgrade painters and sculptors was opened on 30 December 1928. Proper exhibition season began in 1929. Every exhibition was starting at Sundays, at 11:00. On average, there were 18 exhibitions per year.

Some of the most important names of Belgrade artistic scene appeared at the exhibition, such as Beta Vukanović, Milena Pavlović-Barili, Vasa Pomorišac, Uroš Predić, Petar Palavičini, Тоma Rosandić and others. Among the first manifestations held in the pavilion was the Salon of Architecture, the exhibition prepared by newly founded Group of Architect of Modern Movement. At the time of erection, the artistic pavilion was the only cultural edifice built purposely as an exhibition space, and had such a huge impact on the cultural life of Belgrade, that it was identified with the artistic life and artistic events of that time. It also played an important role on spreading the artistic culture and maintaining the artistic life in Serbia during the Interbellum. At one point, the general rule in the artistic circled was that a painter doesn't deserve any attention, unless some of his works have been exhibited in the pavilion, at least as a part of a group exhibition. Nowadays, the building is the site of the Association of the Fine artists of Serbia.

A combined artistic-documentary exhibition "Historical moments from the life of the Art Pavilion Cvijeta Zuzorić 1928-1945", from December 2018 to January 2019, marked the 90th anniversary of the gallery.

Six Chinese windmill palm trees were planted in the green area in front of the pavilion on 23 September 2020. They were the first palms planted in Belgrade's public green area. Authorities said the palms will survive the weather as the Belgrade's climate is getting warmer due to the climate change.

=== Reconstruction ===
After the design of the architect Gradimir Medaković, in 1975 a major reconstruction of the interior was undertaken, a new gallery was built, and the old glass roof was removed.

== Architecture ==
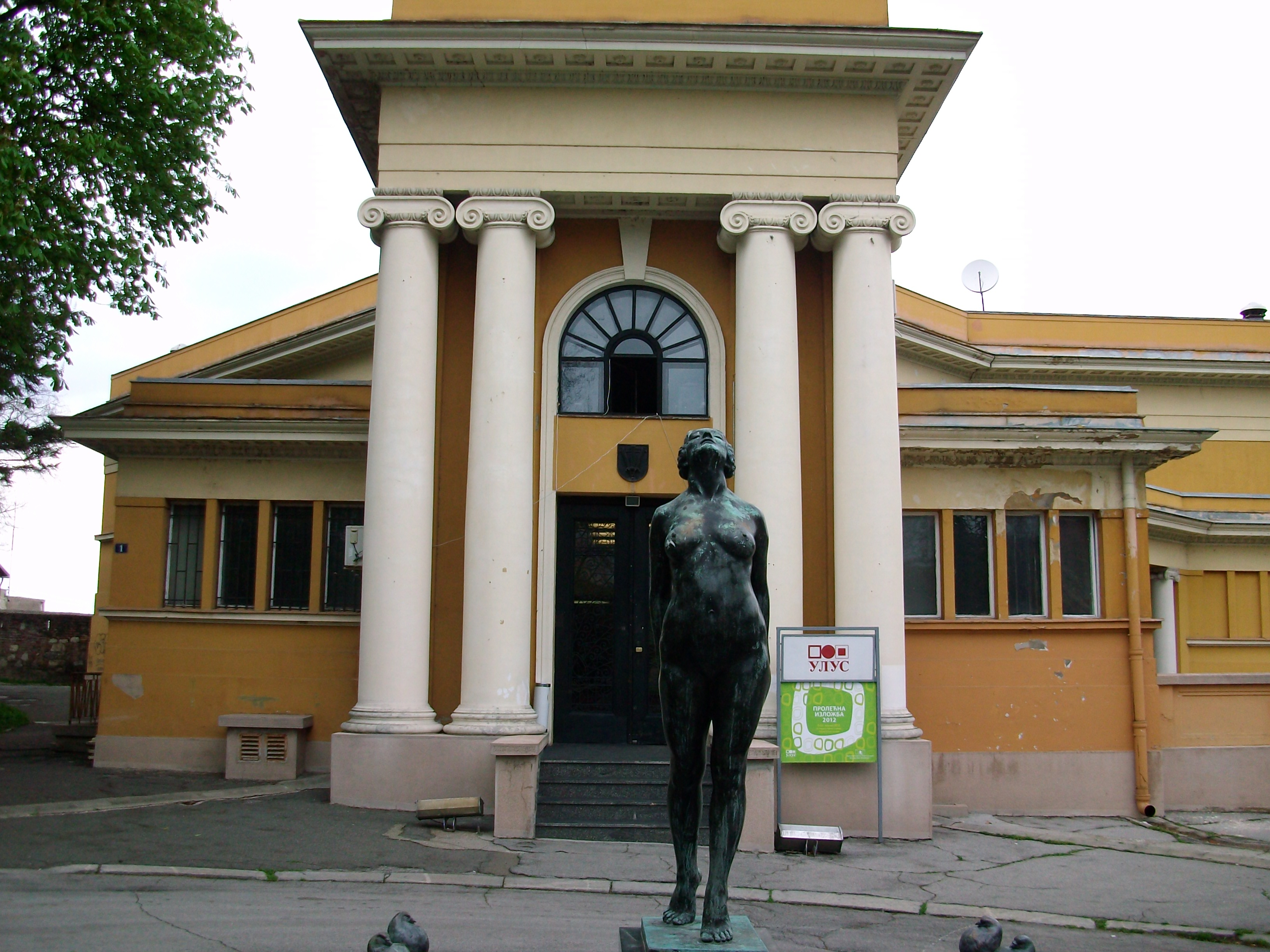
Sculpture by Dragomir Arambašić

At the time of the construction of the object, art deco style was very topical in the European architecture, as an echo of the Paris exhibition held in 1925, called Exposition Internationale des Arts Décoratifs et Industriels Modernes. Branislav Kojić visited the exhibition, along with the other members of the Architects Club. The great impression that the exhibition had on him, can easily be noticed in the architecture of the pavilion. The building is indented in volume, with flat surfaces on the facades, without rich ornamentation. The cornices were emphasized, but the windows are not accentuated. Ionian columns at the expected place at the entrance are kind of unusual. The elements of the classic architecture were incorporated in a completely new architectural concept. All of that indicates that the author found inspiration in popular art deco architecture. In 1936, the fountain was built in front of the pavilion. Named the "Awakening" and sculptured by Dragomir Arambašić, it is in the form of the naked female figure, standing on the pedestal between the pigeons, with water streams pouring from their beaks. Until the big reconstruction of the Pavilion in the 1930s, above the main door there was the allegoric representation of the art, done in the stained glass technique, the work of the painter Vasa Pomorišac.

== Protection ==
The building was declared a cultural monument in 1973. (The Decision of the Cultural Heritage Protection Institute of the City of Belgrade no. 68/3, from 22 February 1973)

== See also ==
- Cvijeta Zuzorić
