= Korun =

Origin
- Region of origin: Balkans

Other names
- Variant forms: Koruna (feminine variant), Korunović, Korić, Korać

Korun is masculine name or surname. According to some sources it has its origin in Turkish language. According to some other sources this masculine name is based on feminine name Korona. Alternative variant forms of names and surnames based on this name include Koruna, Korunović, Korać (in cases when it is not based on the farrier's hammer) and Korić.

== See also ==
- Korun Aramija
- Korun Koča Anđelković
- Theodor Corona Musachi
