= Jovan Tomić =

Serbian historian (1869–1932)

- Born: 9 May 1869; Nova Varoš, Ottoman Empire
- Died: 22 July 1932 (aged 63); Belgrade, Yugoslavia
- Education: Velika škola
- Occupations: historian, academic
- Known for: director, National Library of Serbia (1903–1927)

Jovan Tomić (9 May 1869 in Nova Varoš – 22 July 1932 in Belgrade) was a Serbian historian, academic and the former director of the National Library of Serbia from 1903 to 1927.

== Biography ==
Tomić was born in Nova Varoš in the Zlatibor District, which was at the time part of the Ottoman Empire. He attended high school in Kragujevac and determined early that his destiny was in historical research, education and record-keeping. He attended the Velika škola in Belgrade, from which he earned a bachelor's degree in 1890. Upon completion of his studies, he taught in Kruševac and Kragujevac, between 1890 and 1894. From 1894 and 1896 he lived in France and Italy where he pursued further studies in library science and professional training as an educator. His experiences abroad were put to good use when he was a professor at the teachers' training college in Aleksinac and the First Belgrade Gymnasium.

From 1903 to 1927 he was the director of the National Library of Serbia. During his time as director the First World War brought a lot of misfortune to the library. The bombing destroyed a part of its holdings, and the remaining collections were moved for safety to several different places in Belgrade, Niš and Kosovska Mitrovica. A part of the collections ended up in Sofia (Bulgaria), but was returned after the war. A lot of the library materials, manuscripts, books and newspapers disappeared. Thanks to Jovan Tomić's public activity, the reconstruction of the library holdings began during the war and was intensified after the war.

== Selected works ==
Tomić has published 60 books, and more than 40 learned articles and dissertations, a lot of criticism, reports and polemics. He also worked on the publication of archive material.

- O Arnautima u Staroj Srbiji i u sandžaku Novog Pazara (The Albanians in Old Serbia and in the Sandjak of Novi Pazar), Belgrade, 1913;
- Pećki Patrijarh Jovan i pokret hrišćana na Balkansokom poluostrvu, 1592-1614 (Patriarch Jovan of Peć and the Christian Movement in the Balkan Peninsula, 1592-1614), Zemun, 1913;
- Crna Gora za Morejskog rata, 1684-1699 (Montenegro and the Morean War, 1684-1699), Belgrade, 1907;
- Pitanje Careva Laza (The Question of Carev Laz), Belgrade, 1933;
- Građa za istoriju Gornje Albanije (Records on the History of High Albania), Belgrade, 1905;
- Rat na Kosovu i Staroj Srbiji 1912. godine (War in Kosovo and Old Serbia in 1912), Novi Sad, 1913;
- Cetinje i Crna Gora(Cetinje and Montenegro), Belgrade 1927.

In his work 'Who is Djemo the Mountaineer' (Serbian: Ко је Ђемо Брђанин) Tomić claims that Djemo the Mountaineer was from region of Brda which is a territory modern-day Montenegro and Northern Albania. He thought that Musa Kesedžija is based on the supporter of Jegen Osman Pasha while Jegen Pasha himself has been transformed into Djemo the Mountaineer (Serbian: Ђемо Брђанин) in Serbian epic poetry.

Cultural offices
Preceded by Ljubomir Jovanović	Director of National Library of Serbia; 1903–1927	Succeeded by Miloš Zečević
