= Musa Kesedžija =

Legendary villain

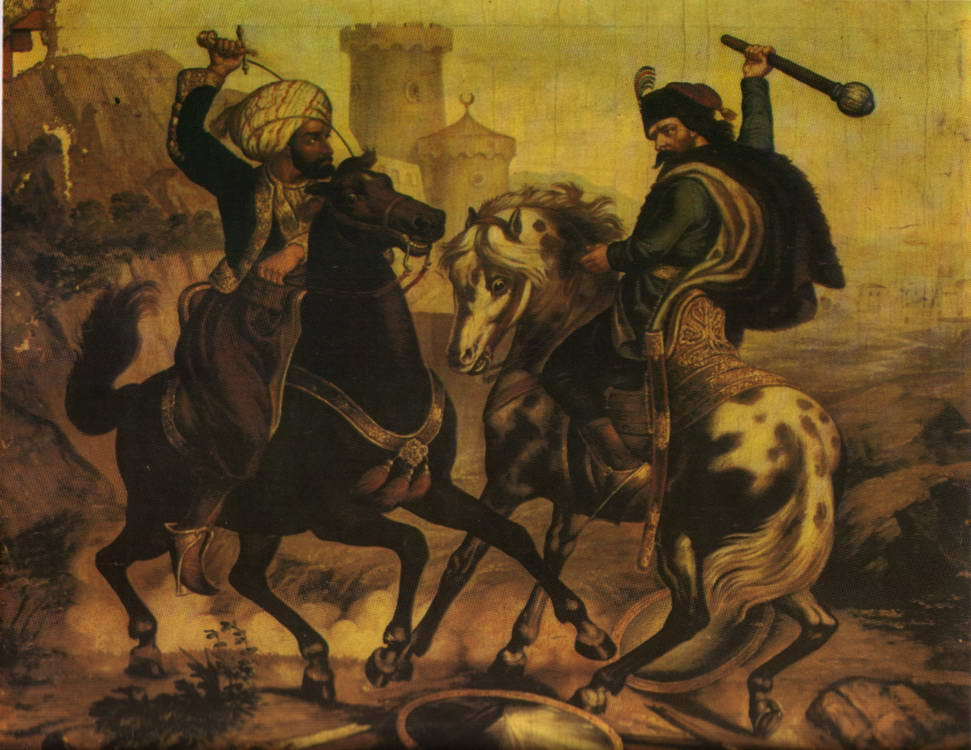
Prince Marko and Musa Kesedžija, painting by Vladislav Titelbah (1900). Musa Kesedžija is on the left.

Musa Kesedžija, Musa Arbanas (Serbian and Macedonian: Муса Кесеџија, Bulgarian: Муса Кеседжия), also described as Musa the Robber, Musa the Outlaw, Musa the Highwayman or Musa the Beheader, is a popular legendary villain of Serbian epic poetry and Bulgarian and Macedonian folklore. He is most famous as a rival of Prince Marko (Serbian: Марко Краљевић), a hero of Serbian and South Slavic folklore.

In the poem Musa is an Albanian highwayman who confronts Prince Marko, a vassal of the Sultan, at the Kačanik Gorge, today in modern Kosovo.

== Musa Kesedžija in literature and arts ==
=== Marko Kraljević and Musa Kesedžija ===
Musa Kesedžija first appeared in the poem Marko Kraljević and Musa Kesedžija, which was recorded for the first time in Sremski Karlovci and published in 1815 by Vuk Karadžić. Karadžić recorded the poem sung by Tešan Podrugović.

Musa had three hearts which is a sign of exceptional heroism in Serbian epic poetry. Because of his three hearts, Musa can be seen as an anthropomorphised descendant of chthonic monsters, as their anthropomorphosis can be reflected in the multiplication of body parts.

=== Other literature works ===
Petar I Petrović-Njegoš (1747–1830) mentions Musa and Marko Kraljević in his song The Sons of Ivan-bey (Serbian Cyrillic: Синови Иванбегови), which was after his death published first in 1835 and then by Petar II Petrović-Njegoš in his 1845 song collection Serbian Mirror (Serbian Cyrillic: Огледало Србско).

Musa appears in Macedonian folklore as a symbol of the oppressive Ottoman government.

The song about Marko Kraljević and Musa Kesedžija also exists in Bulgarian literature as an epic retelling (Bulgarian: Крали Марко се надбягва с Муса Кеседжия и го побеждава).

In 1972 Werner Cohn published a gypsy story about Marko Kraljević and Musa Kesedžija, which is also in the form of a retelling of another epic song — Marko Kraljević and Djemo the Monuntaineer.

In Zakarpattia the epic poetry about Marko Kraljević and Musa Kesedžija has been modified into stories connected with the Kosovo battle.

== Historical background ==
=== Historical persons ===
The epic villain Musa Kesedžija is based on actual historical people.

According to some authors he is the result of merging several historical people including Musa Çelebi son of Bayezid I and Theodor III Muzaka from the Muzaka Albanian noble family, with whom Marko had dispute over Kostur.

Jovan Tomić thinks that Musa Kesedžija is based on another historical person, the supporter of Jegen Osman Pasha who has been transformed into another epic hero — Djemo the Mountaineer (Serbian: Ђемо Брђанин) in Serbian epic poetry. The epic poetry describes Djemo as Kesedžija's brother.

=== Historical events ===
Actual historical events do not support a plot in which Prince Marko (who died in 1395) killed Musa Çelebi (died in 1413) or Moisi Arianit Golemi (died in 1465). John Van Antwerp Fine Jr. emphasized that Sandalj Hranić should have been the epic hero who fought and killed Kesedžija rather than Marko Kraljević, because it was Hranić who significantly contributed to the death of Musa Çelebi.

"Prince Marko and Musa Kesedžija"
Serbian: "Марко Краљевић и Муса Кесеџија"
The concluding portion of the poem, sung to the accompaniment of the gusle (verses 220–81).
(Duration: 5 minutes, 12 seconds)

== See also ==
- Korun Kesedžija

== Sources ==
- Popović, Tanya (1988). Prince Marko: the hero of South Slavic epics. Syracuse, N.Y.: Syracuse University Press. ISBN 978-0-8156-2444-8.
