= Vladislav Titelbah =

Vladislav Titelbah (Czech: Vladislav Titelbah; Serbian Cyrillic: Владислав Тителбах; 1847–1925) was a Czech-born Serbian painter. In his aquarelles and drawings, he depicted rural interiors, persons, and scenes. He also copied Serbian folk embroidery and other products of folk art from Serbia. He made around 1,000 works.

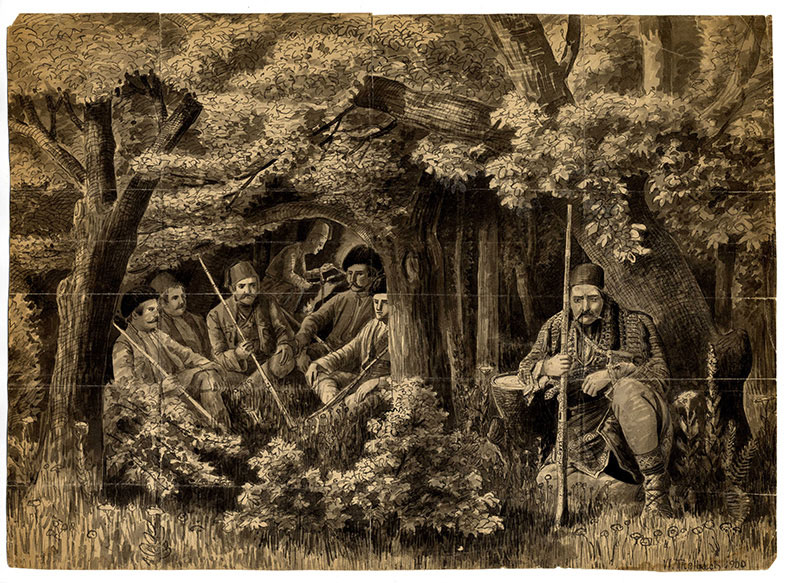
Hajduks, 1900

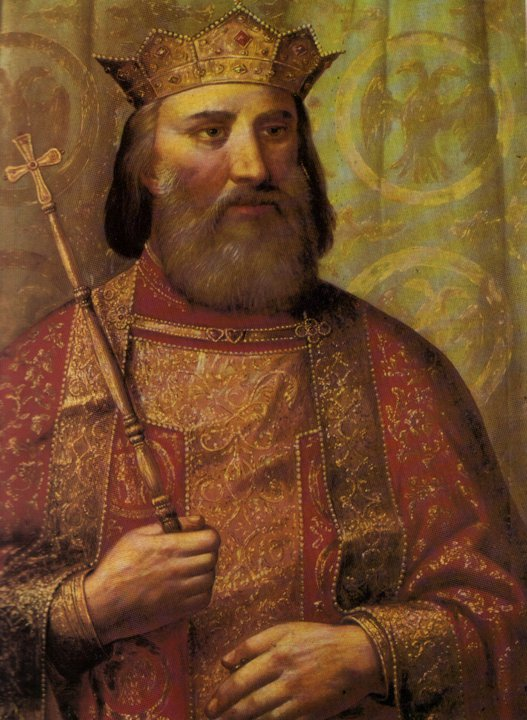
Knez Lazar, ca. 1900

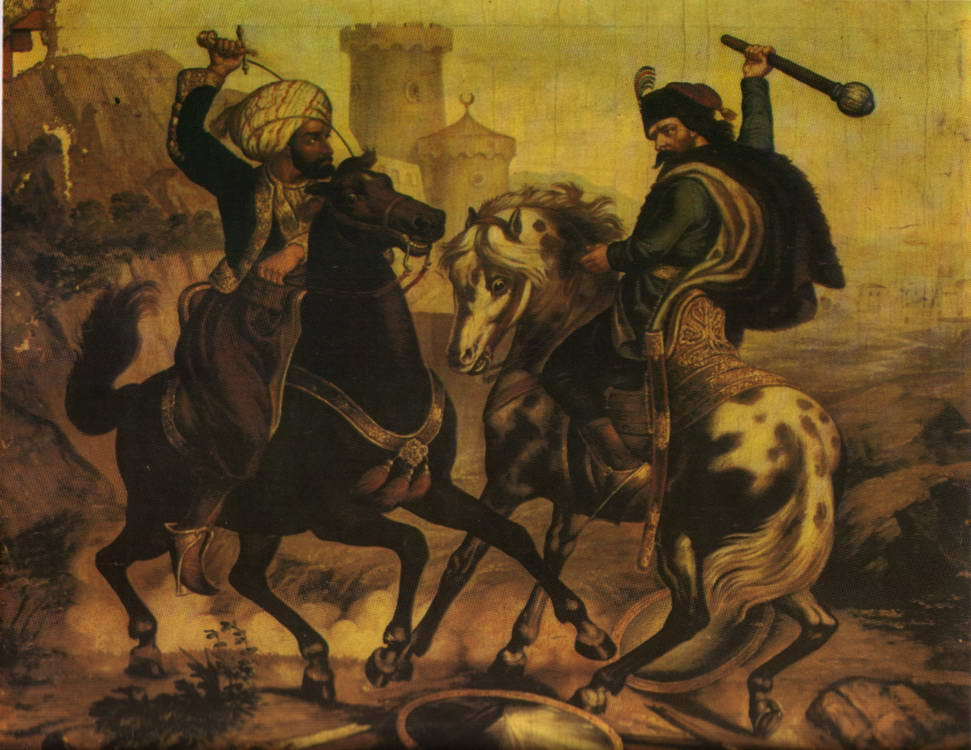
Marko Kraljević and Musa Kesedžija, ca. 1900

== Sources ==
- "Тителбах Владислав". Мала енциклопедија Просвета (in Serbian). Vol. 3 (3 ed.). Belgrade: Prosveta Publishing House. 1978. p. 392.
- A. P. (18 February 2015). "Srbija u srcu Čeha". Novosti.
