= Korun Aramija =

Korun Aramija or Korun Haramija or Korun Kesedžija is a popular legendary hero of Serbian epic poetry and Bulgarian and Macedonian folklore. He is known as a rival of either Prince Marko or Nenad Jugović, other heroes of South Slavic folklore. The epic hero Korun Aramija is based on actual historical person, Theodor Corona Musachi from Muzaka family that was in conflict with Prince Marko over the town of Kastoria.

== Historical background ==
The Muzaka family was in conflict with Prince Marko before his death in 1396 which is probably why Theodor Corona Musachi is commemorated in Serbian and south Slavic epic poetry as Korun, Marko's enemy. The term Aramija is derived from Turkish word for bandit (Turkish: haram).

== Epic poems ==
Songs about Korun and Nenad Jugović (three different versions) were collected by Vuk Karadžić and published posthumously in 1899 in chapter titled "The earliest songs about heroes" (Serbian: Најстарије пјесме јуначке). Narratives involving Korun as an adversary of Nenad explore the popular theme of blood vengeance in the Balkans. The story usually opens with Korun massacring whole of Nenad's family, or all of his siblings and almost mortally wounding his parents, out of his sheer vanity over some dubiously grave insult he experienced at the hands of Nenad's loved ones. Nenad survives the massacre for being placed in a convent as a youngest of the children and comes out to seek his revenge on a perpetrator.

In epic poetry from Macedonia Korun Aramija is also described as attacking nuptial, making love to widows etc. and always being killed at the end by Sekula, Kostadin or Popović Ivan. Song about fight between Prince Marko and Korun Aramija (Marko and the Highland Fighter Korun) was first recorded by Ivan Stepanovič Jastrebov in Macedonian region of Debar. This song has similar motif as song about Prince Marko and Musa Kesedžija because Marko was again fighting against better hero who also is depicted as having more than one heart.

In a song recorded in the region of Prilep, Korun is referred to as hajduk who can not die because of many sins he committed.

Some of the poems about Korun are:

- Nenad Jugović i Koruna vojvoda
- Nejaki Nenad i vojvoda Korun
- Kraljević Marko i Korun razbojnik
- Kraljević Marko i Korun aramlija
- Popović Jovan i Korun razbojnik
- Nikolić Nenad i Korun kapetan
- Sekula detenca i Korun Aramija
- Se razbole Korun aramija
- More Korun Aramijo
- Korun Aramija što greovi imal
- Ballad of Michael the Dragon and Korun the Kessedija, from the Sofia Province

== See also ==
- Korun
- Haramija
- Harambašić
- Korun Koča Anđelković
