= Haramija =

Origin
- Language: Turkish, Arabic, Croatian
- Origin: Arabic: haram + Armin
- Meaning: pirate, skilled and extremely ruthless warrior

Other names
- Variant forms: Haraminić, Haraminčić, Haramina, Haramin, Harambašić, Aramija, Harami, Arami, Hermes, Herman

Haramija is a Croatian family name. Arabic (haram - forbidden, taboo ; Armin - warrior). Haramija was corp of Christian army in the period from 16th till 18th century in Croatia (it was part of Habsburg Monarchy). They were founded in 1539 in Zagreb (today the capital of Croatia) for the purpose of defense against the expansion of the Ottoman Empire into Croatia and further into Central and Western Europe. They were highly respected for their profession, and only very tall men with strong physical strength could be accepted into the service. The key role they had was to protect the southern parts of the Austrian Empire from robbers who would suddenly invade from the territory of the Turkish Empire, destroy settlements and take people into slavery.

Dragutin Haramija (1923–2012) was Prime Minister of Croatia in 1969–71.

== See also ==
- Harambašić
- Korun Aramija
