= Yeğen Osman Pasha =

Yeğen Osman Agha or Pasha
- Died: 1689
- Military career
- Allegiance: Ottoman Empire
- Commands: ? – 1687: commander of Anatolian sekbans; 1687: sanjakbey and serçeşme of the Sanjak of Karahisar-i Sahib; 1687: beylerbey of Rumelia; 1688: governor of Belgrade
- Conflicts: Siege of Belgrade (1688)

Yeğen Osman Pasha or Yeğen Osman Aga was 17th-century Ottoman military officer of Armenian origin. After being commander of sekban (peasant mercenaries) units in Anatolia, he was appointed first to position of sanjakbey and serçeşme of the Sanjak of Karahisar-i Sahib. In 1687, for a couple of months, he was also the beylerbey of Rumelia Eyalet, which was the highest position he ever held.

== Career ==
=== Reign of Mehmed IV ===
Yeğen Osman was commander of all Anatolian sekbans. Rivalries between the janissaries and the sekbans ultimately resulted in a rebellion. After the janissaries had been defeated on the Rumelian front, they marched on Istanbul in 1687 to depose Mehmed IV. The latter took action to marry his daughter to Yeğen Osman and appointed him to hold the janissaries in check. In 1687, Yeğen Osman was appointed as sanjakbey of the Sanjak of Karahisar-i Sahib in exchange for providing support to the sultan with 5,000 of his men. At his insistence, he was also appointed as security chief (serçeşme) of this province. Instead of bringing his forces to the front, by the middle of May 1687, he brought around 4,000 men to Istanbul and, rather than defeat the forces that threatened the sultan, they actually only further threatened him. Only 1,500 of his men were sent to the front at the end of June. To satisfy appetites of the ambitious Yeğen Osman and win his support, the Sultan made him beylerbey of Rumelia Eyalet with his seat in Sofia and gave him responsibility for the exceptionally important front against the Holy League. Yeğen Osman de facto remained on the position until 1689, and treated the territories he controlled as his personal fiefdom. He increased taxes to unbearable level to earn as much money as possible for himself, though he regularly denied this when he was faced with criticism.

=== Reign of Suleiman II ===
==== Rebellion ====
Mehmed IV was succeeded by Suleiman II who continued the policy of his predecessor towards the sekbans. Yeğen Osman, as Rumelian beylerbey, rebelled against the new sultan and became the main enemy of the Ottoman government. All dissatisfied sekbans gathered around him, including many from Anatolia. The Sultan offered him the position of serasker of Timișoara, but he refused. The Sultan appointed him as sanjakbey of the Sanjak of Bosnia and Yeğen's uncle as sanjakbey of the Sanjak of Herzegovina, but this did not satisfy his ambitions, so his forces of 10,000 men continued to plunder the territories under his control, including the Ottoman Serbia and Greece. According to some sources, Yeğen Osman had more money than Ottoman treasury.

In 1688 his forces, notorious for robbing the population, robbed the treasury of Serbian Patriarchate of Peć hidden in Gračanica monastery. According to one letter written by Catholic bishop Peter Bogdani, Yeğen Osman Pasha threatened to cut off the head of Archbishop of Peć and Serbian Patriarch Arsenije III Crnojević because he received money from the Austrians to instigate an anti-Ottoman rebellion among the Orthodox Serbs.

To bring Yeğen Osman to heels the new Sultan appointed Yeğen Osman to the position of governor of Belgrade in 1688. This appointment angered Yeğen Osman, because this position was subordinated to Ottoman serdar of Hungary, Hasan Pasha. He insisted that his new position would not make him subordinated to Ottoman serdar of Hungary, nor the Porte itself. The struggle over the position of serdar of Hungary caused deep hatred between Hasan Pasha and Yeğen Osman. When Yeğen Osman went to Belgrade with his forces he forcefully deposed Hasan Pasha by capturing his camp on the Vračar hill and putting him into prison.

==== Siege of Belgrade 1688 ====
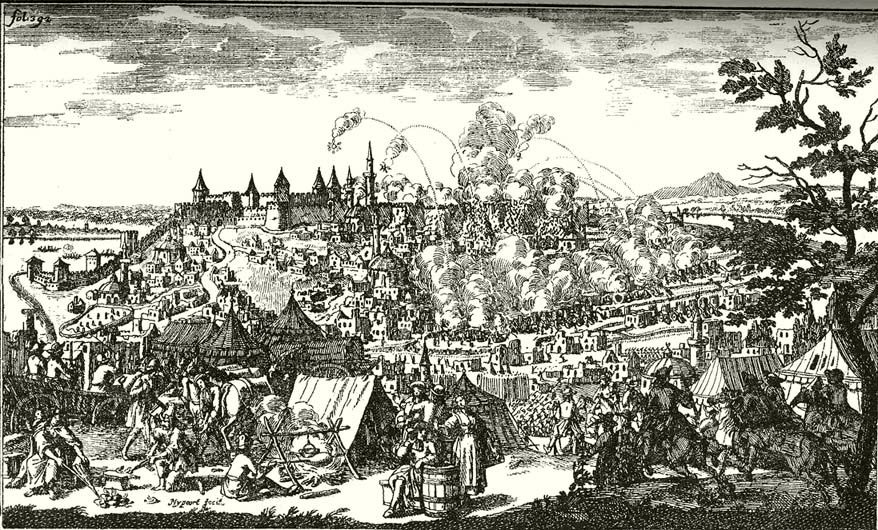
Siege of Belgrade in 1688

When the forces of the Holy Roman Empire besieged Belgrade in 1688, the Emperor sent a letter to Yeğen Osman and offered him Wallachia to desert from the Ottomans and switch to his side. Since Yeğen Osman requested all of Slavonia and Bosnia, they did not make an agreement. The Austrians positioned ponton bridges near Ostružnica and crossed Sava with 10,000 forces. Yeğen Osman attacked them with bulk of his forces, but the Austrians repelled his two attacks, captured more land on the right bank of the Sava and brought additional forces.

When Yeğen Osman realized that his forces were outnumbered, he burned his camp and both Serb populated suburbs of Begrade on the Sava and Danube. He then retreated to Smederevo where he spent two days looting and burning it. Yeğen Osman left Smederevo and went to Niš via Smederevska Palanka. From Niš he wrote to the Porte reports about the siege and requested military and financial support to defend Belgrade and to annihilate the rebellious rayah. He explained that Belgrade would fall if his requests would not be met within ten days. The Porte sent him 120 bags of gold and decided to mobilize the Muslim population of Rumelia to deal with the rebellious population of Belgrade pashalik.

==== Last years ====
Yeğen Osman, by then a Pasha, then attempted to become grand vizier. Although Yeğen Osman's ambition angered the other Ottoman statesmen they were reluctant to operate against Yeğen Osman for they were afraid of the exaggerated power of Osman. However, in a war council in Edirne, Selim I Giray, the Crimean khan and a vassal of the Ottoman Empire, called on the Ottoman Porte to execute Osman When this happened, the incumbent grand vizier outlawed the sekban corps, threatening soldiers who proved unwilling to disperse with execution, and a civil war ensued. The sekbans gained the upper hand, but a further volte-face of the Ottoman central administration saw Yeğen Osman be captured and executed. This did not end the sekban's rebellions, and while in 1698 the Sultan reached an agreement with the sekbans, extending them guarantees in return for future good behaviour, the agreement was rapidly broken, and sekban's rebellions continued throughout the 18th century.

== See also ==
- Djemo the Mountaineer

== Sources ==
- Tomić, Jovan N. (1902). Deset godina iz istorije srpskog naroda i crkve pod Turcima (1683-1693). Štampano u Državnoj štampariji Kraljevine Srbije.
- umetnosti, Srpska akademija nauka i (1950). Posebna izdanja (in Serbian).
- Radonić, Jovan (1955). Durad II Branković.
- Музеј града Београда (1968). Annuaire de la ville de Beograd. Izd. Muzej grada Beograda.
- Paunović, Marinko (1968). Beograd: večiti grad. N.U. "Svetozar Marković,".
- Stanojević, Gligor (1976). Srbija u vreme bečkog rata: 1683-1699 (in Serbian). Nolit.
- Samardžić, Radovan (1981). Istorija srpskog naroda (in Serbian). Srpska knjiiževna zadruga.
- Milić, Danica (1983). Istorija Niša: Od najstarijih vremena do oslobođenja od Turaka 1878. godine. Gradina.
- Srpska akademija nauka i umetnosti; Međuodeljenjski odbor za orijentalne studije (1992). Recueil d'études orientales. Akademija.
- Istorijski institut u Beogradu (1992). Posebna izdanja. Istorijski institut u Beogradu.
- Srejović, Dragoslav; Gavrilović, Slavko; Ćirković, Sima M. (1993). Istorija srpskog naroda: knj. Srbi pod tuđinskom vlašđu, 1537-1699 (2 v.). Srpska književna zadruga. ISBN 9788637904762.
- Yaşar Yüce-Ali Sevim (1991). Türkiye Tarihi Vol III. Istanbul: İAKDTYKTTK Yayınları. pp. 205–206.

Political offices
Preceded by unknown	Beylerbey of the Rumelia Eyalet; 1687	Succeeded by unknown
