= Mikhail Khalansky =

Mikhail Georgievich Khalansky
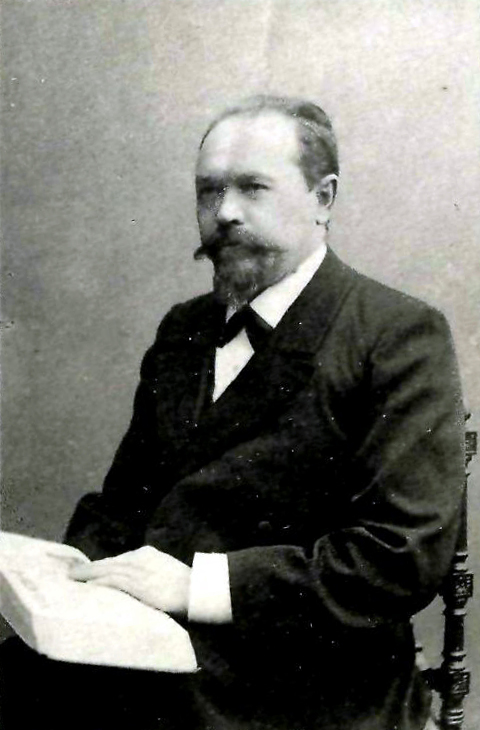
- Born: Михаил Георгиевич Халанский; November 1, 1857
- Died: March 29, 1910 (aged 52)
- Occupations: philologist and folklorist

Mikhail Georgievich Khalansky (Russian: Михаил Георгиевич Халанский) (1 November 1857 — 29 March 1910) was Slavonic philologist and folklorist and corresponding member of the academy of the Saint Petersburg Academy of Sciences since 5 December 1909. Some researchers include him into the Kharkiv Linguistic School.
