= Olena Kurylo =

Ukrainian linguist (1890–1946)

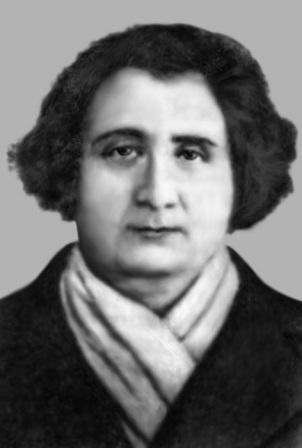
Olena Kurylo

Olena Kurylo (7 October 1890 – 1946) was a Ukrainian linguist and specialized in Ukrainian dialects and folklore. She helped in codifying the orthography in 1928-1929. Her contributions in Ukraine linguistics include both theoretical as well as practical. She was the author of textbooks in Ukrainian language, and compiled the Ukrainian scientific terminology.

== Biography ==
Born as Olena Borysivna Kurylo in a Jewish family on 7 October 1890 in Slonim, Grodno Region in Belarus, Russian Empire, Olena Kurylo studied philosophy at the university of Königsberg. In 1911 she enrolled at department of Slavic Studies in the university of Warsaw where she graduated with a teacher's certificate in 1913 which qualified her to teach pedagogy, history of pedagogy, and methods of the Russian language.

In 1921 she became a lecturer at the Institute of the People's Education, Kyiv, Ukraine. She later joined as a senior associate at the All Ukrainian Academy of Sciences (VUAN) where she served as a member of its Ethnographic, Regional Studies and Dialectological commissions. She also worked as a consultant of the Institute of the Ukrainian Scientific Language.

She played an instrumental role in the normalization of Ukrainian language and Ukrainian scientific terminology. Her Ukrainian grammar textbook for children was widely used.

In the early 1930s, she sought refuge in Moscow and started teaching there until her arrest in 1937. She was later released and was allowed to stay in the northern part of Russia, where she died in 1946.
