= National Library of Serbia =

Library in Belgrade, Serbia

- Народна библиотека Србије
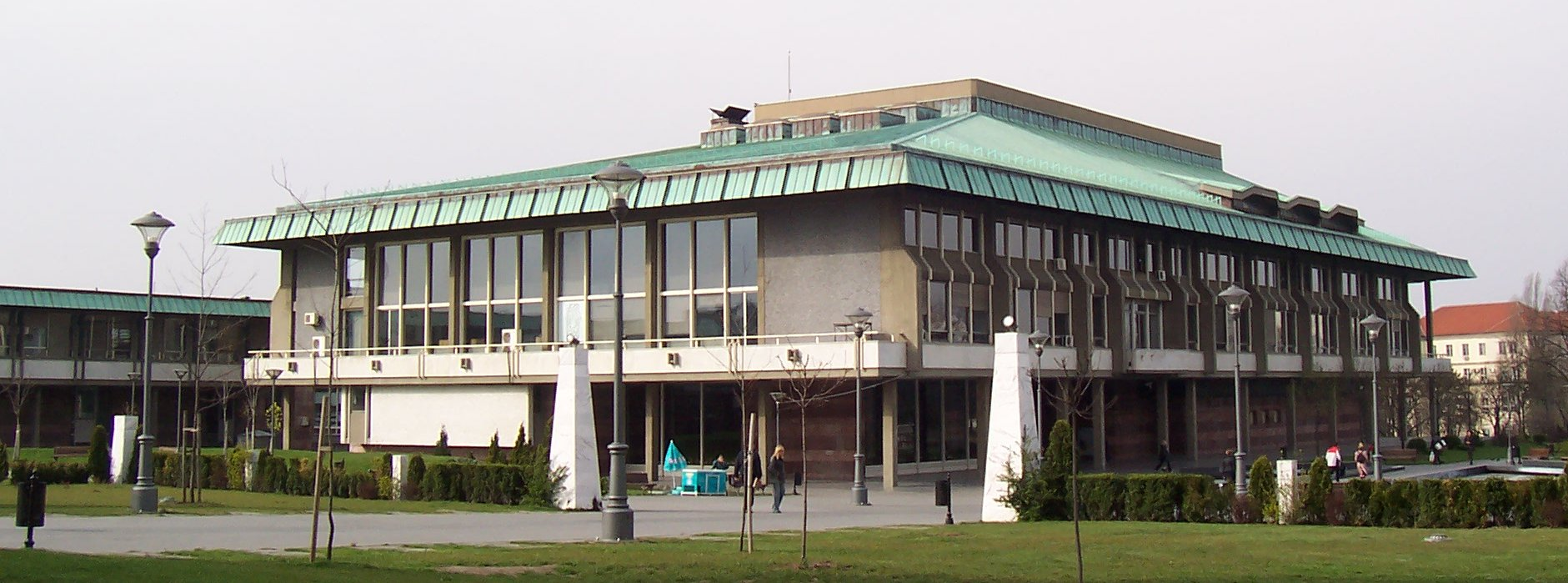
- Location within Belgrade
- 44°47′51.1″N 20°28′1.8″E
- Location: Belgrade, Serbia
- Type: National Library
- Established: 1832; 194 years ago

Collection
- Items collected: books, journals, newspapers, magazines, sound and music recordings, databases, maps, prints, drawings and manuscripts
- Size: 7,324,842 items
- Criteria for collection: Legal deposit of materials published in Serbia; materials about Serbia or materials published by the people of Serbia residing abroad; selected foreign scholarly publications and other materials.
- Legal deposit: Yes (Legal deposit law in 1832.)

Other information
- Director: Vladimir Pištalo
- Employees: 270
- Website: www.nb.rs

The National Library of Serbia (Serbian: Народна библиотека Србије, romanized: Narodna biblioteka Srbije) is the national library of Serbia, located in the capital city of Belgrade. It is the largest library and oldest institution in Serbia, having been destroyed multiple times over the last two centuries.

== History ==
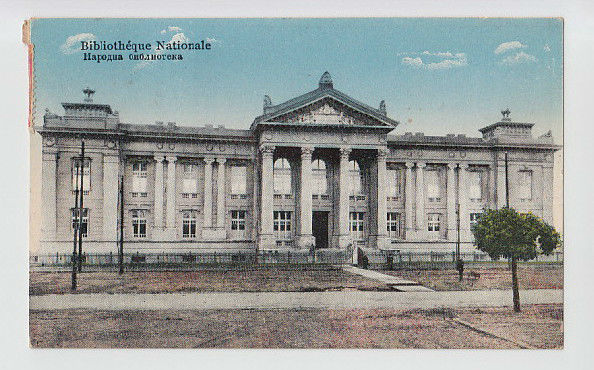
A photograph of the former library building, bombed on 6 April 1941 on the order of Adolf Hitler himself. Around 500,000 volumes and all collections of the library were destroyed in one of the largest book bonfires in European history.

In 1832, the library was established by bookbinder Gligorije Vozarović in his bookstore, and its first collection consisted of gifts of publisher and bookseller Vozarović and other Serbian cultural figures. On 28 February 1832, Dimitrije Davidović sent a letter on the organization of the library to Miloš Obrenović. In November of the same year, Prince Miloš ordered that one copy of each printed book be made available at the library.

During World War I, the Library building and collections were damaged by bombing, so the small remaining holdings were moved from Belgrade to Niš and Kragujevac for their protection. Damages, loses and lack of facilities hampered significantly reconstruction in 1918 and the ensuing years. After the War, and according to the National Library Act and the Press Law, both from 1919, the Library became the central state Library and obtained the right to acquire an obligatory copy from all over the Kingdom of Yugoslavia. With the efforts of Jovan Tomić (1903-1927), a part of the original Belgrade library collection was repatriated from Sofia, Bulgaria. In 1925, the National Library moved into a building in the Kosančićev Venac, only to be destroyed sixteen years later during World War II.

In April 1941, Luftwaffe bombing completely destroyed the building and its holdings; even though Belgrade had been officially declared an open city. The destruction included a priceless collection of 500,000 volumes, an invaluable collection of 1,424 Cyrillic manuscripts and charters, a collection of old maps, medieval manuscripts and prints of roughly 1,500 items, collections of 4,000 journals as well as 1,800 newspaper titles, its rich and irreplaceable archives of Turkish documents about Serbia and the complete correspondence of distinguished figures of the cultural and political history of Serbia, and all holdings lists and catalogs. The entire national cultural heritage existing in print almost disappeared overnight. It was not until 1969 that parts of the looted collection were discovered in West Germany and repurchased.

Following the liberation of Belgrade in 1944, under the changed social conditions, there was a period of intensive reconstruction of the lost collections and rapid development of the Library.

After the devoted work of the Library staff, the Library again opened its doors to the public in 1947. In 1954, on the 150th anniversary of the First Serbian Uprising, the construction of a new building for the National Library was allowed, and the new Library building (Architect: Ivo Kurtović) was opened with a special ceremony on 6 April 1973. It is located in the Vračar municipality, sharing the naturally elevated plateau with Temple of Saint Sava, as the highest peak of that part of Belgrade.

A major interior renovation was launched in 2007 and was ended in mid-2011, covering the following segments: the main entrance hall for users with exhibition space, the stairway of the entrance hall for users, the toilets at the ground floor and on floor, coffee bar with the kitchen, atrium, main hall on the floor level (floor, ceilings, lighting, information desks for users), all reading rooms at floor level, official entrance at the level of higher ground floor, hall and stairs, the apartment for foreign guests-researchers at the level of lower ground floor, the complete lighting of the NLS and the balconies for users at the level of the main hall and floors. The renovated area for the users was opened in September 2011, opening its doors to many existing and new users.

Nowadays, the National Library of Serbia is a modern national library. Its goals are: incorporation into the world's information flows, recognition within the world's family of national libraries, as well as becoming an information resource and drive for the development of Serbian society.

== Collections ==
General collection includes: books printed after 1868 in Serbian and other former Yugoslav languages and books printed after 1700 in foreign languages, periodicals from Serbia, former Yugoslav and abroad, bibliographies, encyclopedias, lexicons, catalogs, dictionaries, directories in classical and electronic form, organized in an open access reference stock.

Special collections contain: old and rare books containing printed books in the 18th and 19th century in languages of former Yugoslavia as well as foreign books up to 1700, bibliophile and miniature editions, literary and other manuscripts and archival documents, cartographic materials, printed music material and phonograms, photographic documents, engravings and picture material, placards and information materials, memorial libraries and legacies.

Manuscript collection includes: handwritten books from the 12th to 18th century, mostly Serbian and small numbers of Bulgarian, Macedonian and Russian editions, incunabula and old Serbian printed books from 1494 to 1638, prints from old Serbian carved tablets from 16th to 18th century, microfilms of South Slavonic Cyrillic manuscripts.

== Digital repository ==
Digital library of the National Library of Serbia contains 1.2 million scanned pages in about 70 different collections (Cyrillic manuscripts, old and rare books, books, Serbian children's digital library, newspapers and magazines, cartographic materials, engravings and art material, photographic materials, posters and documentary material, printed music and sound records, catalogs and bibliographies, miscellaneous). NLS also participates in several international projects such as World Digital Library, with the goal of making Serbian digitised heritage accessible and searchable together with the cultural heritage of other countries. NLS is a partner of the project Europeana Collections 1914-1918 and as a part of this project has published a thematic digital library Veliki rat (Great War) with valuable collections from World War I period.

== Directors ==
- Filip Nikolić (1853–1856)
- Đuro Daničić (1856–1859)
- Janko Šafarik (1861–1869)
- Stojan Novaković (1869–1874)
- Jovan Bošković (1875–1880)
- Nićifor Dučić (1880–1886)
- Milan Đ. Milićević (1886)
- Dragiša Stanojević (1900)
- Stojan Protić (1900–1901)
- Ljubomir Jovanović (1901–1903)
- Jovan Tomić (1903–1927)
- Miloš Zečević (1927–1935)
- Dragoslav Ilić (1935–1941)
- Đorđe Radojčić (1941–1945)
- Dušan Milačić (1945–1960)
- Čedomir Minderović (1960–1965)
- Milorad Panić-Surep (1965–1968)
- Svetislav Đurić (1968–1977)
- Vladimir Stevanović (1977–1979)
- Vaso Milinčević (1980–1983)
- Milan Milutinović (1983–1988)
- Milomir Petrović (1988–2001)
- Sreten Ugričić (2001–2012)
- Dejan Ristić (2012–2013)
- Svetlana Jančić (2013–2015)
- Laslo Blašković (2015–2021)
- Vladimir Pištalo (2021)

== See also ==
- List of libraries in Serbia
- List of libraries damaged during World War II
