= Risto Stijović =

Serbian sculptor

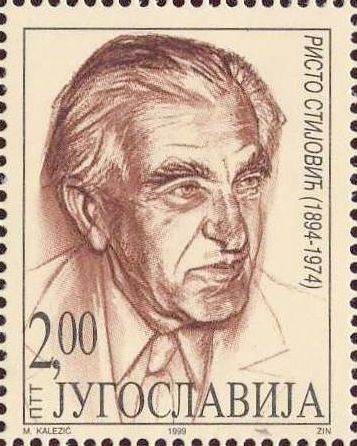
- Born: 8 October 1894; Podgorica, Principality of Montenegro
- Died: 20 December 1974 (aged 80); Belgrade, Yugoslavia
- Education: Belgrade
- Known for: Sculpture

Risto Stijović (Serbian Cyrillic: Ристо Стијовић; 8 October 1894 – 20 December 1974) was a Serbian sculptor, considered to be one of the most original artists of his time.

== Biography ==
He was born in centre of Montenegrin capital Podgorica. In 1912 he enrolled in Serbian school of fine arts in the class of Đorđe Jovanović. Stijović described himself as an ethnic Serb.

After the war broke out he joined the Serbian Army and retreated across Albania to Corfu. In 1916 he moved to Marseille, furthering his education at Marseille art school on French government scholarship, and then on to Paris the following year, where he continued at École des Beaux-Arts. He lived for years in Paris, where he met his wife, Jeanette, whom he married in 1922.

Considered one of the most talented sculptors of the early 1920s, he exhibited together with Picasso, Matisse, Pompon and Maillol. In 1928 he moved back to Belgrade where he became professor at Third Male Gymnasium. In 1941 he was arrested and imprisoned in Banjica concentration camp, where he spent the rest of WW2. After the war he continued his life in Belgrade, becoming a member of SASA in 1965.

He died in Belgrade in 1974. He was buried in the Čepurci cemetery of Podgorica.

Stijović's work was inspired by Yugoslav nature and culture. He is considered to be the most important sculptor from Montenegro and he is considered to be a master of sculpturing animal figures.

== Gallery ==
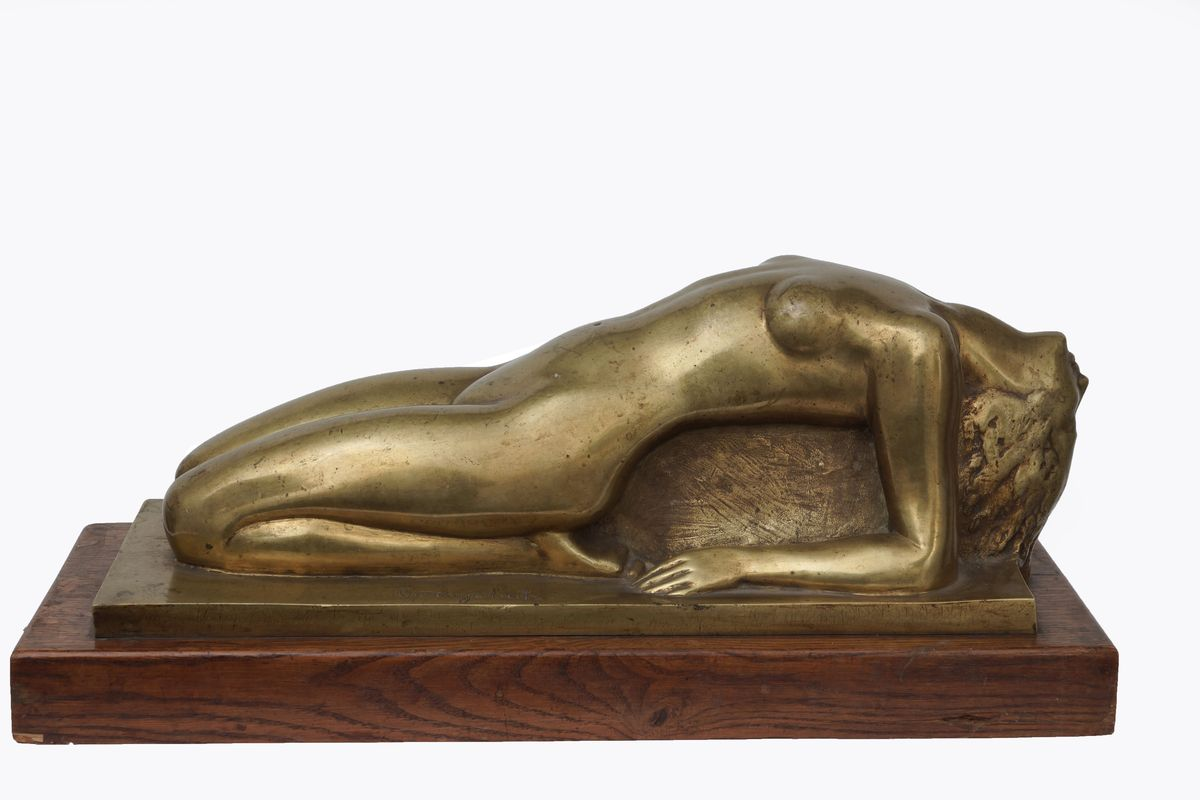
Nude, National Museum Kraljevo

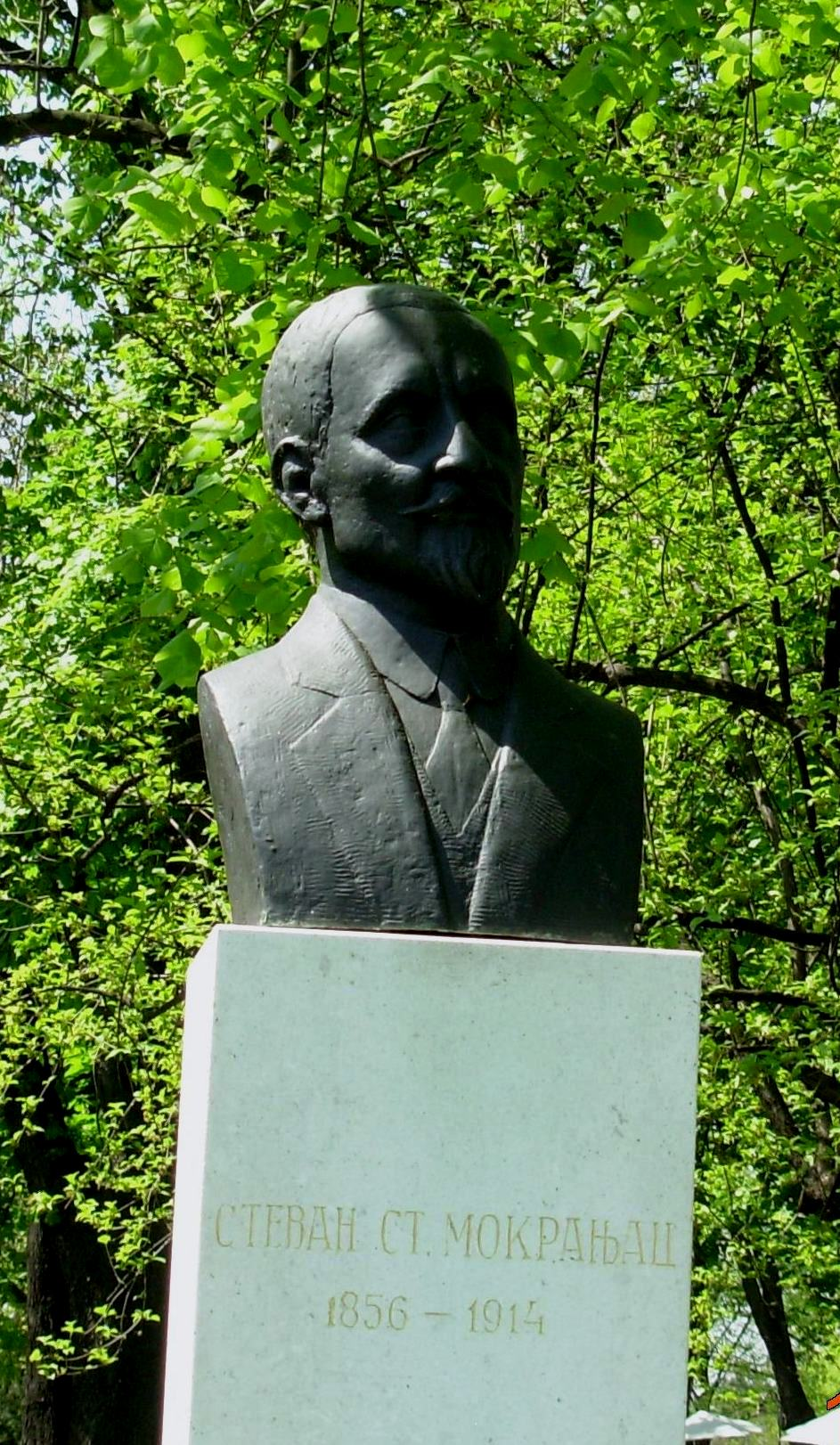
Bust of Stevan Mokranjac, Kalemegdan

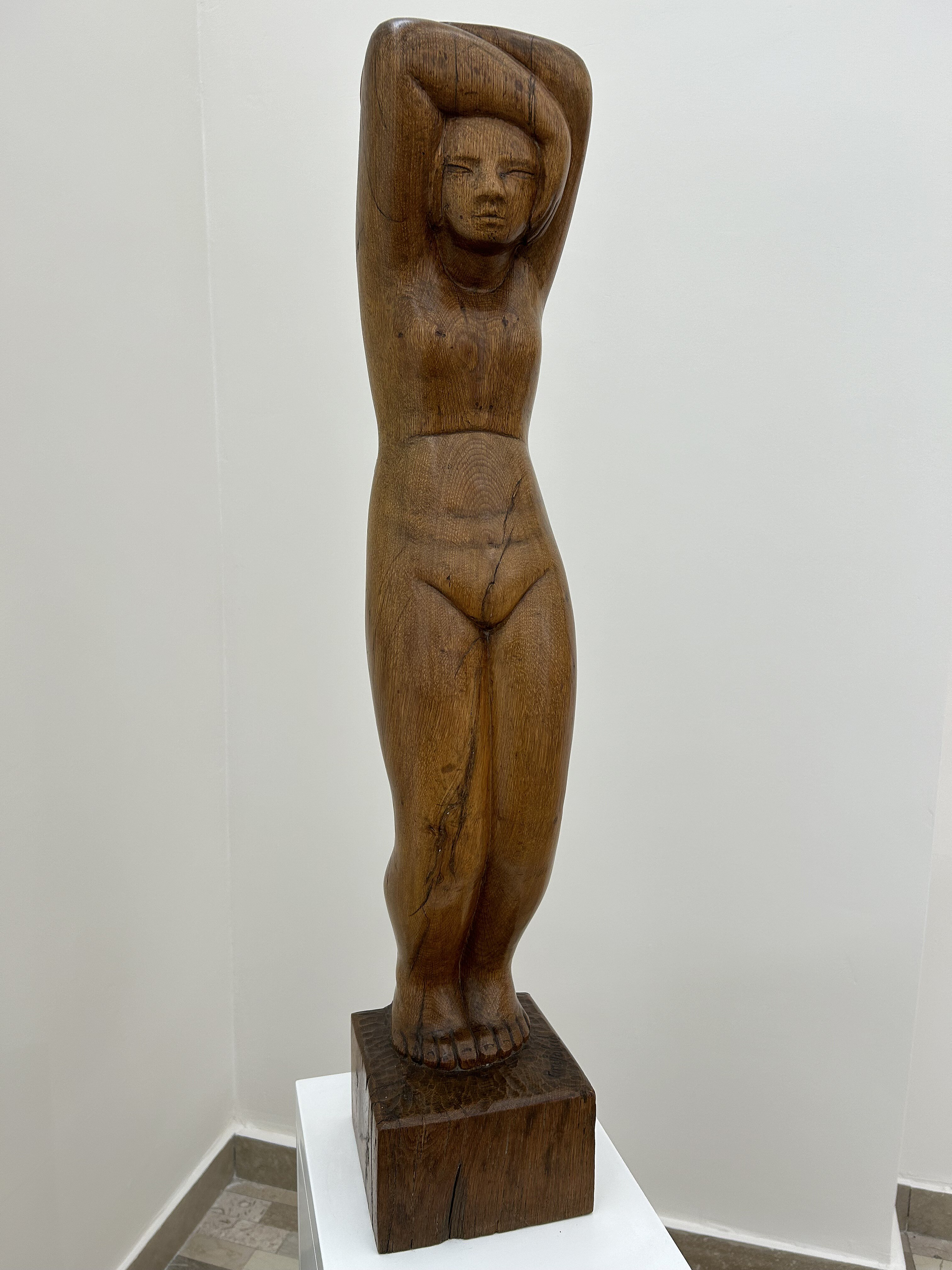
Caryatid, Pavle Beljanski Memorial Collection, 1931

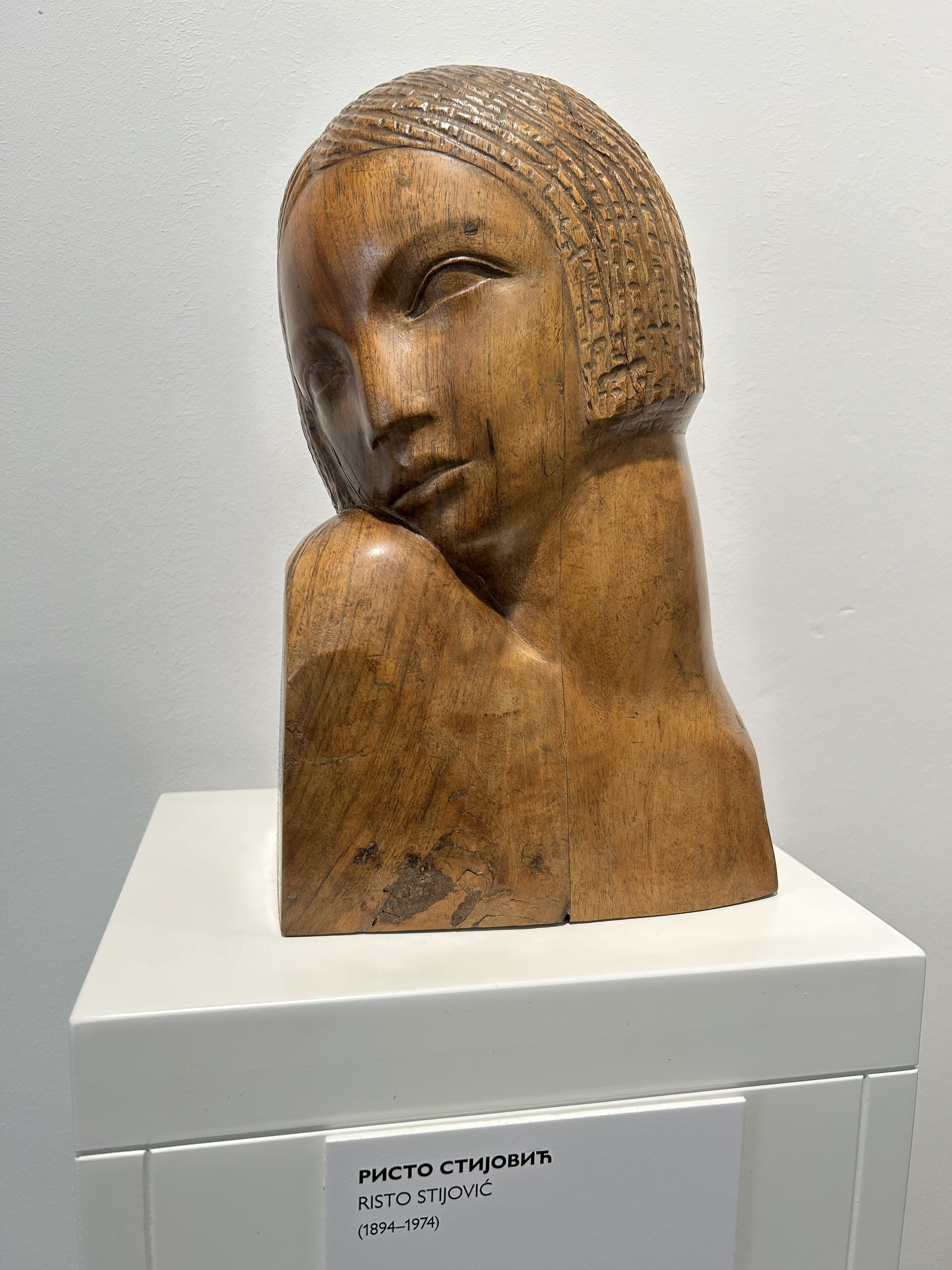
Little Girl, Pavle Beljanski Memorial Collection, 1936

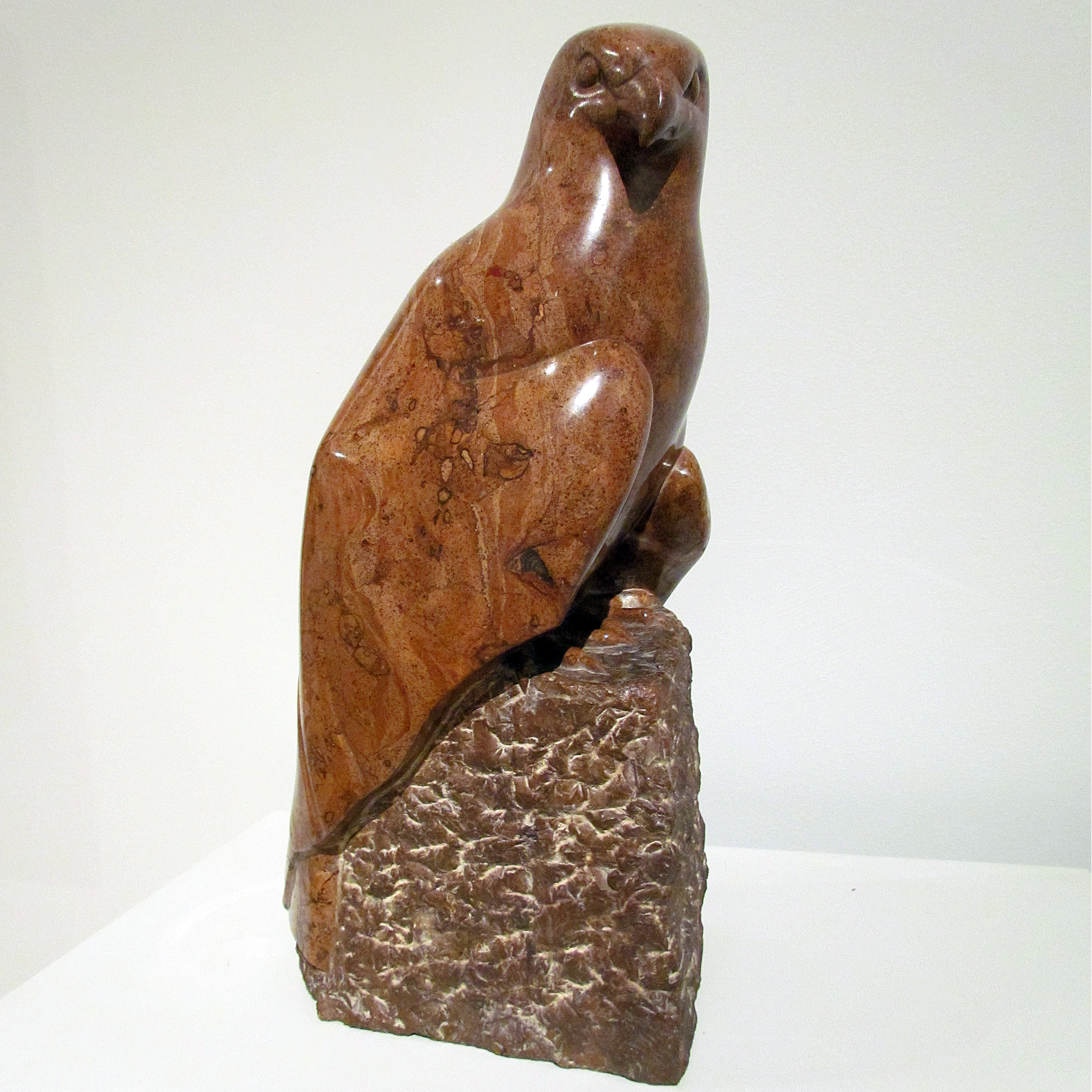
Little Eagle, 1936

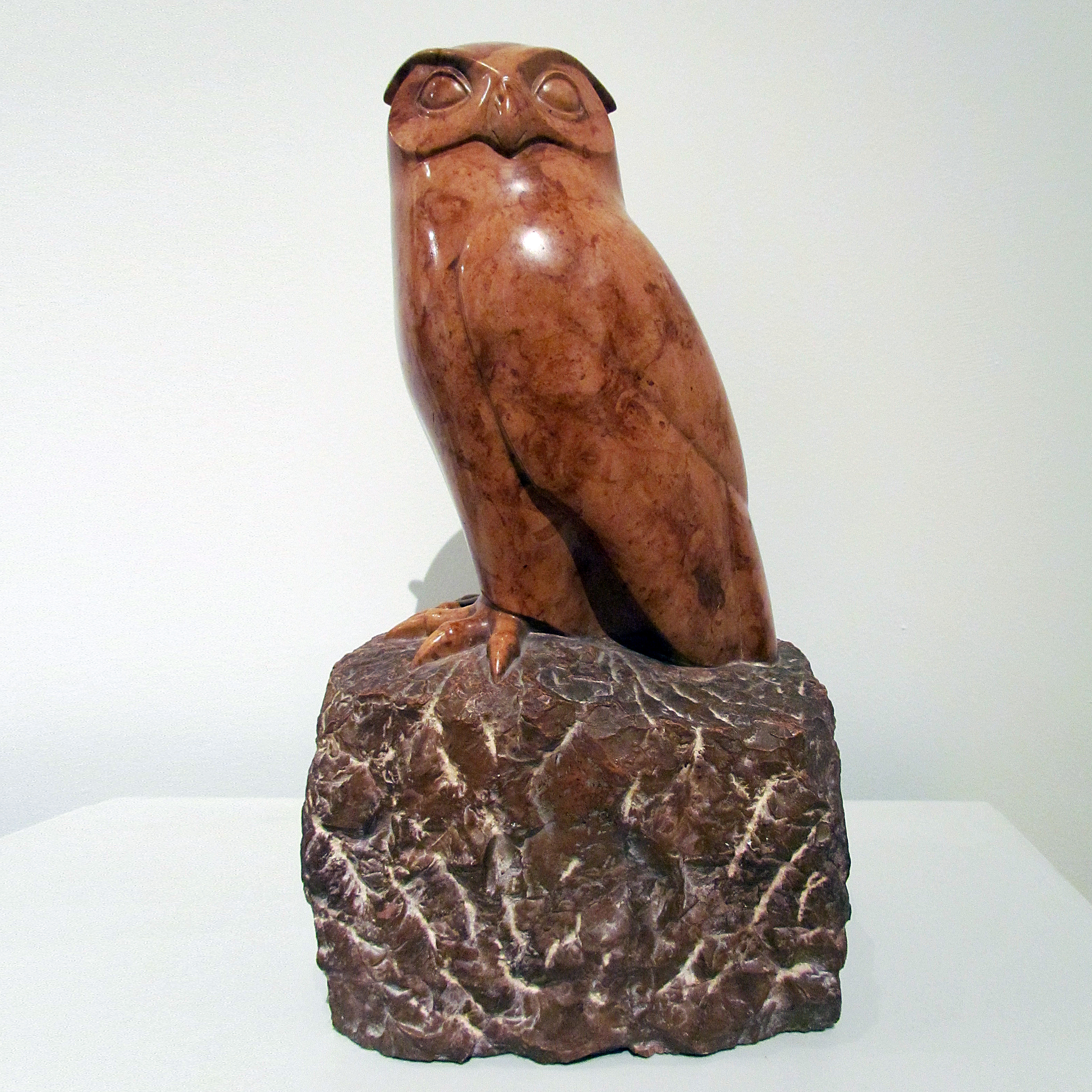
Owl, 1936
