= Dragomir Arambašić =

Serbian artist

Dragomir Arambašić (1881–1945) was a Serbian sculptor and painter.

== Biography ==
Arambašić came from a notable Serbian family, his great-grandfather was Bimbaša Stanko Arambašić of the First Serbian Uprising.

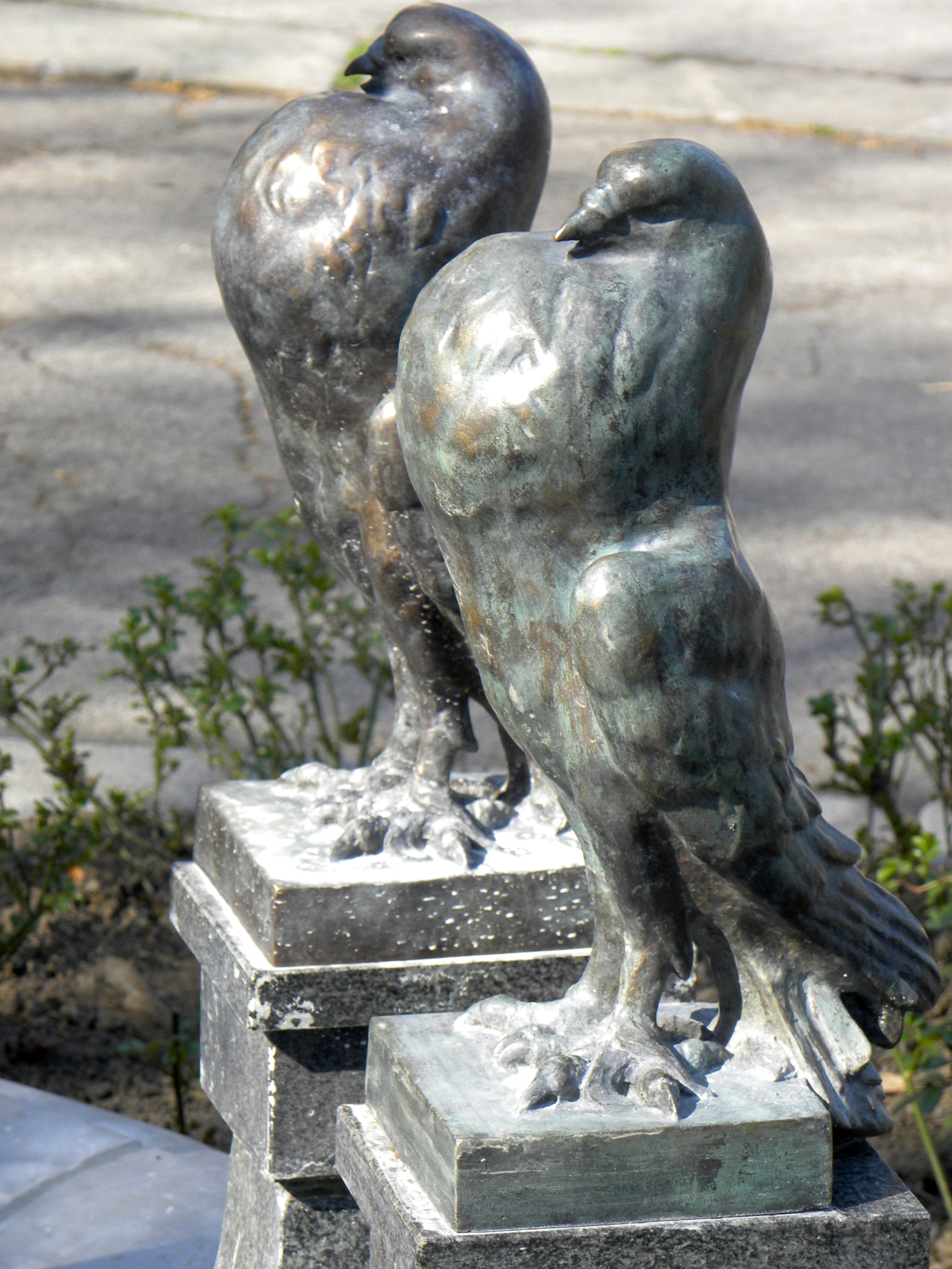
Detail from the fountain in front of Cvijeta Zuzorić Art Pavilion, Belgrade

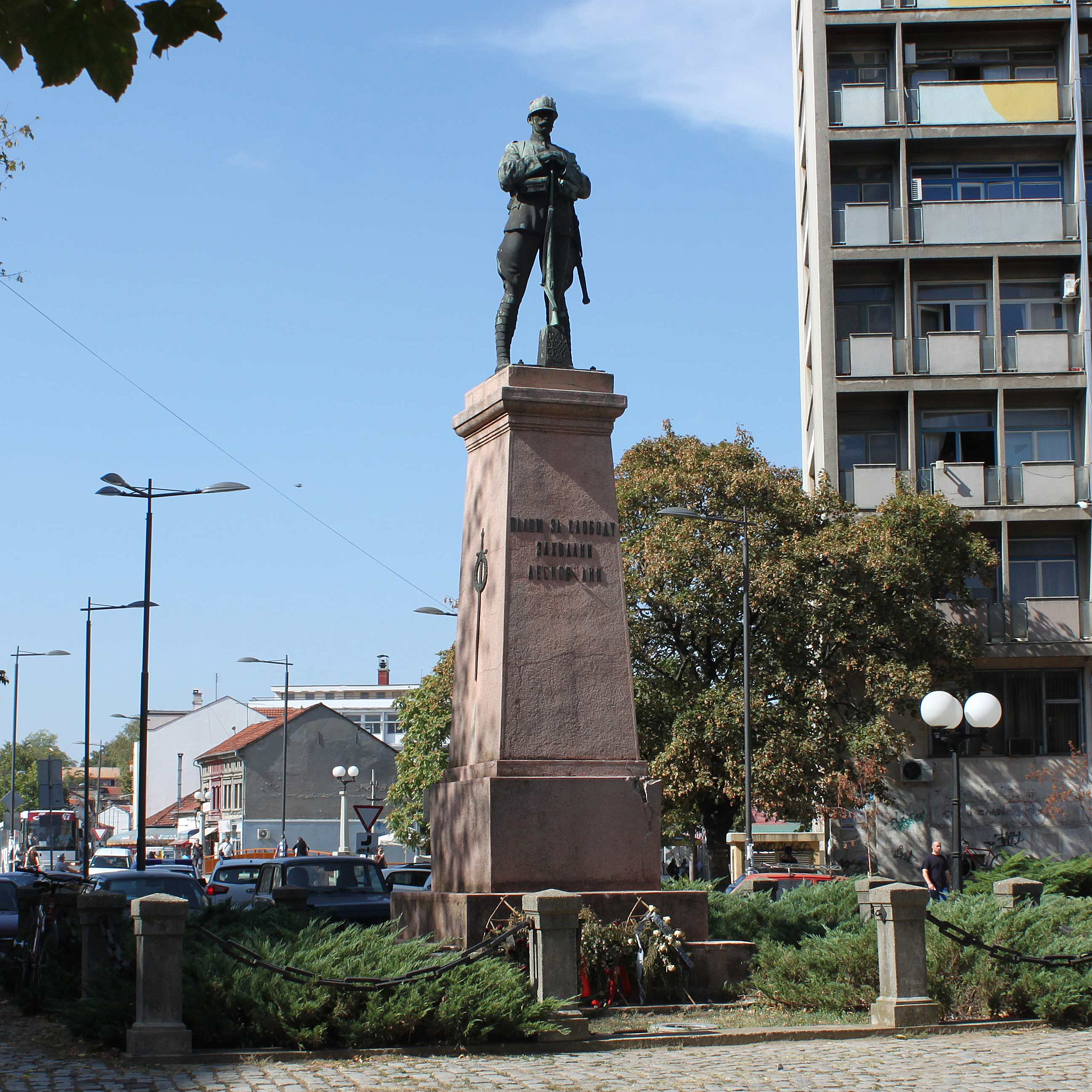
Monument dedicated to the victims of the Balkan Wars and WWI in Leskovac

His decision to practice sculpture was influenced by his acquaintance with Czech sculptor Jan Konjarek, who lived and worked in Belgrade at the time. He began his sculpture studies in Dresden with Anton von Werner and graduated from the Accademia di San Luca in Rome with Giuseppe Ferrari. He was a member of the LADA and the Association of Painters and Sculptors. Arambašić was also one of the founders of the Association of Fine Artists of Serbia.

After his studies in Munich and Dresden, Dragomir Arambašić studied in Rome and Paris. Entering the Antonin Mercié Atelier in 1912 he accepted the postulates found there, including the "Florentine renewals" evident in his works "The Girl with the Broken Tug" and "The Fisherman casts the net". In the "Mother's" sculpture by Arambašić there are influences by Auguste Rodin.

His 1925 "Defense" sculpture was erected in the lobby of the National Assembly of the Republic of Serbia and represents the personalities of the three constituent peoples, then part of the Kingdom of Yugoslavia. In 1927, the Monument to the Fallen for the Fatherland 1912-1918 is also the work of Arambašić, erected in Leskovac.

Arambašić's notable work is "Awakening Fountain", which is located in front of the central entrance to the Cvijeta Zuzorić Art Pavilion in Kalemegdan Park, and was erected in 1936. In 1920 he was awarded the Society of French Artists for his sculpture.

His house located at 20 Gospodar Jevrem Street is a monument of culture.

== See also ==
- List of Serbian painters
