= Ukrainian Physicists' Tournament for University Students =

Student competition

Ukrainian Physicists' Tournament for University Students (Ukrainian: Всеукраїнський студентський турнір фізиків, commonly abbreviated as СТФ) is a creative team competition of university students targeted to realize their potential through solving complicated scientific problems and defending their research projects in a scientific discussion, called Physics Fight. It is a part of the International Physicists' Tournament.

The look-and-feel of the competition has a lot of common with the IYPT. The problems are known a long time before the competition, are fully original and are proposed by the Organizing Committee after open selection and discussion.

However, the teams are expected to provide researchers at a significantly higher level than secondary school students do, and the jurors are expected to be much more critical about the consistence of methods, approaches and results.

== History ==
The Physicists' Tournaments for University Students were created as a continuation of school Tournaments of Young Physicists for more experienced participants. The first Open Physicists' Tournament for University Students was held in Odesa in October 2001. The following tournament received the status of All-Ukrainian, and since then the tournaments are held every academic year. Sometimes the tournaments take place in fall, sometimes in spring, so each calendar year there are 0 to 2 tournaments.

Since 2005, foreign teams started participating in the tournament: first from Russia, then from the Netherlands. It was therefore decided to organize the International Physicists' Tournament. The first International Physicists' Tournament was held in Kyiv in 2009. Since then, Ukrainian Physicists' Tournament for University Students became a step in the selection for the International Physicists' Tournament.

== Organization ==
Teams receive a list of 17 research problems and have a few months to solve them. Generally, solving these problems includes conducting experiments, constructing theoretical models, and literature analysis. Each team consists of 4-6 students.

Then the teams come together for the final stage of the tournament, and present their solutions in the format of Physics Fights. During a Physics Fight each team consequently acts as a reporter, an opponent and a reviewer. The opponent challenges the reporter for one of the problems. The reporter has the right to reject some problems, but then has to accept the challenge. One or two representatives of the reporter team make a 9-minute report on the solution of the accepted problem. Then a representative of the opponent team opposes the solution (analyses its advantages and disadvantages), and a representative of the reviewer team does a review (analyses the form of the report and the review, and the discussion between the reporter and the opponent). The reporter, the opponent and the reviewer conduct polemics on the proposed report. Jurors ask clarifying questions to the reporter, the opponent and the reviewer, and put marks for their work. The jury usually consists of the university faculties and scientists. Watching the timetable and moderating the discussion is entrusted to the chairperson.

The first few Physics Fights of the tournament are selective fights. Each team meets different competitors at random. Depending on the number of battles won and the number of points obtained, each team gets its rating, and the nine top-rated teams pass to the semifinals. Three semi-final battles are conducted, three teams in each, and the three winners pass to the final, while the three teams ranked second in their semi-final groups receive 3rd prizes. (For a small number of participants, a different scheme of the tournament is possible, without the semi-final, with free top-rated teams after selective fights passing directly to the final.) In the final, each team chooses the problem they want to report. The winner of the final receives the 1st prize and the right to participate in the International Physicists' Tournament, while two other finalists receive 2nd prizes. A bigger number of winners is possible if teams gain indistinguishably similar number of points.

== Winners of the tournament ==
Year	No.	Venue	No. teams	Gold winner(s)	Silver winner(s)	Problems
2003	1st	Odesa	11	Kharkiv University (Physics and Technology Dptm.)	Kyiv University (Radiophysics Dptm.); Kharkiv University (Physics Dptm.)	
2004	2nd	Odesa	12	Odesa University	Kyiv University (Radiophysics Dptm.); Donetsk University	
2005	3rd	Kyiv	13	Kyiv University (Radiophysics Dptm.)	Kharkiv University (Physics and Technology Dptm.); Lviv University	(in Ukrainian)
2005	4th	Kyiv	24	Lviv University, Kharkiv University (Physics and Technology Dptm.)	MFTI (Moscow), Kyiv University (Radiophysics Dptm.)	(in Ukrainian)
2006	5th	Kyiv	23	Kyiv University (Radiophysics Dptm.)	Groningen and Utrecht Universities, MFTI (Moscow), Odesa University	(in Ukrainian)
2007	6th	Kyiv	24	MFTI (Moscow), Saint Petersburg University	Kyiv University (Physics and Technology Dptm.); Kharkiv University (Physics Dptm.)	pdf
2008	7th	Kyiv	15	Kyiv University (Physics Dptm.)	Kyiv University (Radiophysics Dptm.); Kharkiv University (Physics and Technology Dptm.)	
2009	8th	Kyiv	12	Kharkiv University (Physics and Technology Dptm.)	Subcarpathian University; Kyiv University	
2011	9th	Kyiv	9	Kharkiv University (Physics and Technology Dptm.)	Lviv Polytechnic; Kyiv University (Radiophysics Dptm.)	
2011	10th	Kharkiv	12	Kyiv University (Radiophysics Dptm.); Kharkiv University (Physics and Technology Dptm.)	Lviv Polytechnic; Odesa University	
2012	11th	Kharkiv	11	Kyiv University (Radiophysics Dptm.); Kharkiv University (Physics and Technology Dptm.)	Donetsk National University; Subcarpathian University	
2013	12th	Kharkiv	8	Kharkiv University (Physics and Technology Dptm.)	Kyiv University (Radiophysics Dptm.); Kharkiv University (Physics Dptm.)	
2015	13th	Kharkiv	6	Kharkiv University (Physics and Technology Dptm.)	Kyiv Polytechnic Institute; Kharkiv University (Physics and Technology Dptm.)	
2015	14th	Kyiv	12	Lviv Polytechnic	Kharkiv University (Physics and Technology Dptm.); Kharkiv University (Physics Dptm.)	
2016	15th	Kyiv	7	Kharkiv University (Physics and Technology Dptm.); Kharkiv University (Physics Dptm.)	Kyiv University (Radiophysics Dptm.)	
2017	16th	Kyiv	14	Kharkiv University (Physics and Technology Dptm. and Physics Dptm.)	Kyiv University (Physics Dptm.)	
2018	17th	Kyiv	11	Kharkiv University (Physics and Technology Dptm. and Physics Dptm.)	Kyiv University (Physics Dptm.); Kyiv University (Radiophysics Dptm.)	
2019	18th	Kyiv		Kharkiv University (Physics and Technology Dptm. and Physics Dptm.)		
2022	19th	online	6	Kharkiv University (Physics and Technology Dptm. and Physics Dptm.)	Kyiv University (Physics Dptm.); Kyiv University (Radiophysics Dptm.)	
2023	20th	online	4	Kyiv University (Radiophysics Dptm.)	Kharkiv University (Physics and Technology Dptm. and Physics Dptm.)	
