= Swiss Physical Society =

- Abbreviation: SPS
- Formation: 1908
- Location: Switzerland
- Members: 1100 (2022)
- Website: www.sps.ch

The Swiss Physical Society (SPS) (German: Schweizerische Physikalische Gesellschaft / SPG, French: Société Suisse de Physique / SSP) is the national Swiss professional society for physicists working in teaching, research, development and industry. It was founded in May 1908. SPS is involved in education and the promotion of young physicists, and supports Swiss participation in activities such as the International Physicists' Tournament. Academic conferences, symposia and workshops are organised by the Swiss Physical Society.

== Role and international links ==
With roughly 1'100 members, the SPS describes itself as the largest member organisation of the Swiss Academy of Sciences (SCNAT). Internationally, the SPS is one of the national member societies of the European Physical Society (EPS). The EPS has 42 national member societies, which together represent more than 120'000 physicists and members in Europe.

The SPS cooperates with neighbouring national physical societies. Joint annual meetings are regularly organised with the Austrian Physical Society. Together with the French Physical Society, it established the Charpak-Ritz Prize, which recognises contributions to physics in Switzerland and France.

The historical leadership and membership of the society have included a number of internationally prominent physicists. Former presidents include Peter Debye, Paul Scherrer and Wolfgang Pauli, while the society's centenary history records among its members physicists including Albert Einstein, Felix Bloch, Karl Alexander Müller and Heinrich Rohrer.

== Publications ==
From 1928 to 1999, the Swiss Physical Society published Helvetica Physica Acta. In 2000, Helvetica Physica Acta merged with the theoretical-physics series of the Annales de l'Institut Henri Poincaré to form Annales Henri Poincaré, an international peer-reviewed journal of theoretical and mathematical physics. The journal is jointly associated with the Institut Henri Poincaré and the Swiss Physical Society.

The society also publishes SPS Communications (German: SPG Mitteilungen, French: Communications de la SSP), its members' journal, approximately two to four times per year. It contains society news as well as articles on current research in Switzerland, historical developments and other topics in physics. The society additionally publishes the SPS Newsletter and SPS Focus, a series in which individual topics are presented for a broader audience.

== Awards ==
The SPS has been awarding prizes for outstanding achievements by young physicists since 1991. The SPS Awards are the most prestigious national distinctions for doctoral and early-career research in physics. Eligible work has to have been carried out by Swiss nationals or within Switzerland and is judged on its significance, quality and originality.

The prizes are competitive and a category does not need to produce a winner every year. SPS records several years in which individual categories had no winner; in 2022, for example, the newly introduced Energy Technology award sponsored by Hitachi Energy was not awarded because the jury did not reach consensus on a candidate. Among earlier recipients, Didier Queloz received the 1996 SPS General Physics award for the first observation of a planet outside the Solar System. In 2019, Queloz and Michel Mayor shared half of the 2019 Nobel Prize in Physics "for the discovery of an exoplanet orbiting a solar-type star".

Separate from the early-career SPS Awards, the society jointly awards the Charpak-Ritz Prize with the French Physical Society. Created in 2016 and first awarded in 2017, it recognises contributions to physics or its development in Switzerland and France. In even-numbered years, candidates are nominated by the SPS and the winner is selected by the French Physical Society; in odd-numbered years the roles are reversed.

== Honorable Members ==
Honorable members of the Swiss Physical Society are:

- 1965: Prof. Markus Fierz (†2006)
- 1976: Prof. Georg A. Busch (†2000)
- 1985: Prof. Martin Peter (†2002)
- 1990: Prof. Jean-Pierre Blaser (†2019)
- 1990: Dr. Heinrich Rohrer (†2013)
- 1991: Prof. K. Alex Müller (†2023)
- 2001: Prof. Jean-Pierre Borel (†2020)
- 2001: Prof. Hans Frauenfelder
- 2001: Prof. Hermann Grunder
- 2001: Prof. Verena Meyer (†2018)
- 2001: Prof. Ambros P. Speiser (†2003)
- 2005: Prof. Charles P. Enz
- 2005: Prof. Hans Rudolf Ott
- 2010: Prof. Hans Beck
- 2010: Prof. Øystein Fischer (†2013)
- 2010: Prof. Hans-Joachim Güntherodt (†2014)
- 2010: Prof. T. Maurice Rice (†2024)
- 2010: Prof. Louis Schlapbach
- 2011: Dr. J. Georg Bednorz
- 2011: Prof. Jean-Pierre Eckmann
- 2011: Prof. Jürg Fröhlich
- 2011: Prof. Martin C. E. Huber
- 2014: Prof. Francis Troyon (†2016)
- 2015: Prof. Herwig Schopper
- 2016: Prof. Piero Martinoli
- 2016: Prof. Norbert Straumann
- 2018: Prof. Maurice Bourquin
- 2020: Prof. Ralph Eichler
- 2020: Prof. Kathrin Altwegg-von Burg
- 2021: Prof. Friedrich-Karl Thielemann
- 2022: Prof. Felicitas Pauss
- 2023: Prof. Ruth Durrer
- 2023: Dr. Bernhard Braunecker
- 2025: Leonid Rivkin
- 2025: Christophe Rossel

== Past presidents ==
- 1908-1910: Pierre Chappuis
- 1910-1912: Jósef de Kowalski
- 1912-1913: Pierre Weiss
- 1913-1914: Jósef de Kowalski
- 1914-1916: Charles-Eugène Guye
- 1916-1918: August Hagenbach
- 1918-1919: François Borini
- 1919-1920: Paul Gruner
- 1920-1921: Adrien Jacquerod
- 1921-1923: Hans Zickendrath
- 1923-1925: Léon-Albert Perrier
- 1925-1927: Peter Debye
- 1927-1929: Adrien Jacquerod
- 1929-1931: Heinrich Greinacher
- 1931-1933: Paul Scherrer
- 1933-1936: Léon-Albert Perrier
- 1936-1938: Franz Tank
- 1938-1941: Max Wehrli
- 1941-1943: Jean Weiglé
- 1943-1945: Hans König
- 1945-1947: Gregor Wentzel
- 1947-1949: Ernst Miescher
- 1949-1951: Henri Mügeli
- 1951-1953: André Mercier
- 1953-1955: Paul Huber
- 1955-1957: Wolfgang Pauli
- 1957-1959: Jean Rossel
- 1959-1961: Hans Staub
- 1961-1963: Dominique Rivier
- 1963-1965: Jean Pierre Blaser
- 1965-1967: Otto Huber
- 1967-1969: K. P. Meyer
- 1969-1971: Pierre de Haller
- 1971-1973: Ernst Heer
- 1973-1975: Jorgen Lykke Olsen
- 1975-1977: Verena Meyer
- 1977-1979: Philippe Choquard
- 1979-1981: Iris Zschokke
- 1981-1983: Paul Dinichert
- 1983-1985: Jean Kern
- 1985-1987: Peter Minkowski
- 1987-1989: Samuel Steinemann
- 1989-1991: Walter Kündig
- 1991-1993: Jean Muller
- 1993-1995: Hans-Jörg Schötzau
- 1995-1997: Yves Baer
- 1997-1999: Peter Oelhafen
- 1999-2002: Thomas A. Jung
- 2002-2006: Jean-Philippe Ansermet
- 2006-2008: Tibor Gyalog
- 2008-2012: Christophe Rossel
- 2012-2014: Andreas Schopper
- 2014-2017: Minh Quang Tran
- 2017-2021: Hans Peter Beck
- 2021-2023: Johan Chang
- 2023-2025: Teresa Montaruli
- 2025-: Michel Calame
