= School of Physics and Technology of University of Kharkiv =

Coordinates: 50°05′39″N 36°15′44″E

School of Physics and Technology
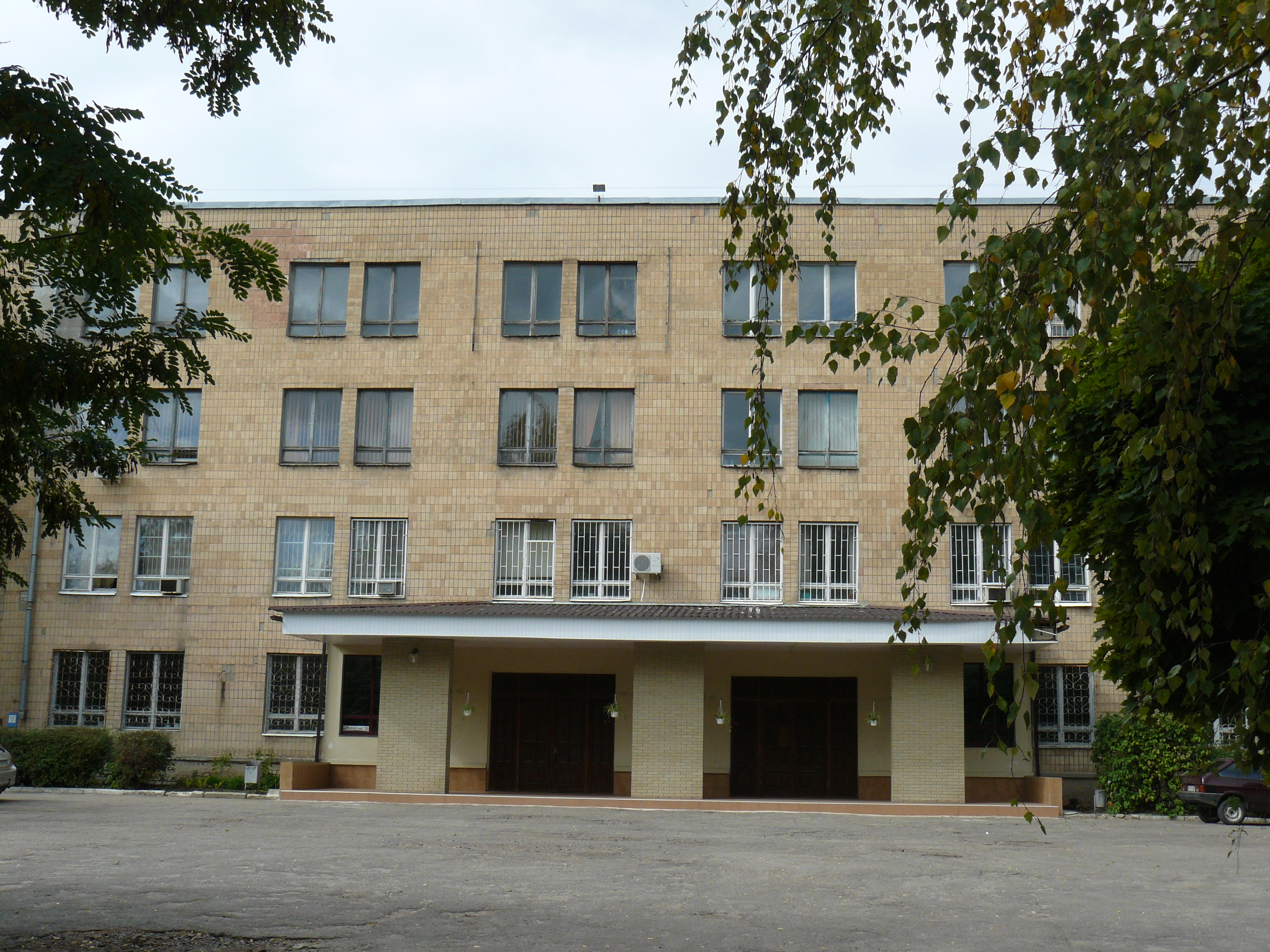
- Faculty building
- Affiliations: Vasyl Karazin Kharkiv National University
- Location: Kharkiv, Ukraine
- Website: physics-technology.karazin.ua

The School of Physics and Technology (abbreviated Phystech) is one of the four physics schools of the V. N. Karazin Kharkiv National University. It specializes in the fields of theoretical physics, nuclear physics, plasma physics, materials science and medical physics. Distinctive features of the school include close cooperation with the Kharkiv Institute of Physics and Technology, and fundamental theoretical training in style of the Landau school, to which many instructors of the faculty belong.

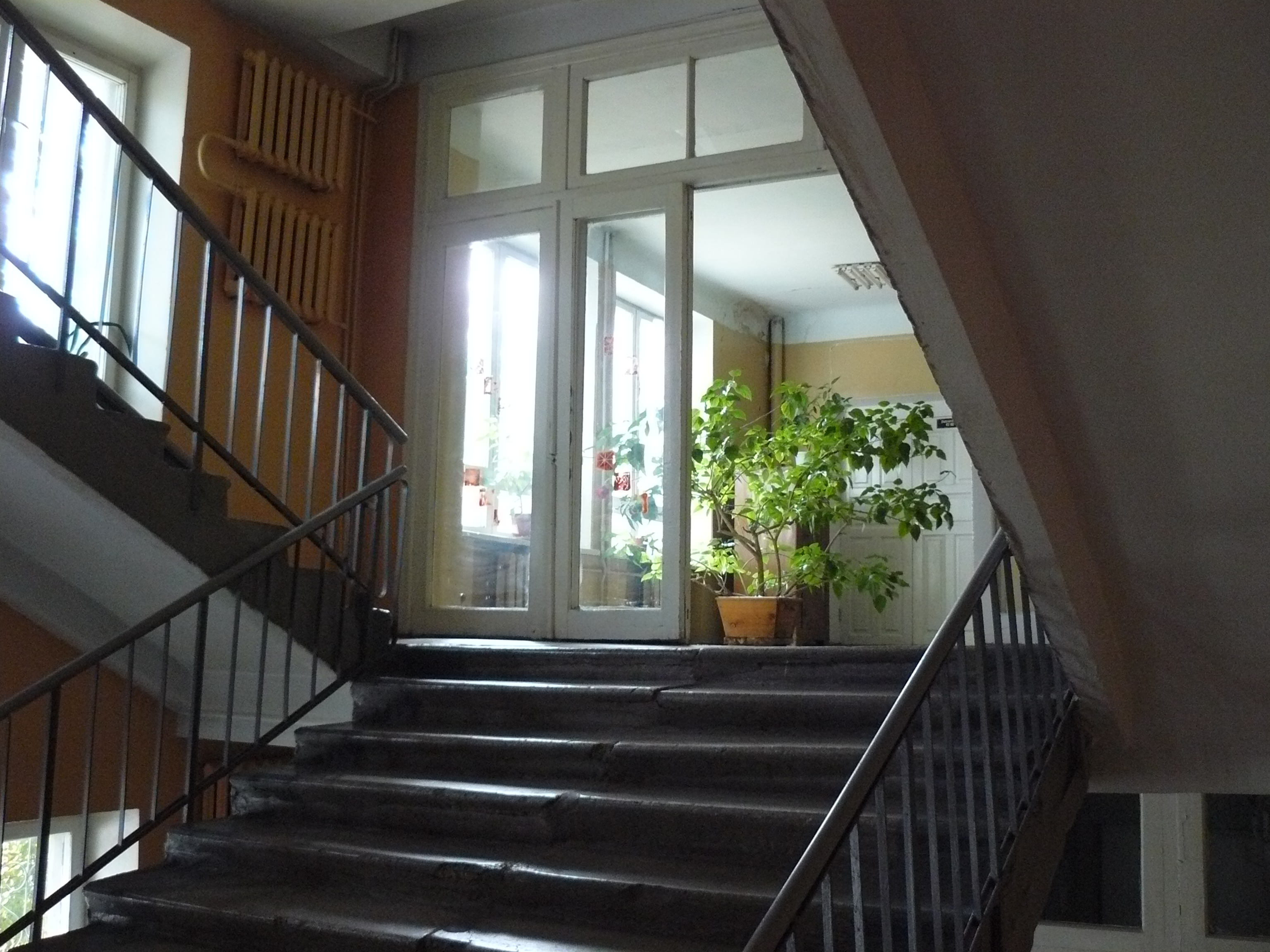
In the school building

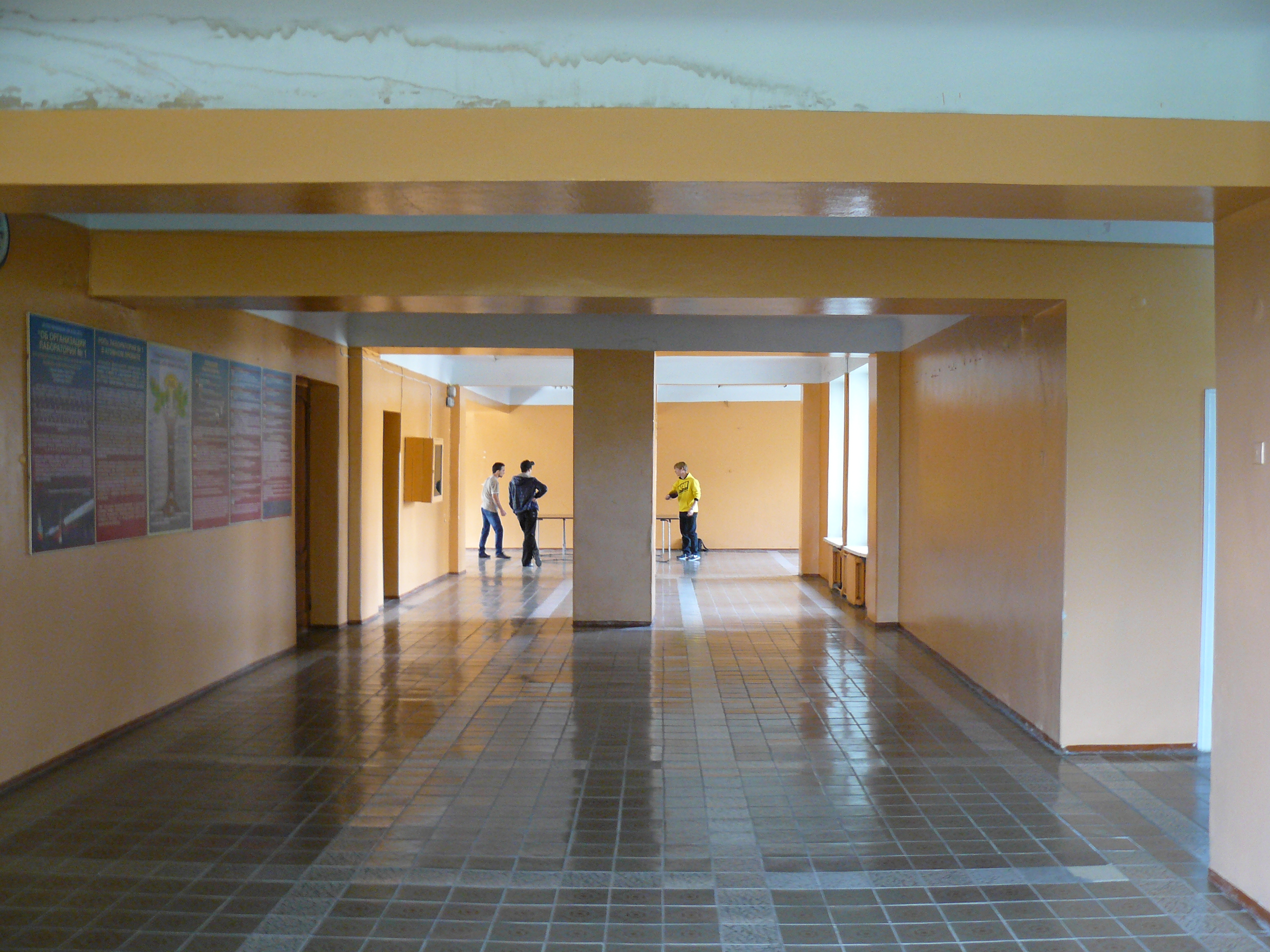
Hall in the school building

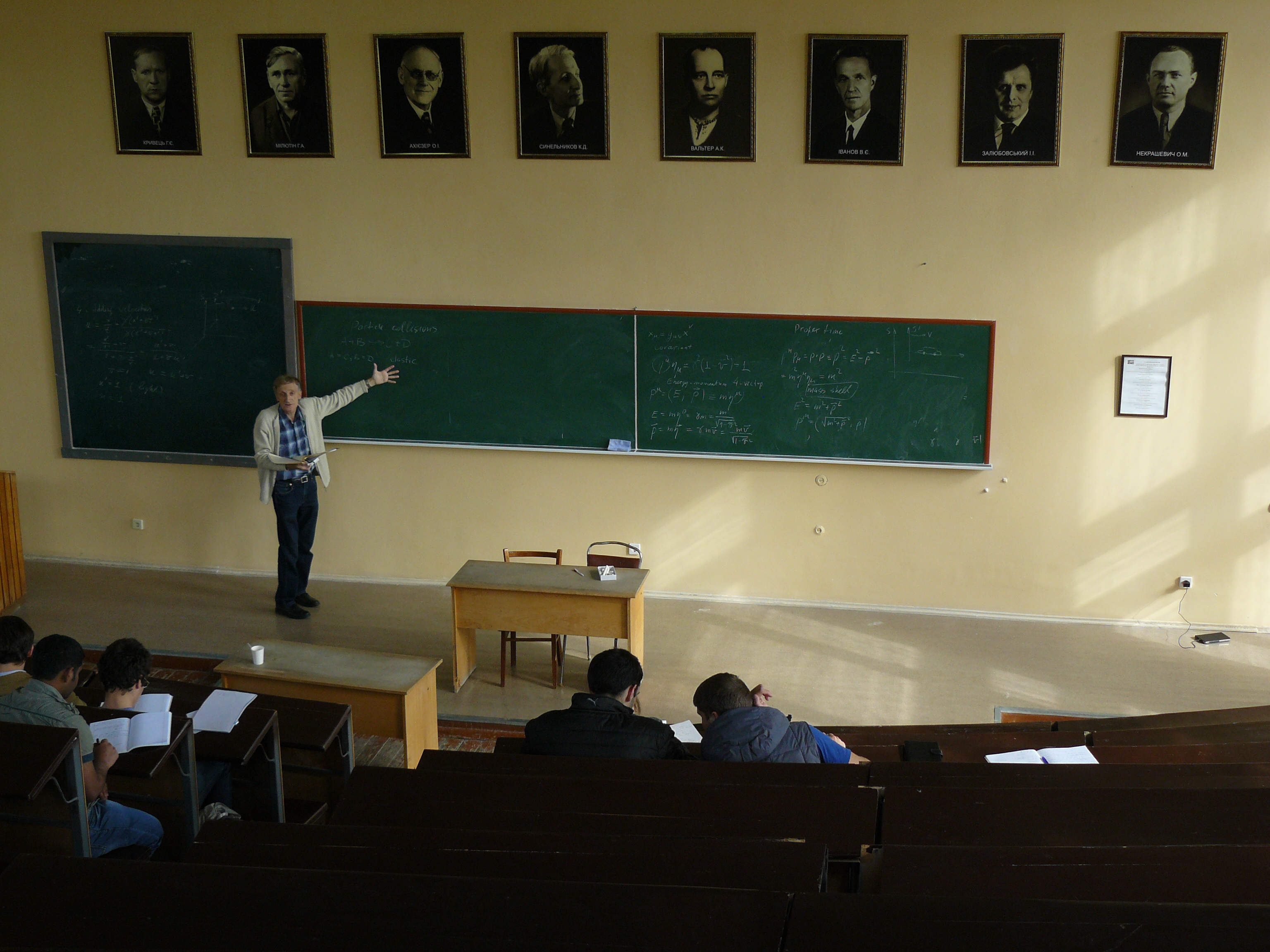
Lecture by Prof. Korchin on particle physics

== History ==
The school was established in 1962 on the basis of the Department of Nuclear Physics of the School of Physics and Mathematics. The Department of Nuclear Physics existed since 1946, while some of the other departments incorporated into the school existed since the 1930s. In 1969 the school moved from the main building of the university to a separate campus in the Pyatikhatki district, to be closer to the Kharkiv Institute of Physics and Technology.

== Curriculum ==
The first three years of bachelor studies at the school are devoted to general physical and mathematical training. In semesters 1–4, students attend courses on general physics (mechanics, thermodynamics, electricity and optics), in semesters 5-6 – courses on atomic and nuclear physics. The program of these courses is close to the textbooks of Sivukhin and Savelyev. In semesters 1-5 a number of mathematical disciplines are taught: calculus, analytic geometry, higher algebra, complex analysis, equations of mathematical physics, probability and statistics, and numerical methods. General physics and mathematical courses are accompanied by practical classes and extensive homework assignments. In semesters 4-8 a number of courses in theoretical physics are taught, largely based on the Course of Theoretical Physics by Landau and Lifshitz: theoretical mechanics, electrodynamics, quantum mechanics, continuum mechanics, thermodynamics, statistical physics.

After the 6th semester, students are distributed among the departments of the school, depending on their preferences and ranking. There are 4 departments in the school:

- Aleksander Akhiezer Department of Theoretical Nuclear Physics and Higher Mathematics
- Department of Nuclear and Medical Physics
- Department of Applied Physics and Plasma Physics
- Department of Reactor Materials and Physical Technologies

Starting from the 7th semester, the curriculum includes special courses, which are different for each department.

In semesters 6–7, the student writes a bachelor's thesis under supervision of a thesis advisor, who is chosen by the student or appointed by the department head.

During the 5th year, special courses dominate the curriculum, while the 6th year is entirely devoted to the writing of the student's master's thesis.

The entire duration of education at the school consists of 4 years of bachelor studies and 2 years of master studies.

== Departments ==
The school has four departments. The Aleksander Akhiezer Department of Theoretical Nuclear Physics and Higher Mathematics prepares theoretical physicists with a broad base of fundamental physical knowledge. The Department of Nuclear and Medical Physics conducts training for specialists in two different areas — experimental nuclear physics and medical physics. The Department of Applied Physics and Plasma Physics trains specialists in plasma physics, covering both the theoretical and the experimental aspects of plasma physics. The Department of Reactor Materials and Physical Technologies specializes mainly in radiation materials science and vacuum coatings.

=== Aleksander Akhiezer Department of Theoretical Nuclear Physics and Higher Mathematics ===
The Department of Theoretical Nuclear Physics and Higher Mathematics is a successor to the Department of Theoretical Physics, which was created at the School of Physics and Mathematics of Kharkiv State University in 1933, and thus it is older than the School of Physics and Technology. Lev Landau played a crucial role in establishing the department. Here he started implementing his plans for the reorganization of training of theoretical physicists and creation of his Course of Theoretical Physics. It was Landau who compiled the first programs for the courses on theoretical physics at the department. In 1940–1973, the department was headed by Aleksander Akhiezer, whose name is now being carried by the department.

The department is considered to be the most difficult department at the school. Students of the department study special courses on elementary particles, quantum electrodynamics, general relativity, astrophysics, theoretical nuclear physics, solid-state theory, and plasma physics. In addition, the professors of the department teach most of the bachelors-level mathematics and theoretical physics courses at the school.

=== Department of Nuclear and Medical Physics ===
The department was created in 1937 by Anton Valter. The name of the department changed several times: Department of Physics of the Atomic Nucleus, Department of Physics of the Atomic Nucleus and Electronics, Department of Electronic Processes, Department of structure of matter, Department of Experimental Nuclear Physics. In 2012, the Department of Experimental Nuclear Physics was joined with the Department of Medical Physics, forming a Department of Nuclear and Medical Physics.

The specialty Medical Physics (with specializations in Medical Radiation Physics and Medical Biophysics) has existed at the school since 2005. Students studying nuclear physics and medical physics study in different groups and attend different courses: nuclear physicists specialize in experimental nuclear physics, while medical physics students study biology and medical equipment in more detail.

=== Department of Applied Physics and Plasma Physics ===
The Department of Plasma Physics was created in 1962 under the direction of Cyril Sinelnikov. The Department of General and Applied Physics was established in 1969 to conduct courses in general physics, electronics and engineering graphics. In 2012, the Department of Plasma Physics and the Department of General and Applied Physics were merged into the Department of Plasma Physics and Applied Physics.

=== Department of Reactor Materials and Physical Technologies ===
The Department of Reactor Materials was established in 1962 on the initiative of the academician Victor Ivanov (KIPT director 1964–1980), who headed the department from 1962 to 1969. In 2012, it was merged with two other departments (the Department of Physical Technologies and the Department of Electrophysics and Radiation Technologies), and formed the Department of Reactor Materials and Physical Technologies.

== Achievements ==
The school's teams are perennial winners of the Ukrainian Physicists' Tournaments for University Students, outstripping all other physics schools in Ukraine. Three times, students of the school won the International Physicists' Tournament (in 2011, 2015 and 2017).

== Traditions ==
During the summer vacations after their 3rd year, student participate in summer practice, which includes lectures by local scientists, as well as excursions to KIPT and to laboratories of different departments of the school.

On Fridays, the seminar Problems of Modern Physics is held at the school (jointly with KIPT).

In August, before the beginning of the academic year, additional math classes for new freshmen are held, in which the school course of algebra and introductory calculus is rehearsed. The classes are organized and taught by undergraduate students of the school.

At the end of the fall semester, the Day of Phystech is held, which includes a concert prepared by the students themselves.

Young teachers and students of the school organize unofficial additional classes and seminars, usually held in the evening after the principal classes, and thus called Evening Phystech.

The Charitable Foundation of the Phystech Alumni collects donations from alumni of the school, mostly the ones working outside Ukraine as scientists, and directs the money on different projects, mostly related to improving infrastructure of the school.

== Notable faculty and alumni ==
- Aleksander Akhiezer – academician, theoretical physicist, one of the founders of the school
- Cyril Sinelnikov – academician, specialist in plasma physics, one of the founders of the school
- Volodymyr Semynozhenko – academician, former Vice Prime Minister of Ukraine
- Boris Pritychenko – editor-in-chief of the journal Atomic Data and Nuclear Data Tables
- Kostya Ostrikov – professor at Queensland University of Technology
- Igor Girka – corresponding member of NASU, specialist in plasma physics, dean of the school

== Literature ==
- Толок В. Т. Физика и Харьков // Физическая инженерия поверхности. — Т. 2, No. 4. (in Ukrainian)
- Толок В. Т., Коган В. С., Власов В. В. Физико-технический факультет Харьковского национального университета имени В. Н. Каразина // Физика и Харьков. — Харьков: Тимченко, 2009. — С. 257–287. — 408 с. (in Ukrainian)
- Власов В. В., Ходусов В. Д. К 40-летию физико-технического факультета Харьковского национального университета им. В. Н. Каразина // Вестник Харьковського национального университета имени В. Н. Каразина. Серия физическая «Ядра, частицы, поля». — 2002. — Вып. 114. — No. 4. (in Russian)
- Дончик И. Н., Таньшина А. В. (сост.). Фізико-технічний факультет: минуле і сьогодення // Залюбовский Илья Иванович: учёный, учитель, человек. — Харьков: Издательство Харьковского национального университета имени В. Н. Каразина, 2009. — С. 19–27. — 148 с. (in Ukrainian)
- Власов В. В., Гирка И. А., Азаренков Н. А., Ходусов В. Д. Харьковскому физтеху 50 лет. — Харьков: ООО «Издательство Майдан», 2012. — 188 с. (in Russian)
