= POISK Centre =

University unit in Saint Petersburg, Russia

The POISK Centre
- Established: 2004
- Affiliations: Saint Petersburg State University
- Location: Saint Petersburg, Russia
- Website: The POISK Centre's Official Website

The POISK Centre (in Russian:Центр «ПОИСК») is an educational and research organization founded in 2004 at Saint Petersburg State University (Russia). Its primary aim is to encourage secondary school students and university students to do independent scientific research.

The POISK Centre supports educational programs that motivate youth to develop an interest in physics and natural sciences, and to involve them in “what a real scientist does” as early as possible. These activities include tight collaboration with leading universities and secondary schools in Russia and abroad, joint seminars and workshops, regular international scientific conferences, language programs, but also the promotion of research competitions, such as the Young Physicists' Tournament.

POISK means ‘search’ in Russian, but it is also a Russian abbreviation for the Support Centre for Olympiads and Intellectual Competitions.

== Achievements ==
Since 2004, the POISK Centre is the only university-based organization in Russia that is being selecting, supervising and preparing the National team that represents Russia at the International Young Physicists' Tournament.

The POISK Centre's team has been a participant of IYPTs in 2004 (Brisbane, Australia), 2005 (Winterthur, Switzerland) and 2006 (Bratislava, Slovakia) with significant success, winning bronze medals twice. In May 2007, the POISK's Russian team fought in the Finals and won silver at the Austrian Young Physicists' Tournament held in Leoben, Austria.

In November 2007, the POISK's team of university students was one of the two gold winners at the Ukrainian Physicists' Tournament for University Students held at the Kiev National University, Ukraine.

== See also ==
- International Young Physicists' Tournament
- Ukrainian Physicists' Tournament for University Students
- History of Young Physicists' Tournament in Russia
- Austrian Young Physicists' Tournament
