= Poisk =

Poisk may refer to:

- Poisk (computer), a Ukrainian(USSR) IBM PC XT clone (see List of Soviet computer systems)
- Poisk (ISS module), a component of the International Space Station
- POISK Centre, an educational and research organization at Saint Petersburg State University
