= Hans Peter Beck =

Swiss physicist

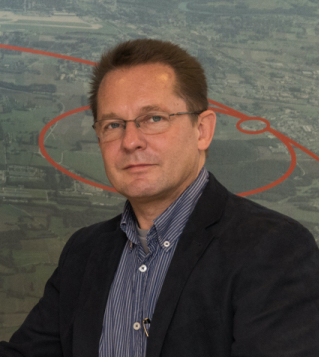
- Education: University of Zurich
- Scientific career
- Fields: Physics
- Workplaces: University of Bern; University of Fribourg; CERN
- Thesis: Measurement of the total photoproduction cross section at the electron proton collider HERA at W_{$\gamma$p} of 200 GeV (1996)
- Doctoral advisor: Peter Truöl

Hans Peter Beck (born 19 January 1965) is a Swiss experimental particle physicist and a former president of the Swiss Physical Society. Since 1997, he has served as a reader at the University of Bern and in addition, since 2014, as a titular professor at the University of Fribourg. Beck is a member of the ATLAS collaboration, one of the two major experiments at CERN that analyze particle collisions at the Large Hadron Collider (LHC), which led to the discovery of the Higgs boson in 2012.

== Professional career ==
Finishing his doctorate at University of Zurich, related to research carried out at the DESY laboratory in Hamburg, in 1996, Beck worked shortly a consultant and engineer in the private Swiss industry before taking up a position at the University of Bern. Since then Beck has been affiliated to the CERN scientific programme. In 2025 he was appointed a full member in the Swiss Academy of Engineering Sciences (SATW). Beck has co-authored more than 1500 scientific articles.

== Community engagement ==
Beck is a former chair of the International Particle Physics Outreach Group (2013 to 2019) and a former president of the Swiss Physical Society (2017 to 2021). He is the Swiss liaison to the International Union of Pure and Applied Physics and represented the Swiss Physical Society on the occasion of the opening ceremony of the International Year of Basic Sciences for Sustainable Development at UNESCO, Paris on 8 July 2022. Beck is ATLAS outreach coordinator since March 2024.

== Physics and societal impacts ==
Beck participates regularly in the public debate on matters implying physics. He co-authored, in 2021, the book "The Economics of Big Science".
