= Isabel Dorado Liñán =

Spanish ecologist, dendrochronologist, environmentalist

- Education: University of Alicante University of Barcelona
- Occupations: Scientist, Environmentalist
- Employer: Technical University of Madrid Brandenburg University of Technology Technical University of Munich

Isabel Dorado Liñán is a Spanish researcher and Doctor in Ecology. Her research focuses on forest ecology and the study of tree rings in the context of climate change.

== Education ==
Isabel Dorado graduated in biology, specializing in Environmental Biology from the University of Alicante. At this university Dorado started her doctoral thesis, in the Department of Ecology, focused on the study of tree rings. She studied the changing activity in a pine species from different locations and with different age categories, to better understand the influence of climate and aging on the formation of wood.

During the completion of her doctoral thesis, Dorado researched how ecological and climatological factors influence the formation of wood in trees in Mediterranean areas. She became particularly interested in addressing both the ecological limitations of tree growth due to global warming, as well as some known problems associated with the development of climatic reconstructions derived from tree rings in Mediterranean regions.

Dorado finished her doctoral thesis in 2011, entitled Reconstrucciones climáticas del último milenio basadas en anillos de crecimiento en la Península Ibérica: desafíos y puntos fuertes [Climate reconstructions of the last millennium based on growth rings in the Iberian Peninsula: challenges and strengths], directed by Emilia Gutiérrez Merino and Gerhard Helle, under the joint supervision of the University of Barcelona and the Helmholtz Zentrum Potsdam (Germany). It was carried out within the framework of a European project whose objective was to estimate climatic variations in Europe during the last millennium, using climatic substitutes such as tree rings.

== Career ==
As a postdoctoral student, she moved to the Technical University of Munich where she spent almost three years and later joined the Center for Forestry Research, CIFOR-INIA (Spain) to expand her knowledge and work on the impacts of global warming on the forests of temperate and boreal tree species. The results of these projects showed that forests in drought-prone areas, such as the Mediterranean basin, are at increased risk of mortality in a warmer and drier climate.

In 2018 Dorado obtained the La Caixa Young Postdoctoral Leaders Scholarship, she carried out her research titled Evaluación integrada de los futuros efectos del cambio climático en el crecimiento de los bosques de retaguardia en el Mediterráneo [Integrated Assessment of the future effects of climate change on the growth of rearguard forests in the Mediterranean] at the Polytechnic University of Madrid.

Dorado is dedicated to forest ecology, in the field of forest adaptations to climate change. Thanks to grants from la Caixa, she was able to work on modeling forests under different climate change scenarios, to really know how likely it is that some species survive and others do not, and what actions can be carried out to preserve forest cover, essential in the fight against climate change.

On the occasion of the International Day of Women and Girls in Science in 2020, Isabel Dorado and archaeologist Helena Domínguez participated in activities and interviews to narrate the challenges they faced to develop their careers as scientists. According to Dorado, forest ecology "is a world dominated fundamentally by forestry engineers, who are almost all men" and "as you advance in your research career, you can fight to change that; but gender roles still exist." In fact, she stressed that "one of the fundamental problems we face is that of invisibility: you are there, you have a very good resume, everyone tells you that you are very good, but when an opportunity comes up, the profile that is usually that of a man comes to mind." Dorado considers that even in 2020 greater professional stability is still needed in the field of scientific research.
