= Igor O. Girka =

Ukrainian astronomer

- Ігор Олександрович Гірка
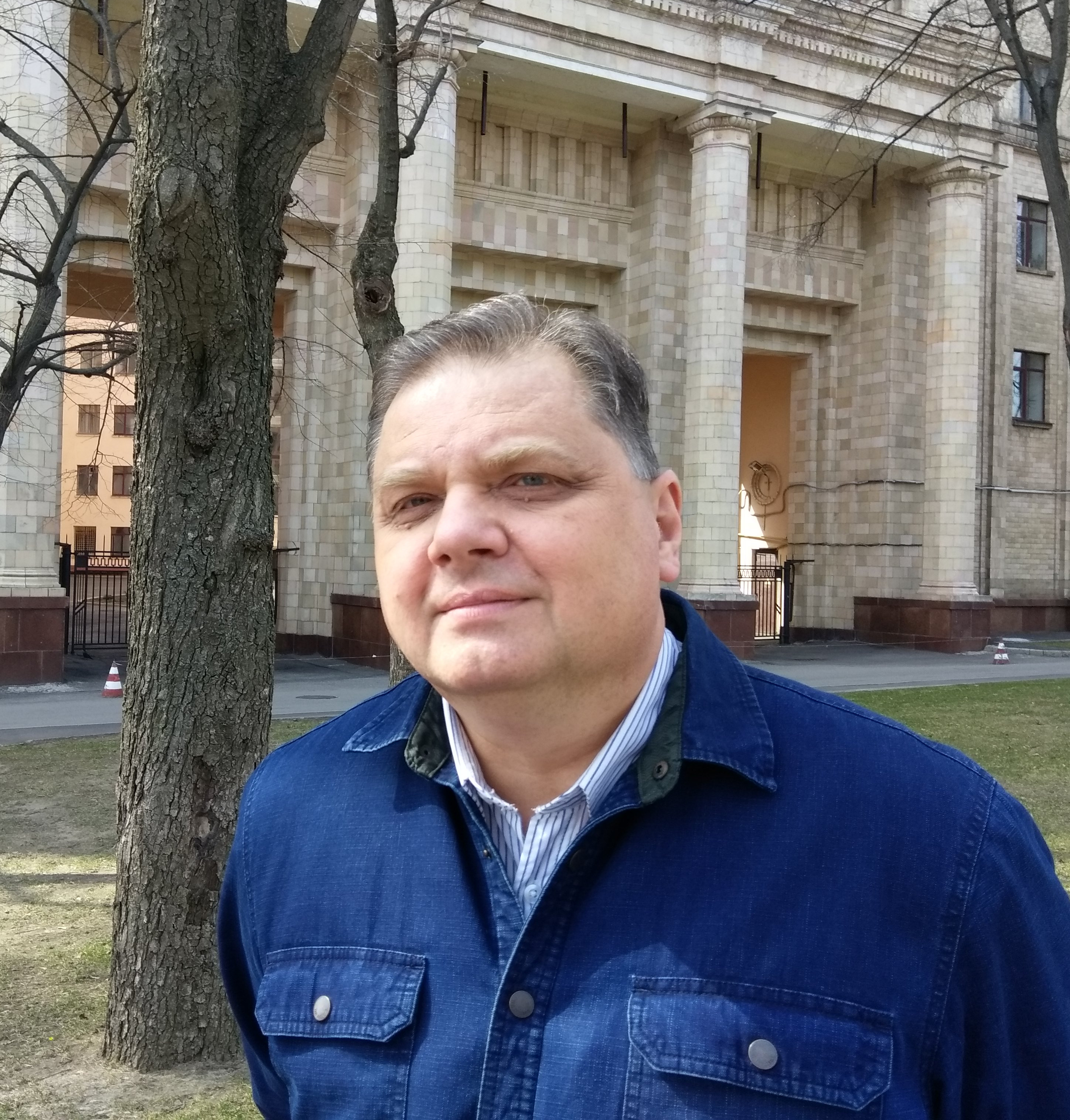
- Born: April 29, 1962 (age 64)
- Citizenship: Soviet Union; Ukraine
- Education: Kharkiv University
- Scientific career
- Fields: Physics
- Workplaces: Kharkiv University
- Doctoral advisor: Konstantin Stepanov

Igor O. Girka (born April 29, 1962) is a Ukrainian physicist and specialist in plasma physics. He is the dean of the School of Physics and Technology of Kharkiv National University (since 2005), a Corresponding Member of the National Academy of Sciences of Ukraine (since 2018), and a laureate of the K. D. Sinelnikov prize of the National Academy of Sciences of Ukraine (2010). He conducts research in plasma physics, nuclear fusion, and plasma electronics.

== Biography ==
Girka graduated from Kharkiv University in 1985, where he has been working ever since. In 1997-1999 and since 2002 he was the head of the Department of General and Applied Physics. At the same time, in 2002–2005, he served as a Vice-Rector for Education. Since 2005 he has worked as the Dean of the School of Physics and Technology.

== Research ==
Girka studied the effect of plasma corrugation and helical inhomogeneity on natural frequencies and natural modes of magnetohydrodynamic waves, as well as on Alfven plasma heating. He also explained the increase in Alfven heating in the case of a maximum on the radial density profile compared with the case of the linear profile.

== Honours and awards ==
- K. D. Sinelnikov prize of the National Academy of Sciences of Ukraine (2010)
- Winner of the regional competition "Higher School of Kharkiv Region - Best Names" in the nomination "Dean of the Faculty" (2010)
- Corresponding Member of the National Academy of Sciences of Ukraine (2018)

== Sources ==
- Гірка Ігор Олександрович // Енциклопедія сучасної України. — Київ, 2006. — Т. 5. — 10000 прим.
- Гірка Ігор Олександрович — професор Харківського національного університету імені В. Н. Каразіна. Біобібліографічний покажчик / В. О. Гірка. — Харків: ХНУ ім. В. Н. Каразіна, 2012. — 101 с.
- Biography of Igor Girka on the web page of the School of Physics and Technology.
- Girka, Igor O. in Scopus
- Igor O. Girka publications indexed by Google Scholar
