= Kostya Ostrikov =

Ukrainian-Australian physicist and academic

- Education: National University of Kharkiv
- Occupation: Physicist
- Organization: CSIRO
- Awards: Pawsey Medal; Walter Boas Medal

Kostya (Ken) Ostrikov (Ukrainian: Костянтин Миколайович Остріков) is a Ukrainian-Australian physicist and academic, professor at Queensland University of Technology and scientist at the Commonwealth Scientific and Industrial Research Organisation, member of Academia Europaea. He was awarded the Pawsey Medal (2008) and the Walter Boas Medal (2010).

== Career ==
Kostya Ostrikov graduated from the School of Physics and Technology of the University of Kharkiv in Ukraine. In 1997 he was awarded the Best Young Scientist of the Year Award of the National Academy of Sciences of Ukraine.

In 1997-2004 he worked in several different countries, as Royal Society Postdoctoral Research Fellow (United Kingdom, 1997), Alexander von Humboldt Research Fellow (Germany, 1997-1999), Japan Society for the Promotion of Science Invitation Research Fellow (Japan, 2000-2001), Long-Term Cooperation Fellow (Germany, 2002), Lee Kuan Yew Research Fellow (Nanyang Technological University, Singapore, 2002-2004).

In 2004 Kostya Ostrikov moved to Australia, where he worked as ARC Queen Elizabeth II Fellow and Associate Research Professor at the University of Sydney (2004-2009), Adjunct Professor at the University of Technology Sydney (since 2011), CEO Science Leader, ARC Future Fellow and Chief Research Scientist at the Plasma Nanoscience Center Australia at the Commonwealth Scientific and Industrial Research Organisation (2008-2015), science leader of the Office of the Chief Executive Commonwealth Scientific and Industrial Research Organisation (since 2015), professor at Queensland University of Technology (since 2015). In Australia Ostrikov was awarded several prestigious fellowships: Australian Queen Elizabeth II Fellowship of the ARC (2004-2009), CEO Science Leader Fellowship and Award at CSIRO (2008-2017), ARC Future Fellowship (2011-2015).

Simultaneously Kostya Ostrikov also works in China as Top-end Foreign Visiting Professor at Huazhong University of Science and Technology (2011-2014), Visiting Professor of "111" Project at Zhejiang University (since 2015), Visiting Foreign Professor at Peking University (since 2015).

== Awards and honors ==
- Honorary Professor at the University of Sydney (2008)
- The Pawsey Medal (2008)
- Distinguished Doctor of Sciences at Kharkiv National University, Ukraine (2009)
- The Walter Boas Medal (2010)
- Honorary Professor at the University of Wollongong (2011)
