= Jean-Philippe Ansermet =

Swiss physicist

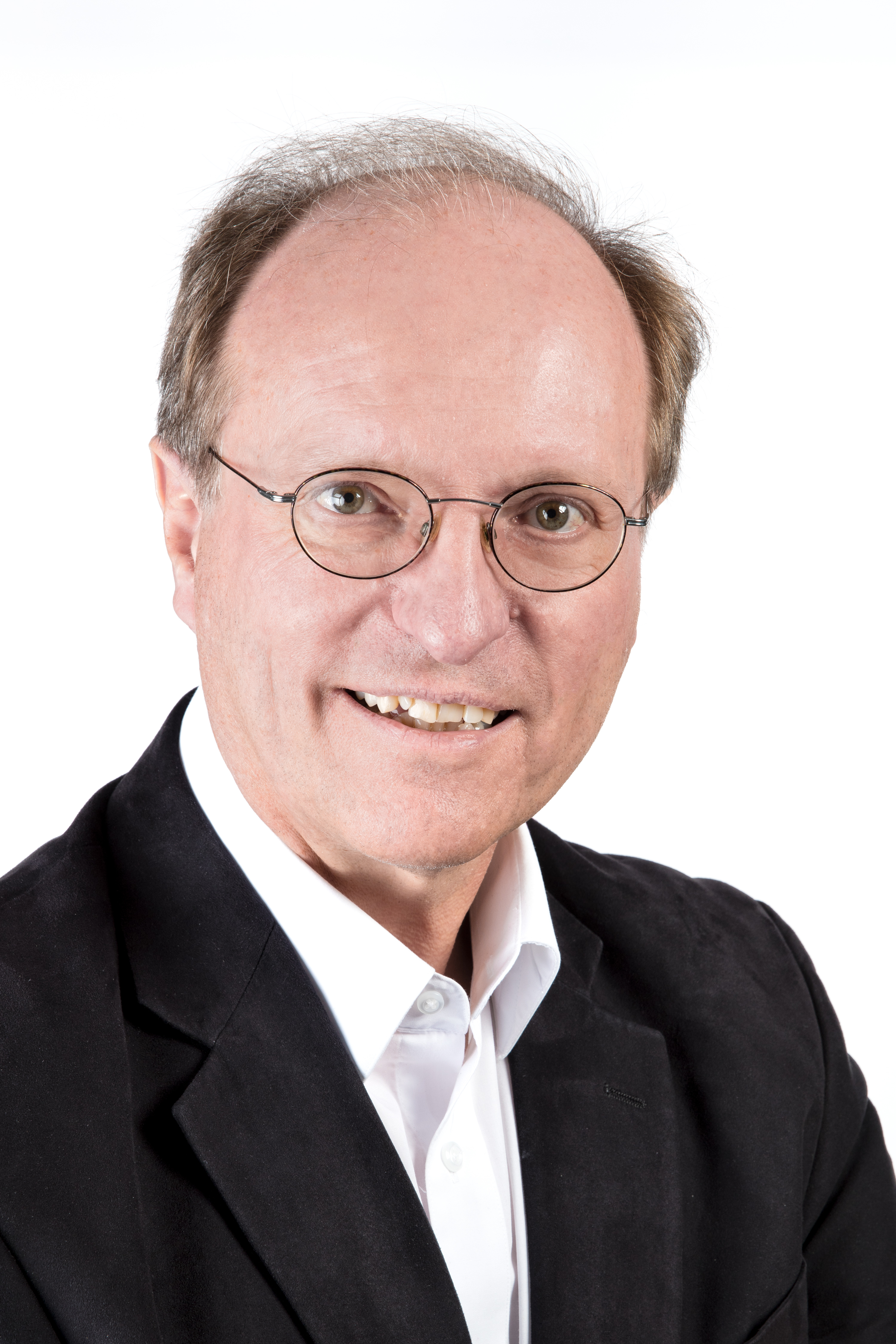
- Jean-Philippe Ansermet in 2021
- Born: March 1, 1957 (age 69); Lausanne, Switzerland
- Education: École Polytechnique Fédérale de Lausanne (BSc & MSc); University of Illinois at Urbana-Champaign (PhD)
- Scientific career
- Fields: Spintronics, nuclear magnetic resonance
- Institutions: École Polytechnique Fédérale de Lausanne (EPFL)
- Thesis: A New Approach to the Study of Surface Phenomena: Measurements of Diffusion Rates, Intermolecular Distances and Electronic Properties of Carbon Monoxide Chemisorbed on Supported Platinum Catalysts by Nuclear Magnetic Resonance (1985)
- Website: https://www.epfl.ch/labs/lpmn/

Jean-Philippe Ansermet (French: [ɑ̃.sɛʁ.mɛ]; born March 1, 1957) is a Swiss physicist and engineer and a professor at École Polytechnique Fédérale de Lausanne. His research focuses on the fabrication and properties of nanostructured materials as well as spintronics.

== Career ==
Jean-Philippe Ansermet graduated from École Polytechnique Fédérale de Lausanne with a degree in physics in 1980. He then pursued a PhD at the University of Illinois at Urbana-Champaign, developing NMR spectroscopy for catalysis research and defending his thesis in 1985. He then continued his research on surface NMR as a postdoc at the same institution until 1987, when he was named group leader for the Swiss chemical company Ciba-Geigy, working on composite materials and charge-transfer salts. In 1992, he was named professor of experimental physics at EPFL, where he was promoted to full professor in 1995 and named head of the physics section in 2007. There, he teaches classical mechanics as well as thermodynamics to undergraduate and graduate students.

He was a member of the executive committee of the European Physical Society from 1993 to 1998, and the president of the Swiss Physical Society from 2002 to 2006.

== Research ==
Ansermet heads the Laboratory of the Physics of Nanostructured Materials at the Institute of Physics of EPFL. Research in his lab focuses on spintronics and novel magnetic resonance methods, including sub-THz instrumentation.

The laboratory of Ansermet characterized giant magnetoresistance with current driven perpendicular to the interfaces of Co/Cu multilayers before large collaborations could achieve the same through lithography. It also participated in the discovery that a current can flip the magnetization of a nanostructure via the spin-transfer torque. The lab demonstrated the concept of a heat-driven spin torque in ferromagnetic metals. Using thermodynamics, the laboratory also predicted and demonstrated a heat-driven spin torque in insulating ferromagnet.

The laboratory of Ansermet studies Dynamic Nuclear Polarization (DNP) as a way to enhance signals in surface-NMR experiments, requiring excitation in the sub-THz domain. This constraint led to the development of DNP instruments by the LPMN and its collaborators and the creation the Swiss start-up Swissto12. Collaboration between the Swiss Plasma Center at EPFL and the LPMN led to the construction of a gyrotron. The laboratory further showed that this equipment can induce resonance in antiferromagnets, thus expanding the field of spintronics.

== Distinctions ==
- Secretary of the European Physical Society (1993-1998)
- President of the Swiss Physical Society (2002-2006)
- Fellow of the American Physical Society (2011)

== Selected publications ==
=== Books ===
- Ansermet, Jean-Philippe (2013). Mécanique. Presses polytechniques et universitaires romandes. ISBN 978-2-88915-024-3.
- Ansermet, Jean-Philippe; Brechet, Sylvain D. (2018). Principles of Thermodynamics. doi:10.1017/9781108620932. ISBN 978-1-108-62093-2. S2CID 105299097.

=== Articles ===
==== Spintronics ====
- Blondel, A.; Meier, J. P.; Doudin, B.; Ansermet, J.‐Ph. (1994). "Giant magnetoresistance of nanowires of multilayers". Applied Physics Letters. 65 (23): 3019–3021. Bibcode:1994ApPhL..65.3019B. doi:10.1063/1.112495.
- Wegrowe, J.-E; Kelly, D.; Jaccard, Y.; Guittienne, Ph; Ansermet, J.-Ph (1999). "Current-induced magnetization reversal in magnetic nanowires" (PDF). EPL. 45 (5): 626–632. Bibcode:1999EL.....45..626W. doi:10.1209/epl/i1999-00213-1. S2CID 250859071.
- Yu, Haiming; Granville, S.; Yu, D. P.; Ansermet, J.-Ph. (2010). "Evidence for Thermal Spin-Transfer Torque". Physical Review Letters. 104 (14) 146601. arXiv:1003.3042. Bibcode:2010PhRvL.104n6601Y. doi:10.1103/PhysRevLett.104.146601. PMID 20481950. S2CID 15412728.
- Brechet, Sylvain D.; Vetro, Francesco A.; Papa, Elisa; Barnes, Stewart E.; Ansermet, Jean-Philippe (2013). "Evidence for a Magnetic Seebeck Effect". Physical Review Letters. 111 (8) 087205. arXiv:1306.1001. Bibcode:2013PhRvL.111h7205B. doi:10.1103/PhysRevLett.111.087205. PMID 24010472. S2CID 14013887.

==== Nuclear magnetic resonance ====
- Wang, P.-K.; Ansermet, J.-P.; Rudaz, S. L.; Wang, Z.; Shore, S.; Slichter, C. P.; Sinfelt, J. H. (1986). "NMR Studies of Simple Molecules on Metal Surfaces". Science. 234 (4772): 35–41. Bibcode:1986Sci...234...35W. doi:10.1126/science.234.4772.35. PMID 17742632. S2CID 30487098.
- Ansermet, J.-Ph.; Slichter, C.P.; Sinfelt, J.H. (1990). "Solid state NMR techniques for the study of surface phenomena". Progress in Nuclear Magnetic Resonance Spectroscopy. 22 (5): 401–421. doi:10.1016/0079-6565(90)80005-3.
- Day, James B.; Vuissoz, Pierre-Andre; Oldfield, Eric; Wieckowski, Andrzej; Ansermet, Jean-Philippe (1996). "Nuclear Magnetic Resonance Spectroscopic Study of the Electrochemical Oxidation Product of Methanol on Platinum Black". Journal of the American Chemical Society. 118 (51): 13046–13050. doi:10.1021/ja962490u.
- Alberti, S.; Braunmueller, F.; Tran, T. M.; Genoud, J.; Hogge, J-Ph.; Tran, M. Q.; Ansermet, J-Ph. (2013). "Nanosecond Pulses in a THZ Gyrotron Oscillator Operating in a Mode-Locked Self-ConsistentQ-Switch Regime". Physical Review Letters. 111 (20) 205101. Bibcode:2013PhRvL.111t5101A. doi:10.1103/PhysRevLett.111.205101. PMID 24289692.
