= IYPT 2011 =

International Young Physicists' Tournament 2011
- Host: Ariaian Young Innovative Minds Institute, AYIMI as head of Local Organizing Committee held the 24th IYPT with cooperation of Amirkabir University of Technology, Tehran, Iran
- Nations: 21 (Brazil, Thailand, Ukraine returning)
- Debuting countries: none
- Dates: 22–31 July 2011
- Website: www.iypt.ir
- Finalists: South Korea; Austria; Germany
- Winner: South Korea
- Winning problem: 7. Cup drum

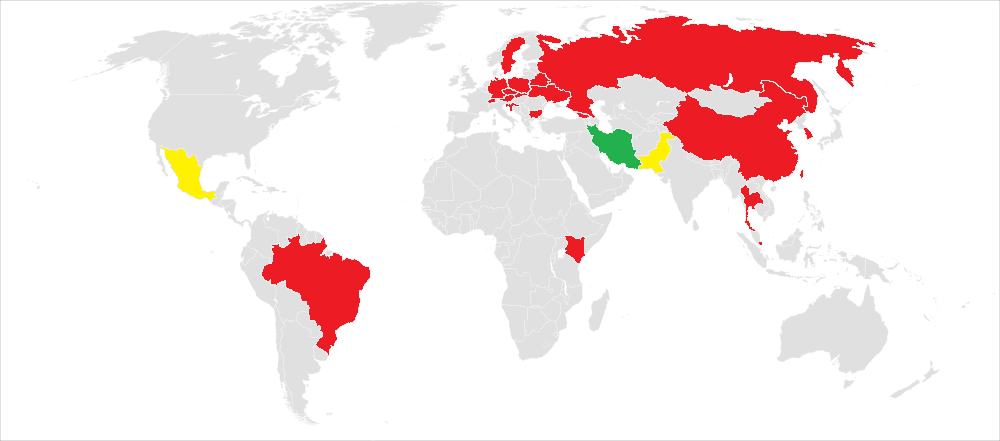
Participating countries Host country Observing countries

The International Young Physicists' Tournament 2011 was the 24th edition of the International Young Physicists' Tournament and was hosted by Ariaian Young Innovative Minds Institute, AYIMI, in Iran (Persian: مؤسسه اندیشه های خلاق جوان آریایی Moasese Andisheha-ye Khalagh-e Javan-e Ariyaee). It took place between 22 and 31 July 2012 in Tehran, Iran, with cooperation of the Amirkabir University of Technology (Persian: دانشگاه صنعتی امیرکبیر Dāneshgāh-e San'ati-ye Amirkabir).

The tournament was won by National team of South Korea with 51,3 in the final. The other finalists, Austria and Germany, received gold medals.

== Changes in rules ==
- The new scoring procedure was accepted on the EC Meeting in 2010. "Scoring guidelines" were drafted before the tournament in Tehran especially to standardize the marks of jury in all rooms during selective fights.
- It was suggested in the EC Meeting in November 2009 to increase number of rejected problems from three to five, but EC members did not support the idea. However, EC suggests changing the procedure of PFs in the following way:

The first four PFs run as usual. In the fifth PF, teams from the first three, second three, third three etc. positions meet. In this PF, every team can choose a problem for presentation, as long as it was not presented by that team during the previous PFs. The same problem can not be presented in final, neither. The priority of selection is given by the position in scoring after four rounds. Points from the fifth PF will be summed up with the points from the four initial PF as usual.

This procedure could lead to two basic things: firstly, all teams will have an opportunity to present their best solution, even if they do not reach the final. Secondly, the neighboring teams from the scoring list after four rounds will meet and have the opportunity to fight against each other, discussing the solutions with other teams on the same/similar level. Especially in the first and second group the competition for the final and in the second and third group the competition for the silver medals will be more direct and more interesting for the students. Such a change of regulation has to be discussed in the IOC and can be applied later.

== Problems ==
The International Organizing Committee (IOC) decides about 17 problems to be used for the IYPT 2011 in the IOC Meeting in July 2010 after the previous tournament.

#	Title of the problem
1	Adhesive tape
2	Air drying
3	Bouncing flame
4	Breaking spaghetti
5	Car
6	Convection
7	Cup drum
8	Domino amplifier
9	Escaping powder
10	Faraday heaping
11	Fingerprints
12	Levitating spinner
13	Light bulb
14	Moving cylinder
15	Slow descent
16	Smoke stream
17	Vikings

== Venue ==
The host country of the IYPT 2011 was discussed for 3 years. Australia, Indonesia and Iran placed their bids for the Tournament-2011. The executive committee (EC) voted to decide which candidate should host the tournament in July 2010. Tehran was chosen to host the IYPT 2011 by a majority votes.

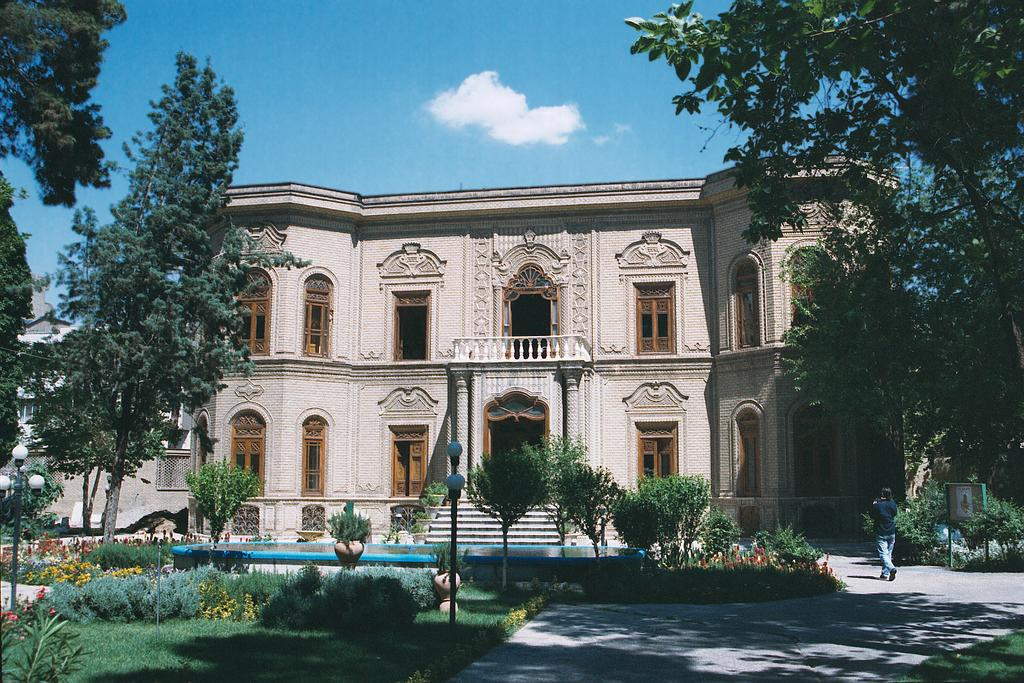
Museum of ceramics

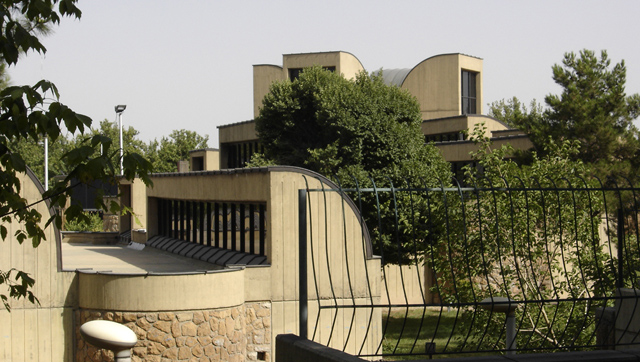
Tehran Museum of Contemporary Art

== Participants ==
In May 2011, the Local Organizing Committee (LOC) confirmed that national teams from 21 countries would be present in the IYPT 2011.

Europe	Asia
Austria; Belarus; Bulgaria; Croatia; Czech Republic; Germany; Poland; Russian Federation; Slovakia; Sweden; Switzerland; Ukraine	China; Taiwan; Georgia; Iran; Singapore; South Korea; Thailand
Africa	South America
Kenya	Brazil

== Selective fights ==
Five selective fights occurred between 23 and 26 July 2011. The top 3 teams were qualified for the final: South Korea, Austria, Germany. The following 9 national teams received silver and bronze medals.

=== Total Scores ===
#	Team	Score
1	South Korea	230.2
2	Austria	208.2
3	Germany	204.7
4	Taiwan	203.1
5	Iran	202.8
6	Slovakia	201.78
7	Singapore	198.53
8	Belarus	197.83
9	Sweden	191.82
10	Poland	190.58
11	Croatia	186.1
12	Georgia	185.53
13	Czech Republic	183
14	Bulgaria	177.3
15	Brazil	175.55
16	Switzerland	174.68
17	China	172.05
18	Russia	168.3
19	Thailand	164.09
20	Kenya	135.99
21	Ukraine	135.7

== Final ==
#	Team	Score
1	South Korea	51.3
2	Austria	46.2
3	Germany	45.35

== Results ==
Winner	Gold medal	Silver medal	Bronze medal
South Korea	Austria, Germany	Taiwan, Iran, Slovakia, Singapore, Belarus	Sweden, Poland, Croatia

== See also ==
- Austrian Young Physicists' Tournament
- International Young Physicists' Tournament
