= Verena Meyer =

Swiss physicist (1929–2018)

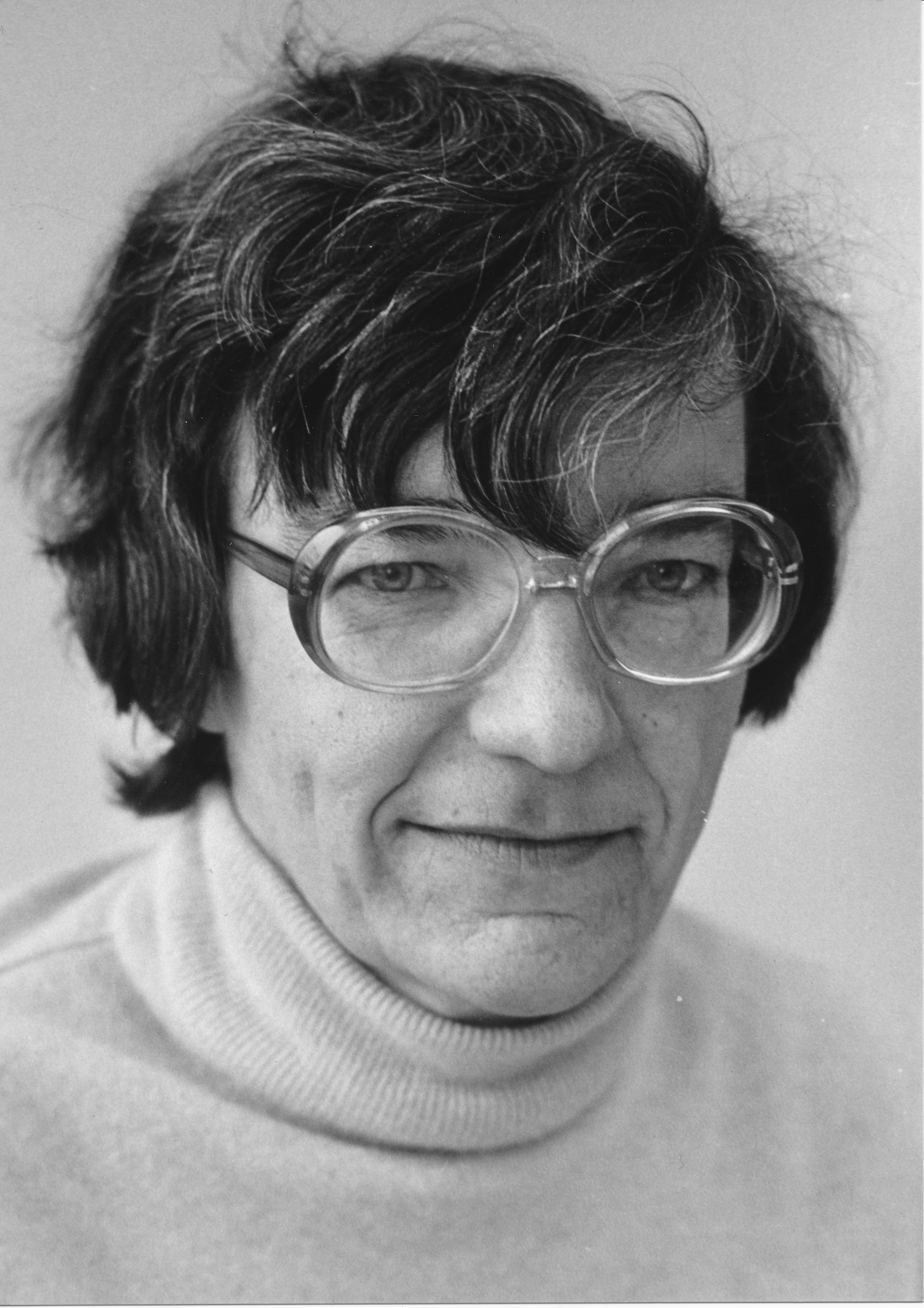
- Born: 4 June 1929
- Died: 21 July 2018 (aged 89)
- Education: University of Zurich; University of Minnesota
- Scientific career
- Fields: Experimental Nuclear Physics
- Institutions: University of Zurich
- Thesis: Angeregte Zustände des Beryllium 8 Kerns
- Academic advisors: Hans H. Staub

Verena Meyer (4 June 1929 – 21 July 2018) was a Swiss nuclear physicist and former President of the University of Zurich. She was the first woman elected to serve as president of the Swiss Physical Society.

== Early life ==
Meyer was born to academic parents in 1929. Her father, Karl Meyer, was a professor of history at the University of Zurich and her mother, Alice Meyer, was a lawyer. Her father died when she was 20 years old.

== Career ==
She originally entered medical school, but eventually switch to physics at the University of Zurich. She was influenced to make the change due to nuclear physicist Hans H. Staub.

After conducting her postdoctorate at the University of Minnesota, she returned to the University of Zurich as a professor. Her work in Minnesota, which was a collaborative project with the University of Zurich, focused on the construction of a particle accelerator. She began her career at the University of Zurich as a lecturer before being promoted to full professor. She served in various roles until her retirement in 1994, such as Dean of the Philosophical Faculty II and Vice-President of Research.

She was the first woman elected to serve as president of the Swiss Physical Society, which she held from 1975 until 1979. In 1976, Meyer was appointed dean of the Faculty of Science, become the first woman told hold such a position. She went on to serve as President of the university from 1982 to 1984. During the same year she was promoted to Dean, the Faculty of Law and Political Science also promoted another female, Heidi Schelbert, to the same position. Meyer stated she felt there was a competition between the department to bring prestige to the university. She later sat as President of the Swiss Science Council from 1987 to 2000. She also was a member of the Energy Research Commission for the federal government.

She died on 21 July 2018.
