= International Day of Women and Girls in Science =

Annual observance

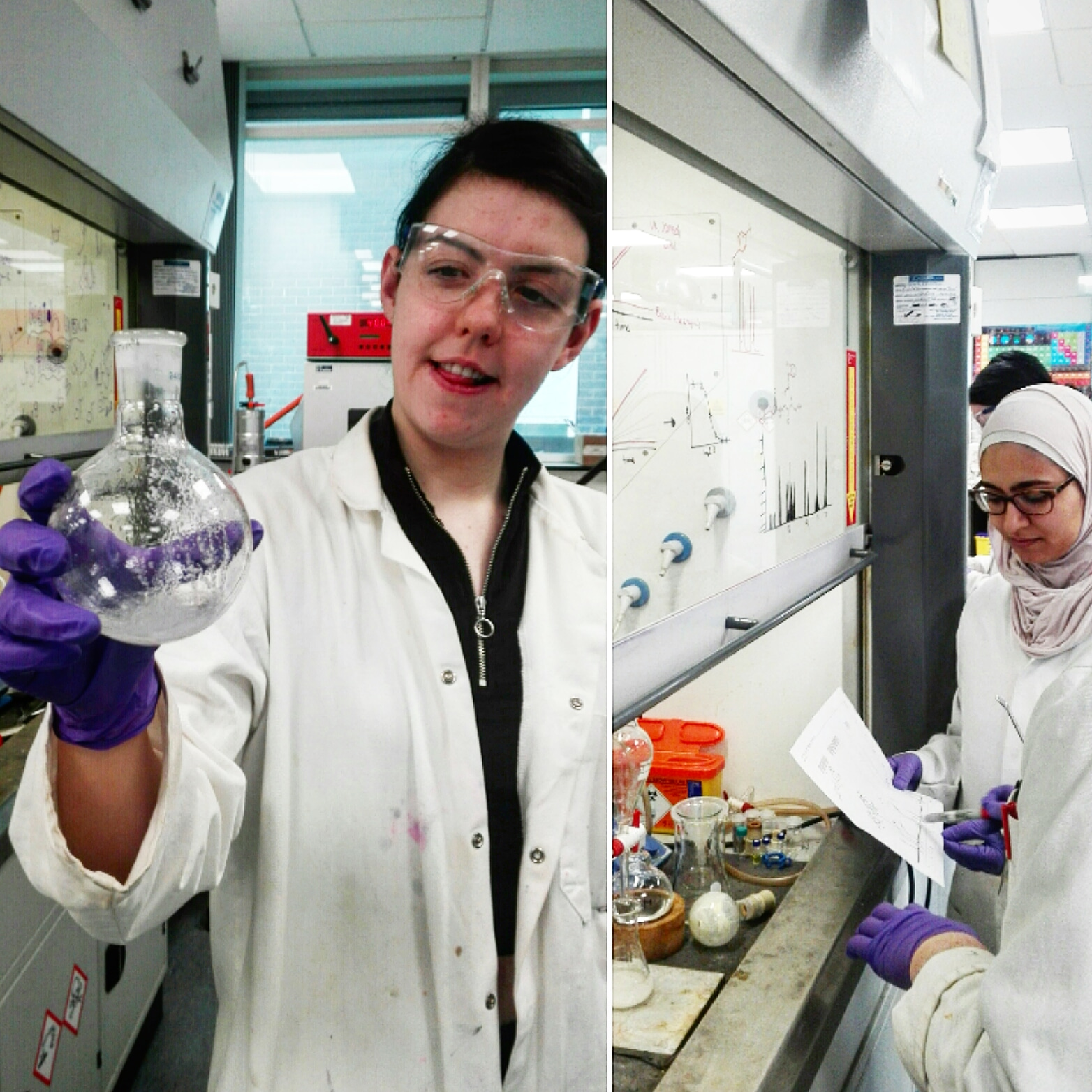
- Female PhD and Masters students conduct experiments in a Chemistry laboratory (2018)
- Observed by: Worldwide
- Type: International
- Date: February 11
- Next time: February 11, 2027
- Frequency: Annual

The International Day of Women and Girls in Science is an annual observance adopted by the United Nations General Assembly to promote equal participation of women in Science, Technology, Engineering and Mathematics (STEM) fields. The United Nations General Assembly passed the resolution in 2015, which proclaimed 11 February as the commemoration of the observance. A theme is selected annually as a focus point for gender equality in science.

The International Day of Women and Girls in Science is implemented annually at the United Nations Headquarters by the Royal Academy of Science International Trust in partnership with UNESCO and UNWomen. to promote the role of women and girls in scientific fields and celebrate those who have been successful in the field.

== Background ==
=== Context ===
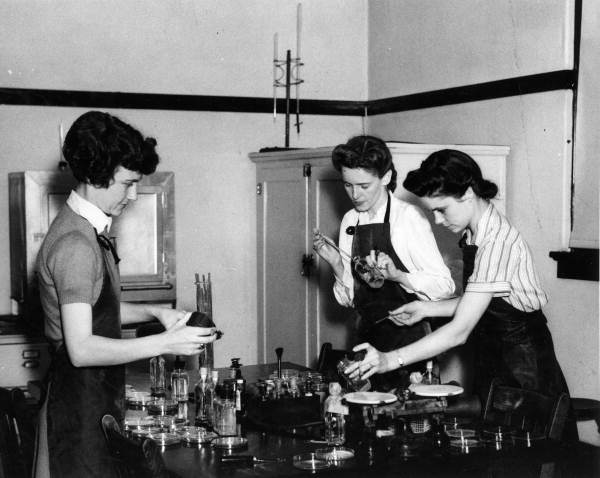
Florida State College for Women students experimenting in the chemical lab in Tallahassee, Florida (ca. 1940)

In comparison to their male peers, females are underrepresented in science and technology fields. Between the 1960s and 1980s, the number of women obtaining science and engineering degrees steadily increased in American universities, however reached an unexpected plateau from the 1980s. A 2013 UK study explored that there has existed a persistent underrepresentation of women in STEM fields, and that in the prior 25-year period there had been little change of the participation of women in science and technology. Further, social barriers including the expectation of women in the home, early marriage and discriminatory practices in the labour market have been persistent in preventing women in developing regions across the world such as Africa, South Asia and the Caribbean from not only pursuing science and technology further, but education more broadly.

In the present day these barriers to participation are still persistent, and present as social barriers. A 2013 study in the United Kingdom explored the social barriers to participation post the compulsory participation age in sciences (particularly physics) and determined that pervasive gender biases exist, with girls less likely to be encouraged to study physics by their teachers, family, and friends.

Throughout the world there are also regional differences in the particular barriers for female participation in the sciences. In the United States, it was found that lower enrolment and attraction to scientific education across the pipeline resulted in lower female participation. This differed to the Arab world, where enrolment in scientific education is particularly high, comprising a sixty to eighty percent share of total enrolments, however career and social barriers prevented further participation.

=== Adoption by the United Nations ===
Logo of the United Nations

Initiated by the Royal Academy of Science International Trust (RASIT) facilitated by the Government of Malta, and sponsored by more than 60 countries, the 70th Session of the United Nations General Assembly adopted resolution 70/212 titled "International Day of Women and Girls in Science" on 22 December 2015. This resolution formally proclaimed February 11 as the annual observation of the International Day of Women and Girls in Science. The United Nations General Assembly invited all member states, organizations and bodies of the United Nations alongside individuals and the private sector to engage in awareness raising and educational activities to promote the full and equal access for women and girls in science. In adopting the resolution, the United Nations drew on several of its previous resolutions in order to cite the need for the observation of the International Day of Women and Girls in Science. Notably, resolution 70/1 titled "Transforming our world: the 2030 Agenda for Sustainable Development", which declared the United Nations' 2030 Sustainable Development Goals, was cited, namely the goals of quality education and gender equality. Alongside this, resolution 68/220 was cited, where the United Nations General Assembly recognized that in order to achieve gender equality and female empowerment, it is essential to promote the full and equal access of females to participate in science, technology and innovation. The Royal Academy of Science International Trust, the Government of Malta, and the Permanent Missions to the United Nations are responsible for commemorating the International Day of Women and Girls in Science.

== Annual commemorations and official themes ==
Following the adoption of Resolution A/RES/70/212 on the International Day of Women and Girls in Science, The Royal Academy of Science International Trust (RASIT) continues to work with UN Member States, Inter-Governmental Organizations, the UN and its entities to achieve equality in science, technology, and innovation for socio-economic sustainable development in line with the 2030 Agenda and its SDGs.

Following the adoption of UNGA Resolution 70/212, RASIT reached out to UNESCO and UN Women on January 4, 2016 to discuss its vision for the inaugural International Day of Women and Girls in Science. On January 7, UNESCO, accompanied by UN Women invited RASIT to lead celebration planning.

Each year on February 11, RASIT in close collaboration and partnership with the United Nations Member States, Departments, organizations and entities, as well as Intergovernmental Organizations organizes the International Day of Women and Girls in Science Assembly at the United Nations Headquarters in New York. The High-Level Assembly brings together representatives of member states and international organizations, the private sector and leading scientists to discuss measures and initiatives to promote the increased participation of females in STEM.

Each year the assembly focuses upon a key theme as a central topic of discussion.

In a shift from traditional international observances initiated by the United Nations, RASIT established a new tradition to incorporate themes for the International Day of Women and Girls in Science directly from the voices of women in science. This approach is intended to highlight contributions of women as leaders in science and elevate their voices.

Events held in connection with International Day of Women and Girls in Science have involved participation from Member States, UN Departments and Entities, and IGOs, and have produced outcome documents and declarations endorsed by participating bodies. Furthermore, the February 11 annual Assembly is the first to be moderated by Girls in Science and includes the voices of the blind and deaf women in science.

Another aim is to bridge the International Community and women in science and experts by linking their knowledge and expertise and its applications for the 2030 agenda and its 17 global goals, as well as assisting policymakers.

The annual commemoration now includes over 155,000 events and projects that demonstrate the commitment of girls, women, and supportive men .

Annual themes of the International Day of Women and Girls in Science
| Edition | Year | Theme |
|---|---|---|
| 1st | 2016 | Transforming the World: Parity in Science |
| 2nd | 2017 | Gender, Science and Sustainable Development: The Impact of Media – From Vision to Action |
| 3rd | 2018 | Equality and Parity in Science for Peace and Development |
| 4th | 2019 | Investment in Women and Girls in Science for Inclusive Green Growth |
| 5th | 2020 | Equality in Science, Technology and Innovation: Global Trends and Challenges |
| 6th | 2021 | Beyond the Borders: Equality in Science for Society |
| 7th | 2022 | Equity, Diversity, and Inclusion: Water Unites Us |
| 8th | 2023 | Innovate. Demonstrate. Elevate. Advance. Sustain. IDEAS: Bringing Everyone Forward for Sustainable and Equitable Development. |
| 9th | 2024 | Women in Science Leadership: a New Era for Sustainability |
| 10th | 2025 | Charting Progress to Shape the Future: The Best is Yet to Come |
| 11th | 2026 | Science for Inclusive Futures for Women and Girls |

== Recognition by government organizations ==
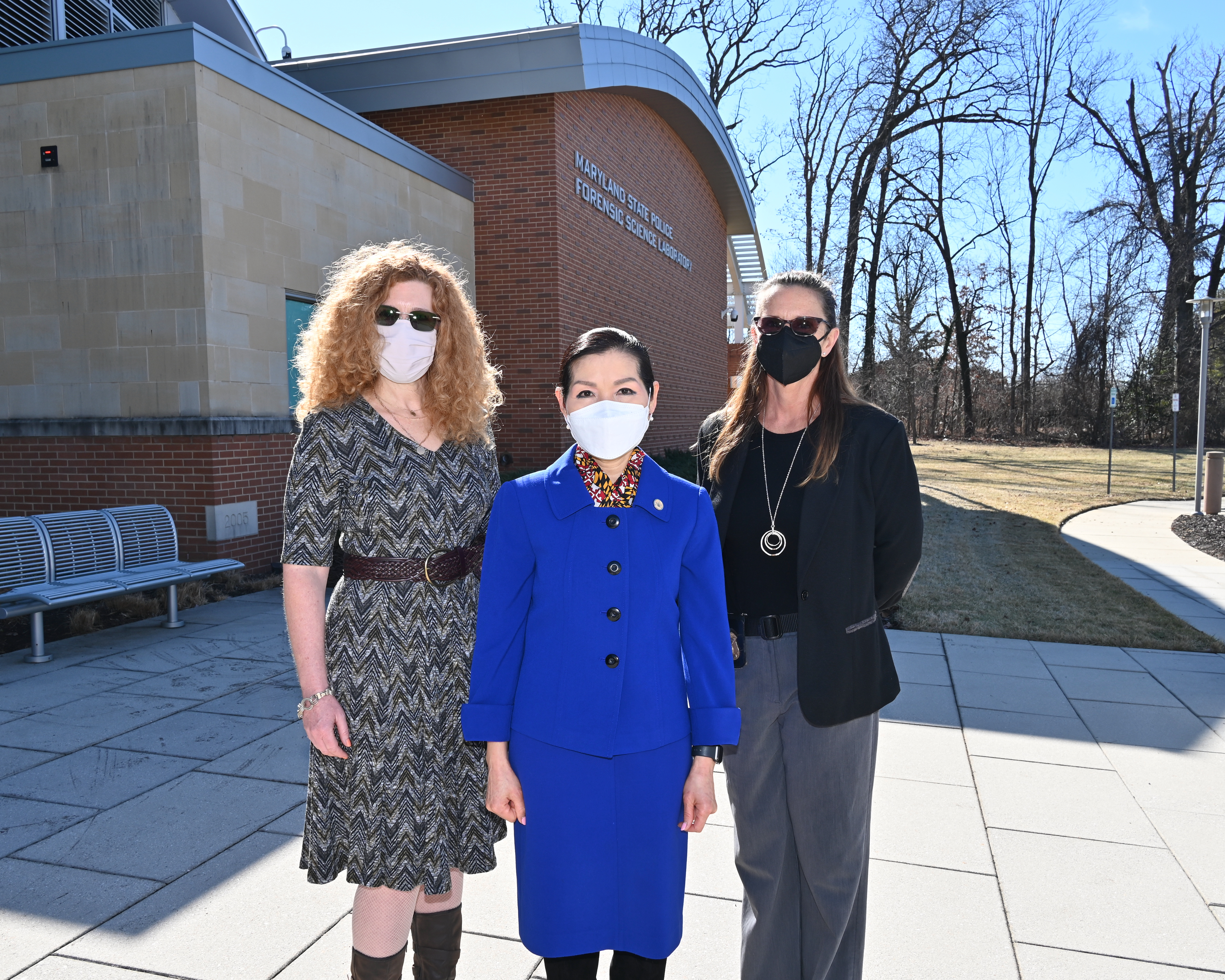
First Lady of Maryland, Yumi Hogan supports the 2022 International Day of Women and Girls in Science at the Maryland State Police Forensic Sciences Division

Alongside the annual assembly of the United Nations, various governments and governmental organizations promote initiatives to recognize and endorse the International Day of Women and Girls in Science, including raising awareness and increasing funding to initiatives promoting women in science. Selected examples have been highlighted below.

=== Australia ===
As a permanent sponsor mission, the Australian Government has actively taken steps to promote and encourage female participation in alignment with the recognition and celebration of the International Day of Women and Girls in Science. To commemorate the event in 2022, the Australian Government Department of Industry, Science, Energy and Resources committed A$6.7 million of funding to address female under-representation in STEM fields by expanding successful initiatives targeting the issue.

=== European Union ===
The executive branch of the European Union, the European Commission, has specifically called upon its citizens to acknowledge the achievements of female participation in scientific research and innovation on the International Day of Women and Girls in Science. The European Union has actively implemented initiatives to promote women and girls in science, such as requiring organizations to have a Gender Equality Plan in place to be eligible to receive Horizon Europe funding and grants as well as awarding three EUR 50,000 grants in 2022 to female innovators under 35.

=== Ireland ===
The Irish Government actively recognizes the International Day of Women and Girls in Science and has used the commemoration to announce reforms to recognize and promote the need for increased female participation in STEM. On recognition of the 7th annual observation of the event, the Irish Minister for Further and Higher Education, Research, Innovation and Science, Simon Harris, announced that the three largest providers of scientific funding in Ireland require Higher Education institutions to have gender equality accreditation before they have access to research funding.

=== Kenya ===
The Government of the Republic of Kenya, specifically the Ministry of Education and National Commission for Science, Technology and Innovation have actively celebrated the International Day of Women and Girls in Science. In 2022, the organizations alongside the UNESCO Kenya National Mission hosted a virtual celebration to celebrate the 2022 theme involving speakers and educational aspects.

=== United Kingdom ===
The Government of the United Kingdom is an active supporter of the International Day of Women and Girls, and actively promotes it through its Government agencies. Notably, the United Kingdom's Foreign, Commonwealth and Development Office actively promoted and stated the United Kingdom's commitment to supporting women and girls in STEM through its social media channels for the 2022 commemoration and through interviews with leading British female scientists in 2021.

== Other recognition ==
Globally, non-government and corporate organizations have also recognized the International Day of Women and Girls in Science through their own initiatives to promote the role of females in STEM. Selected examples have been highlighted below.

=== Universities and academia ===
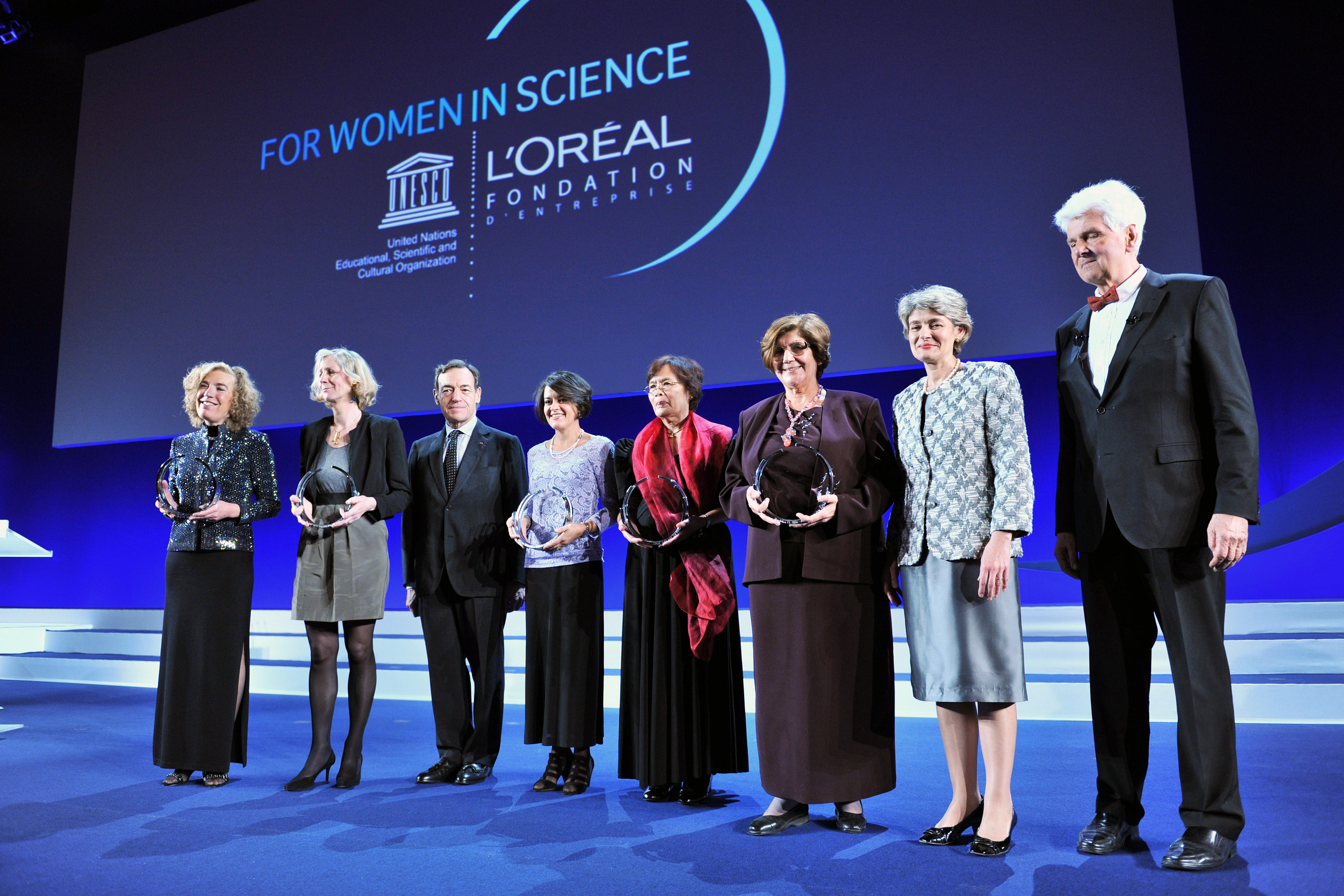
L'Oréal Prize for Women in Science Awards Ceremony (2010)

Universities and academic organizations play a key role in the recognition of the International Day of Women and Girls in Science. For example, in 2017 for the 2nd annual commemoration of the event, the International Particle Physics Outreach Group, a network of academics and scientists from universities and research laboratories around the globe, launched masterclasses ran by female scientists for female students across Barcelona, Cagliari, Cosenza, Heidelberg, Madrid, Paris, Prague, Rio de Janeiro and São Paulo. After their launch these masterclasses have continued to run annually alongside the International Day of Women and Girls in Science. Associated members of the International Science Council including the International Astronomical Union, International Mathematical Union and International Union of Pure and Applied Chemistry all host events both in person and virtually on an annual basis to celebrate the International Day of Women and Girls in Science.

=== Corporations ===
Various corporations actively participate in initiatives to promote women and girls in science that coincide with the commemoration of the International Day of Women and Girls in Science. L'Oreal sponsors the L'Oreal-UNESCO For Women in Science Awards which are presented annually on 11 February to five female scientists from regions across the globe to recognize esteemed accomplishment in scientific fields. Airbus, a global aviation company, utilises the focus of the International Day of Women and Girls in Science to highlight important women in their company and the key roles they play for the firm globally. In 2022, they highlighted the role of the first female to join Airbus' space programme manager's group in Madrid.
