= Teresa Montaruli =

Italian astronomer

- Born: 1968 (age 57–58)
- Education: -University of Bari, University of Wisconsin Madison, University of Bologna
- Known for: IceCube, Cherenkov Telescope Array, HAWC High Altitude Water Cherenkov experiment, WIYN Optical telescope, VERITAS and FACT gamma-ray telescopes associate member, NASA Glast Investigator
- Children: Two twins
- Awards: Duggal Award American Physics Society Fellow Honorary Fellow of the University of Wisconsin - Madison
- Scientific career
- Fields: Cosmic rays, Neutrinos, Gamma-rays, photosensors
- Workplaces: Université de Genève
- Website: https://www.unige.ch/dpnc/en/members/actual-members/m/teresa-montaruli/

Teresa Montaruli (born 1968) is an Italian astronomer specializing in neutrino astronomy, and in particular in the search for high-energy neutrinos from cosmic sources. She is a professor in the particle physics department at the University of Geneva.

== Education and career ==
Montaruli is originally from Livorno in Italy, where she was born on 4 October 1968. She earned a laurea in physics at the University of Bari in 1993, a diploma from the University of Bologna in 1994, and a Ph.D. from the University of Bari in 1998. Her dissertation, Atmospheric neutrino flux and search for astrophysical neutrinos: Measurement with MACRO at Gran Sasso, was jointly supervised by C. De Marzo, Francesco Ronga, and Giuseppe Battistoni.

She remained at Bari as a research associate and assistant professor before going on leave in 2005 to visit the University of Wisconsin–Madison, where she became an assistant professor in 2006, an associate professor in 2007, and a full professor in 2010. In 2011 she took her present position at the University of Geneva.

== Membership in Scientific Bodies/Juries ==
- 2010 Decadal Survey of the United States National Academy
- Member of ApPEC General Assembly
- Executive Board of the Swiss Professors association CHIPP
- Member of the Scientific Advisory Committee of Laboratori Nazionali del Gran Sasso

== Research collaborations ==
Montaruli's earliest research was part of the MACRO experiment at the Laboratori Nazionali del Gran Sasso. She has also worked with the ANTARES neutrino detector in the Mediterranean Sea near Toulon, France, and the High Altitude Water Cherenkov Experiment on Sierra Negra in Mexico.

Montaruli is a participant in the IceCube Neutrino Observatory, the Cherenkov Telescope Array, and the Large High Altitude Air Shower Observatory. She has chaired the Astroparticle Physics European Coordination/Consortium, a predecessor to the Aspera European Astroparticle network.

== Recognition ==
In 2001, Montaruli won the Shakti P. Duggal Award of the Commission on Cosmic Rays of the International Union of Pure and Applied Physics, for "significant contributions to cosmic-ray physics by a young scientist of outstanding ability". In 2009 she was named a Fellow of the American Physical Society (APS), after a nomination from the APS Division of Astrophysics, "for fundamental contributions, both experimental and theoretical, to the understanding of cosmic and atmospheric neutrino fluxes, neutrino mass, and the spectra of dark matter annihilations".
