= University of Kyiv Faculty of Radio Physics, Electronics and Computer Systems =

Coordinates: 50°22′57″N 30°28′15″E

Faculty of Radio Physics, Electronics and Computer Systems
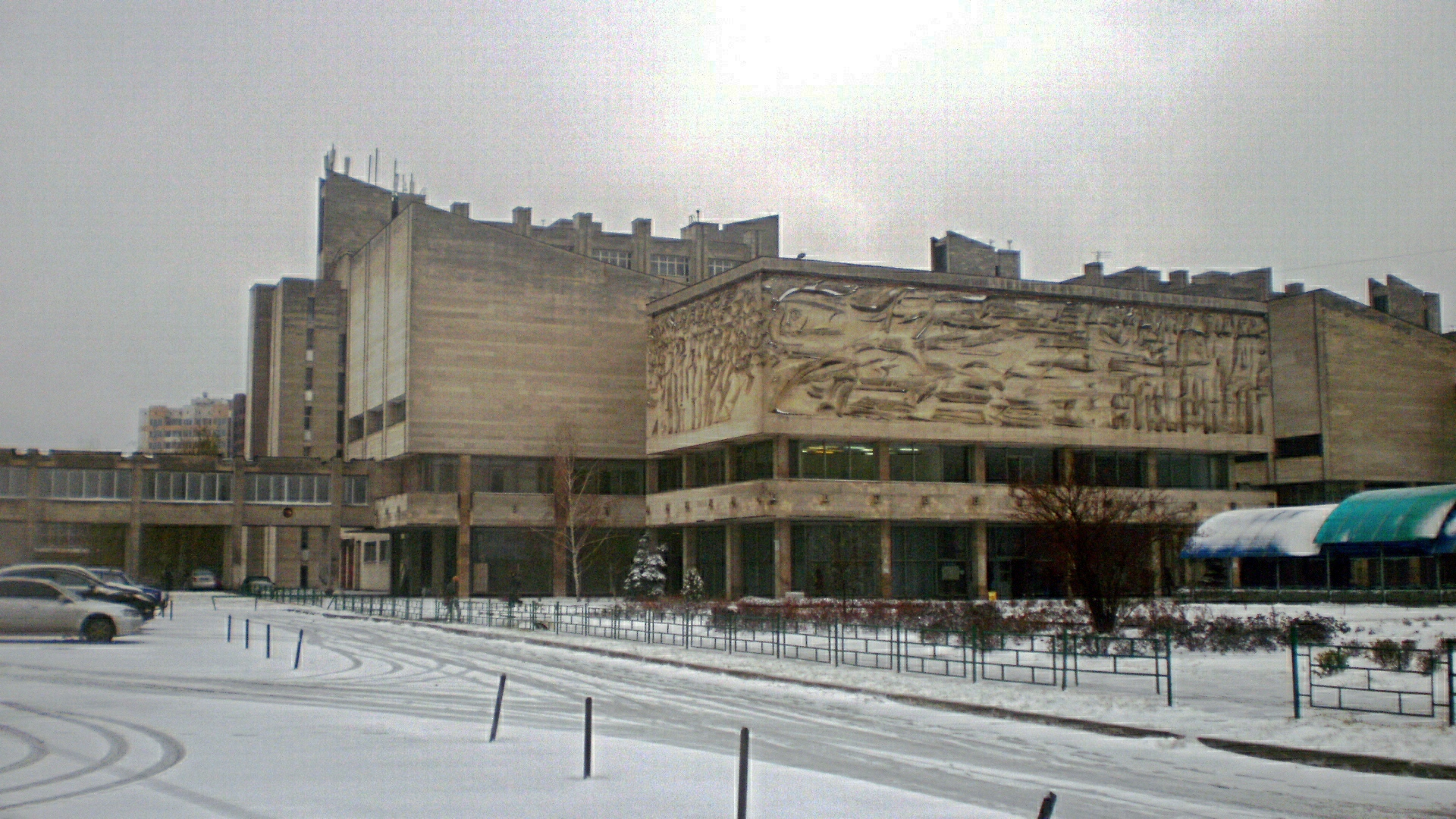
- Type: Public / State
- Established: 1952
- Dean: Igor Anisimov
- Students: approximately 600
- Postgraduates: approximately 50
- Location: Kyiv (Kiev), Ukraine
- Website: rex.knu.ua

Faculty of Radio Physics, Electronics and Computer Systems (formerly known as Faculty of Radiophysics) is a part of National Taras Shevchenko University of Kyiv and is devoted to the fundamental study in different branches of physics on the one hand and mathematics and electronics on the other.

== Foundation and history ==
The Faculty was founded in 1952. Its foundation was caused by the urgent need in a highly skilled engineers' preparation due to the Soviet military–industrial complex requests. Best students from the neighbouring Faculty of Physics were proposed to move into the newly created faculty. Hence, faculty of Radiophysics obtained its first graduators in 1953. The scholarship for the students of radiophysics was twice higher than for their colleagues from other faculties of the University. Interesting fact: Faculty of Radiophysics was subordinated to the Ministry of Defence of USSR (not to the Ministry of Education likewise other faculties were). First years faculty of radiophysics was never mentioned officially. It obtained its official name later on: 'the Faculty #3'. Three departments were created: the department of electrophysics, the department of electronics and the department of radiophysics. Since then the faculty has awarded degrees to over 6,000 graduates. Faculty changed its name to Faculty of Radio Physics, Electronics and Computer Systems on March 5 of 2014.

== Scientific research ==
The present-day major areas of research are physical electronics, radiophysics, micro-, nano- and quantum electronics, low-temperature plasma physics, semiconductor electronics, medical radiophysics. Students are widely involved into scientific research and exploration. This is a characteristic feature of the faculty that corresponds to the Bologna Process requirements. Faculty of radiophysics has established tight relations with scientific and educational centers abroad: United States, France (École centrale de Lyon, Institut polytechnique de Lyon), Taiwan, Germany, the Netherlands, Great Britain, China and others. The teachers, postgraduates and students are involved into international programmes that provide an opportunity to travel abroad and participate in study or research exchange projects. Explorations are carried out within programmes that include:

- nanoelectronics
- plasmochemistry
- low-temperature plasma
- cryogenics
- generation-recombination processes in the highly doped and graded band-gap semiconductors
- physical properties of the metal–semiconductor contact
- laser spectroscopy
- physical processes in the fiber optics flow lines
- spin wave electrodynamics and electronics
- new radiophysical methods' development for the diagnostics and treatment

== Education ==
The Faculty provides taught courses and awards degrees on the following levels:

- Bachelor (4-year full-time course)
- Specialist (1-year full-time course) (till 2010)
- Master (2-year full-time course)

Improvements and innovations in teaching are permanent to meet requirements of the Bologna process. Regular update of the study materials is accompanied by implementation of interactive technologies coupled with practical training. The up to date module-rating system of students’ performance and cutting-edge technologies aimed at development and enhancement of skills are effectively applied at all courses.

== Traditions ==
Twice a year students celebrate The Day of the Faculty. Celebration includes sport competitions between students and professors, mini-performances, funny press-conference of favorite lecturers. Celebrations are usually recorded and available in the Internet.

== Departments ==
Since 1952 the following departments have been created:

- The department of physical electronics (1952)
- The department of quantum radiophysics (The department of radiophysics (till 1962))
- The department of physics of semiconductors (1954)
- The department of electrophysics (1954)
- The department of Mathematics and theoretical radiophysics (1961)
- The department of non-linear optics (1964)
- The department of radioelectronics (1962)
- The department of cryogenic microelectronics (1972)
- The department of Mathematics and theoretical radiophysics (1987)
- The department of medical radiophysics (1995)
- The department of semiconductor electronics (1996, on the base of The department of radioelectronics and The department of the physics of semiconductors)
