= International Particle Physics Outreach Group =

Swiss-based science organization

International Particle Physics Outreach Group (IPPOG)
- Formation: 1997 at CERN
- Type: Science outreach organization
- Website: ippog.org

The International Particle Physics Outreach Group (IPPOG) is a network of scientists, educators, and communicators from several countries that works to improve the public's understanding and appreciation of particle physics. Established in 1997 at CERN, IPPOG works in collaboration with particle physics laboratories and experiments, including CERN, the Pierre Auger Observatory, DESY, and GSI.

== History ==
IPPOG started out as the European Particle Physics Outreach Group (EPPOG) in 1997 with the sponsorship of the European Committee for Future Accelerators (ECFA) and the High Energy Particle Physics Board of the European Physical Society (EPS-HEPP).

In November 2012, EPPOG became IPPOG and soon after added the US as its first country member, followed by Israel, Ireland, Slovenia, Australia and South Africa.

== Activities ==
IPPOG focuses on creating and implementing outreach initiatives related to particle physics. These include exhibitions, educational materials, and events designed for various audiences. Additionally, IPPOG provides resources for science communicators, educators, and physicists to assist in their outreach efforts, aiming to convey the concepts of particle physics in a comprehensible manner.
