= International Physicists' Tournament =

The International Physicists' Tournament (IPT) is a physics competition for undergraduate students, bachelors or master level (or equivalent), in which students representing their nation and institution have typically 9 months to solve a set of challenging unsolved physics problems, then present and defend them to other teams. The tournament originated in Ukraine in 2009 between Ukraine and the Russian Federation, but it has since grown to encompass numerous countries spanning multiple continents. It was initially inspired by the International Young Physicists' Tournament (IYPT) and follows a similar model. Undergraduates may be accompanied by team leaders, who are usually academic research staff or doctoral research students.

== Description ==
Teams of up to 6 students are provided with a list of 17 problems which require a combination of experimental and theoretical approaches to their solution. The problems often have no exact solution and are not described directly in the scientific literature. Teams may also be accompanied by up to two team leaders (usually academic teachers, researchers or students), as well as supporting guests. A typical round in the tournament sees one team acting as a reporter, another acting as an opponent and a third acting as a reviewer. Under special circumstances a fourth team may also be present, which acts purely as an observer. After each round, the teams change roles and repeat until each team has played each role. Each of these roles is outlined below.

=== The Reporter ===
The goal of the reporter is to present their solution to the problem challenged by the opponent. The reporter ideally presents a solution that contains both a theoretical and experimental treatment of the chosen problem. The presentation should include an outline which helps the audience to develop a good physical intuition for the problem.

The reporting team must also be able to defend their solution against criticism. This criticism is provided by the other teams and by a panel of judges called 'the jury' during the discussion that follows the reporting team's presentation.

=== The Opponent ===
The opponent's job is to challenge the reporter to present their solution to one of the 17 initial problems. The goal of the opponent is to find the pros and cons of the reporter's solution and to present their critique it in a short review at the end or the reporters presentation. During this critique, the opponent must suggest the topics that will be the focus of subsequent discussion between the reporting and opposing teams.

=== The Reviewer ===
The goal of the reviewer is to give a brief review of the reporter and opponent presentations. They must then discuss and highlight the main ideas that emerged as a result of this discussion while also highlighting any points that the two teams may have overlooked. Although the reviewer can ask questions to the reporter and opponent and take part in the discussion about the problems, their main role is to help the two other teams to reach a consensus and agree on what has been done and what more could be done to solve the problem.

=== The Observer ===
When more than three teams are present (usually due to the number of participating teams, that cannot be evenly distributed over three), a fourth role is used - that of the observer. The observing team simply watches the round, but cannot participate in any of the discussions.

=== The Jury ===
The jury is made up of a panel of senior academics and members of the IPT international organising committee. Their role is to provide a grade from 1 to 10 for each team and should be one which reflects each team's performance during the round. The grades are awarded based on a series of guidelines which vary for each role (Reporter, Opponent or Reviewer). However, there is a certain level of subjectivity when it comes to awarding the marks and each jury member is encouraged to use his/her discretion when applying the guidelines.

== Organisation ==
The tournament is represented by the International Organising Committee (IOC), which comprises representatives from each of the participating countries as well as the executive committee (also shortened to ExeCom). The tournament is continuously managed by an executive committee composed of PhD and academic researchers and teachers from numerous participating countries. The committee is in charge of the likes of; problem selection, year round communication to participants, maintenance of the website and outreach, maintaining and improving the rules and executing the decisions made by the representatives of the countries part of the IPT. On the local level of the tournament, a Local Organising Committee (LOC) from the host institution and the IOC organises the tournament. The ExeCom, and by extension the IPT, is headed by a president voted by the country representatives once every two years. The other required posts include the secretary, treasurer and the vice-president. The ExeCom has no voting power.

=== National Selections and pre-selection ===
Should more than one institution per country an apply, the participating country should organise a national selection process. This is organised by the IOC member representing the country and ideally follows the format of the international competition using a subset of the 17 problems chosen. Often the winner of these national selections will hold the country's spot in the final tournament. Should the number of countries registering for the tournament outweigh the number of places available (currently 21), a pre-selection process will be engaged. This pre-selection - or qualification - requires teams registered to submit a report on one of a subset of the problems. The reports are graded by peer review from various academic research staff and then a rank is drawn to determine which nation's teams will qualify for the final tournament.

=== During the Tournament ===
The tournament is composed of selective fights (usually four) and a final fight. Every team competes in all the selective fights, but only the three (or four) teams with the largest number of marks after the selective fights take part in the final.

Each fight involves three (or four) teams competing against each other in three (or four) rounds. During each round, these teams will act as either Reporter, Opponent or Reviewer (and Observer, if the group contains four teams). The teams then rotate around each of the roles until each team has played each role.

=== After the Tournament ===
Up to a maximum of two weeks following the previous tournament, suggestions for the next edition's problems are open to the public. Once enough suggested problems have been collected, a committee of academic researchers associated with the IPT gather and form a shortlist of problems for members of participating countries to assign up to 100 points per country to problems. The problems are then ranked by points and re-assessed by the committee, before being released to the public.

== Editions ==
No.	Year	Venue / University	City	Host country	Registered teams	Participating teams	Countries	Gold winner	Silver winner	Bronze winner	Website / Problems
1	2009	Kyiv University	Kyiv	Ukraine	4	4	2	Ukraine	Russia	-	
2	2010	Kyiv University	Kyiv	Ukraine	4	4	2	Russia	Ukraine	-	
3	2011	MIPT	Moscow	Russia	8	8	6	Ukraine	Russia	Slovakia & Switzerland	
4	2012	MIPT	Moscow	Russia	6	6	4	Russia	Ukraine	Switzerland	
5	2013	EPFL	Lausanne	Switzerland	10	10	10	Switzerland	Poland	France	
6	2014	EPFL	Lausanne	Switzerland	9	9	9	France	Ukraine	Denmark	
7	2015	University of Warsaw	Warsaw	Poland	11	11	11	Ukraine	Denmark	France	2015 Website
8	2016	ESPCI	Paris	France	16	15	14	France	Poland	Russia	2016.iptnet.info
9	2017	Chalmers	Gothenburg	Sweden	20	18	15	Ukraine	Sweden	France	2017.iptnet.info
10	2018	MIPT	Moscow	Russia	21	16	16	Switzerland	France	Brazil	2018.iptnet.info
11	2019	EPFL	Lausanne	Switzerland	21	19	16	France	France	Ukraine	2019.iptnet.info
12	2020	Online event			10	10	10	Russia	Ukraine	USA	2020.iptnet.info
13	2021	Online event			12	12	12	Russia	Brazil	Ukraine	2021.iptnet.info
14	2022	Industrial University of Santander	Bucaramanga	Colombia	20	15	15	France	Brazil	Switzerland	2022.iptnet.info
15	2023	École polytechnique	Paris	France	21	18	17	France & Poland	-	Team IPT	2023.iptnet.info
16	2024	ETH Zurich	Zürich	Switzerland	21	21	20	Germany	France	Italy	2024.iptnet.info
17	2025	University of Warsaw	Warsaw	Poland				Germany & Switzerland	-	France	
18	2026	Oklahoma State University	Oklahoma	United States	24	20	18	France	Team IPT	Switzerland	

== Ranking of countries by number of victories ==
Place	Total number of medals				Total
Place	Country	Gold winner	Silver winner	Bronze winner	Total
1	France	5	3	4	12
2	Ukraine	4	4	2	10
3	Russia	4	2	1	7
4	Switzerland	3	0	3	6
5	Germany	2	0	0	2
6	Poland	1	2	0	3
7	Brazil	0	2	1	3
8	Denmark	0	1	1	2
9	Sweden	0	1	0	1
10	Italy	0	0	1	1
11	Slovakia	0	0	1	1
12	USA	0	0	1	1

== Participants ==
Below is a list, along with country of origin, of the institutions who have and currently are participating in the IPT. This may be either through only the pre-selection or the final tournament. Alongside is also indicated past victories with a ★.

- University of Queensland (Australia)
- Federal University of ABC (Brazil)
- Federal University of Minas Gerais (Brazil)
- University of Campinas (Brazil)
- McGill University (Canada)
- Nankai University (China)
- Universidad Nacional de Colombia (Colombia)
- Universidad de los Andes (Colombia)
- Universidad Industrial de Santander (Colombia)
- University of Zagreb (Croatia)
- Technical University of Denmark (Denmark)
- Ecole Normale Supérieure de Lyon★ (France)
- Ecole Normale Superieure Ulm (France)
- Ecole Polytechnique★ (France)
- Goethe University Frankfurt (Germany)
- University of Erlangen–Nuremberg (Germany)
- National and Kapodistrian University of Athens (Greece)
- University of Crete (Greece)
- Shiv Nadar University (India)
- National Institute of Science Education and Research (India)
- Indian Institute of Technology, Madras (India)
- Indian Institute of Science Education and Research, Bhopal (India)
- Ariaian Young Innovative Minds Institute (Iran)
- Politecnico di Milano (Italy)
- University of Milan (Italy)
- University of Bologna (Italy)
- University of Warsaw★ (Poland)
- Jagiellonian University (Poland)
- Moscow Institute of Physics and Technology (Russia)
- Voronezh State University (Russia)
- University of Ljubljana (Slovenia)
- Complutense University of Madrid (Spain)
- Harvard University (United States of America)
- Dartmouth College (United States of America)
- Columbia University (United States of America)
- University of California, Berkeley (United States of America)
- Rice University (United States of America)
- Oklahoma State University (United States of America)
- University of Arizona (United States of America)
- University of Nottingham (United Kingdom)
- King's College London (United Kingdom)
- Lviv Polytechnic (Ukraine)
- Kharkiv National University★(Ukraine)
- Kyiv National University (Ukraine)
- Chalmers University of Technology (Sweden)
- KTH Royal Institute of Technology (Sweden)
- Ecole Polytechnique Federale de Lausanne★ (Switzerland)
- ETH Zurich (Switzerland)
- Universidad Simon Bolivar (Venezuela)
- Universidad de Oviedo (Spain)

== History ==
=== Original Logo ===
The first logo of the International Physicists' Tournament consisted of a collage representing the different fields of physics. The general outline represent electron orbits around a coat of arms. Six symbols placed in the orbit lobs represents (clockwise) Atomic physics, Crystallography, Classical mechanics, Thermodynamics, Electromagnetism and Optics. Two wands crossing over the arm of coats symbolises the confrontation during the Physics Fights. Finally, a ribbon is laid across the logo with the letters IPT imprinted in the middle.

== See also ==
- International Young Physicists' Tournament
