= International Young Physicists' Tournament =

Scientific competition

The International Young Physicists’ Tournament (IYPT)
- IYPT 2027 will take place in Auckland, New Zealand

Information
- Other name: Physics World Cup
- Type: Secondary School Scientific Competition
- Founded: 1988
- Founder: Dr. h.c. Evgeny Yunosov
- President: Assoc. Prof. RNDr. Martin Plesch, PhD.
- Teams: 41
- Website: https://www.iypt.org
- Last updated: August 8, 2026

The International Young Physicists' Tournament (IYPT), sometimes referred to as the "Physics World Cup", is a scientific competition between teams of secondary school students. It mimics, as closely as possible, the real-world scientific research and the process of presenting and defending the results obtained.

== Description ==
Participants have almost a year to work on 17 open-ended inquiry problems that are published yearly in late July. A good part of the problems involves easy-to-reproduce phenomena presenting unexpected behaviour. The aim of the solutions is not to calculate or reach "the correct answer" as there is no such notion here. The Tournament is rather conclusions-oriented as participants have to design and perform experiments, and to draw conclusions argued from the experiments’ outcome.

The competition itself is not a pen-and-paper competition but an enactment of a scientific discussion (or a defence of a thesis) where participants take the roles of journalist reporter, opponent, and reviewer, learning about peer review early on in their school years. Discussion-based sessions are called Physics Fights and the performances of the teams are judged by expert physicists.

Teams can take quite different routes to tackle the same problem. As long as they stay within the broadly defined statement of the problem, all routes are legitimate and teams will be judged according to the depths reached by their investigations.

The IYPT is a week-long event in which currently around 200 international pre-university contestants participate.

IYPT is associated with The European Physical Society (EPS) and in 2013, IYPT was awarded the medal of The International Union of Pure and Applied Physics (IUPAP) "in recognition of its inspiring and wide-ranging contribution to physics education that has touched many lives and countries, over the past 25 years".

== History ==
The International Young Physicists' Tournament (IYPT) originated in the former Soviet Union and expanded internationally in 1988. Following its European roots, the tournament expanded globally, with the first non-European event held in Brisbane, Australia, in 2004. Participation has since grown to over 38 countries, representing every continent.

Over time the IYPT has transitioned from a community initiative to a formally registered corporation. National organizations now organize qualifying competitions and represent their countries within IYPT committees, with many receiving official recognition.

== Tournament structure ==
The most important structural parts of the IYPT are the physics fights. There are five selective fights, and one final fight for the top teams at the end. The structure of these Fights can be compared to the group phase of a football competition (e.g. FIFA World Cup).

Each fight consists of 3 (or 4) stages. In each stage, every team in a given Fight room has one role of the following: reporter, opponent, reviewer, and observer (if there are 4 teams in a Fight). During the 3 (or 4) stages, they "rotate", so that every team has all the roles exactly once, represented by the following tables:

Three-teams Physics Fight
Stage	1	2	3
Team 1	Rep.	Rev.	Opp.
Team 2	Opp.	Rep.	Rev.
Team 3	Rev.	Opp.	Rep.

Four-teams Physics Fight
Stage	1	2	3	4
Team 1	Rep.	Obs.	Rev.	Opp.
Team 2	Opp.	Rep.	Obs.	Rev.
Team 3	Rev.	Opp.	Rep.	Obs.
Team 4	Ops.	Rev.	Opp.	Rep.

The following table represents the structure of a single Stage:

Stage regulations
Event	Duration	Reporter	Opponent	Reviewer	Jury
The Opp. challenges the Rep. for the problem	1 min.		active		
The Rep. accepts or rejects the challenge	1 min.	active			
Preparation of the Rep.	4 min.				
Presentation of the report	12 min.	active			
Short questions of the Opp. to the Rep. and answers of the Rep.	2 min.	active	active		
Preparation of the Opp.	3 min.				
Opp. presentation	max. 4 min.		active		
Discussion	10 min. + remaining time from the Opp. presentation	active	active		
Summary of the Discussion	1 min.		active		
Questions of the Rev. to the Rep. and the Opp. and answers	3 min.	active	active	active	
Preparation of the Rev.	2 min.				
Rev. presentation	5 min.			active	
Concluding remarks	2 min.	active			
Questions of the Jury	5 min.	active	active	active	active

In the last Selective PF and in the Final PF the procedure of challenge is omitted.

== Timeline table ==
Year	No.	Venue	Host country	No. of teams	No. of countries	Gold winner(s)	Silver winner(s)
1988	1st	Moscow	Soviet Union	31	3	Disputable	Disputable
1989	2nd	Moscow	Soviet Union	8	7	West Germany, Bulgaria	(Russian Soviet Federative Socialist Republic) RSFSR-School 710, Moscow
1990	3rd	Moscow	Soviet Union	6	5 *	(Russian Soviet Federative Socialist Republic) RSFSR-School 542, Moscow	(Latvia) Latvian SSR-Riga, Netherlands
1991	4th	Moscow	Soviet Union	7	6 *	Hungary	Poland, (Soviet Union) Soviet Combined team
1992	5th	Protvino	Russia	12	10	Belarus, Czechoslovakia	Netherlands, Russia
1993	6th	Protvino	Russia	19	11	Georgia	Ukraine, Hungary
1994	7th	Groningen	Netherlands	12	11	Czech Republic, Russia	Georgia
1995	8th	Spała	Poland	15	12	Germany	Czech Republic, Hungary
1996	9th	Tskaltubo	Georgia	13	10	Czech Republic	Germany, Georgia-2
1997	10th	Cheb	Czech Republic	15	11	Hungary, Czech Republic	Belarus
1998	11th	Donaueschingen	Germany	18	16	Czech Republic	Germany-1, Poland
1999	12th	Vienna	Austria	19	17	Germany	Georgia, Austria-1
2000	13th	Budapest	Hungary	17	16	Poland-2	Germany, Russia
2001	14th	Espoo	Finland	18	16	Slovakia	Australia, Germany
2002	15th	Odesa	Ukraine	20	18	Poland	Belarus, Germany
2003	16th	Uppsala	Sweden	23	22	Germany	South Korea, Poland
2004	17th	Brisbane	Australia	26	24	Poland	Germany, Slovakia
2005	18th	Winterthur	Switzerland	25	23	Germany	Belarus, United States
2006	19th	Bratislava	Slovakia	26	24	Croatia	South Korea, Germany
2007	20th	Seoul	South Korea	22	21	Australia	South Korea-2, New Zealand
2008	21st	Trogir	Croatia	21	21	Germany	Croatia, New Zealand
2009	22nd	Tianjin	China	27	27	South Korea	Austria, New Zealand
2010	23rd	Vienna	Austria	23	23	Singapore, Austria, New Zealand, South Korea	Germany, Chinese Taipei, Iran, Australia, Slovakia
2011	24th	Tehran	Iran	21	21	South Korea, Austria, Germany	Chinese Taipei, Iran, Slovakia, Singapore, Belarus
2012	25th	Bad Saulgau	Germany	28	28	South Korea, Iran, Singapore	Belarus, Germany, Chinese Taipei, Switzerland, Austria
2013	26th	Taipei	Chinese Taipei	26	26	Singapore, South Korea, Switzerland	Poland, New Zealand, Slovakia, Sweden, Brazil
2014	27th	Shrewsbury	United Kingdom	28	28	Singapore, Slovakia, Poland, China	South Korea, New Zealand, Chinese Taipei, Russia, Germany
2015	28th	Nakhon Ratchasima	Thailand	27	27	Singapore, Poland, China	Slovakia, Brazil, Bulgaria, Russia, South Korea
2016	29th	Ekaterinburg	Russia	29	29	Singapore, Germany, Switzerland, Chinese Taipei	South Korea, Slovakia, New Zealand, China, Hungary
2017	30th	Singapore	Singapore	30	30	Singapore, China, Poland, Hungary	New Zealand, Germany, Chinese Taipei, Brazil, Czechia
2018	31st	Beijing	China	32	32	Singapore, China, Germany, Korea	Brazil, Sweden, Slovakia, Poland, Ukraine
2019	32nd	Warsaw	Poland	36	36	Singapore, Germany, Switzerland, China	Korea, Brazil, Ukraine, New Zealand, Sweden
2020	33rd	Not held due to COVID-19					
2021	34th	Kutaisi	Georgia	15	15	Poland, Slovakia, Austria	Ukraine, Hungary, Georgia, Switzerland, Russia
2022	35th	Timișoara	Romania	25	25	Switzerland, Singapore, Poland	Chinese Taipei, Ukraine, Germany, Czechia, Hungary
2023	36th	Murree	Pakistan	14	14	Poland, Thailand, Slovakia	China, Ukraine, Czechia, Hungary, Brazil
2024	37th	Budapest	Hungary	38	38	Singapore, Ukraine, Poland, Chinese Taipei	Germany, Slovakia, Switzerland, China, Bulgaria
2025	38th	Lund	Sweden	35	35	Singapore, China, Germany, Slovakia	Poland, Chinese Taipei, South Korea, Thailand, Austria, Brazil
2026	39th	Zurich	Switzerland	35	35	Singapore, South Korea, Germany, Czech Republic	China, Chinese Taipei, Slovakia, Switzerland, New Zealand, Serbia
2027	40th	Auckland	New Zealand	TBD	TBD	TBD	TBD

(*) the number of Nations can be disputed as some countries were midway towards a recognized independence

== See also ==
- IYPT 2011
