= Yaroslav Mudryi National Law University =

Public university in Kharkiv, Ukraine

Coordinates: 50.004935°N 36.247811°E

- Національний юридичний університет імені Ярослава Мудрого
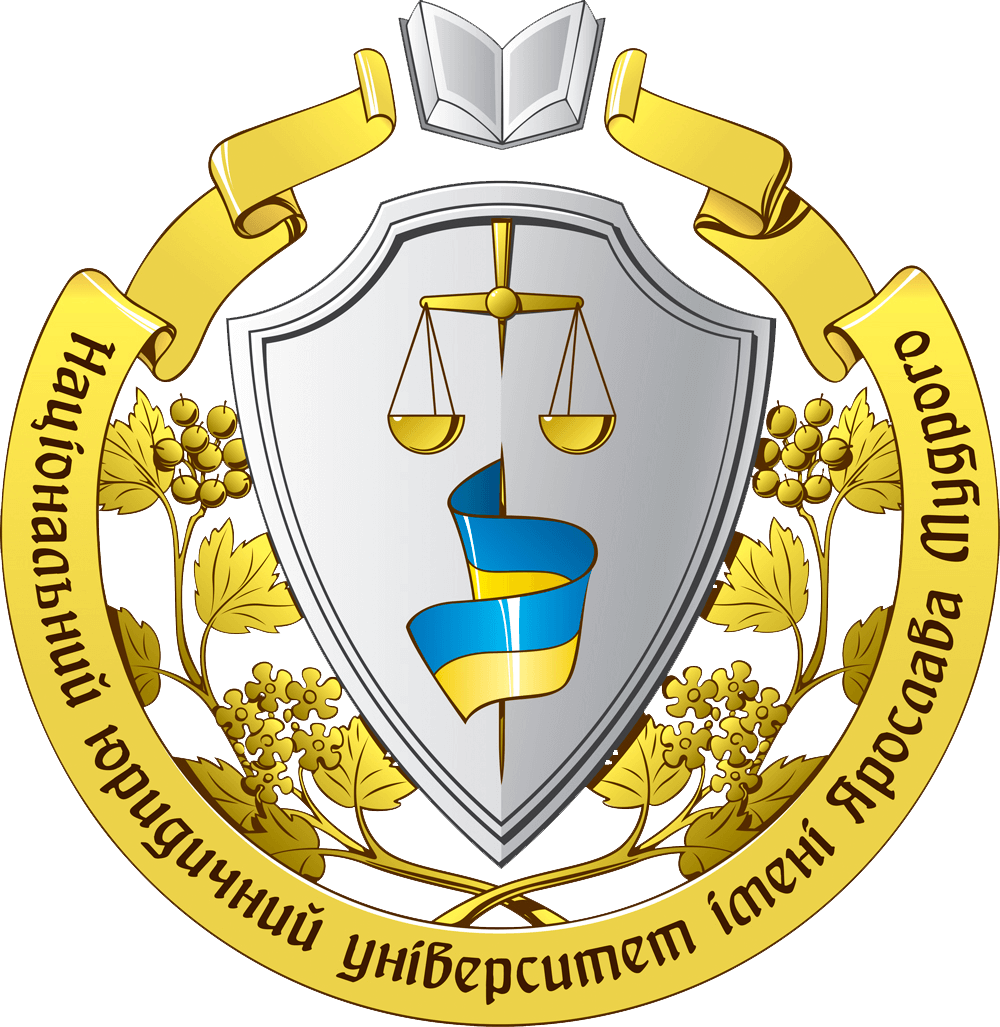
- Coat of arms
- Former names: List: Department of Moral and Political Sciences of Kharkiv University (1804–1835); Faculty of Law of the Imperial Kharkiv University (1835–1920); Institute of National Economy (1920–1930); Institute of Soviet Construction and Law (1930—1933); Ukrainian Communist Institute of Soviet Construction and Law (1933—1937); Kharkiv Law Institute (1937—1991); National Law Academy of Ukraine (1991—1995); Yaroslav Mudryi National Law Academy of Ukraine (1994—2010); National University «Yaroslav Mudryi Law Academy of Ukraine» (2010—2013)
- Motto: Vivat Lex! (Latin); Хай живе закон! (Ukrainian)
- Motto in English: Long live the law!
- Type: National university
- Established: 17 November 1804; 221 years ago (as a Department of Moral and Political Sciences of Kharkiv University); 23 September 1930; 96 years ago (as a Institute of Soviet Construction and Law)
- Affiliations: Ministry of Education and Science of Ukraine
- Academic affiliations: IAU, EUA, UNAI
- Rector: Anatolii Hetman
- Faculty: 647
- Students: 9,591
- Doctoral students: 131
- Location: Hryhorii Skovoroda Street, 77, 61024, Kharkiv, Ukraine
- Campus: Urban
- Colors: Gold & Silver
- Nickname: Yurakademiya
- Website: nlu.edu.ua
- Building details
- Головний корпус НЮУ ім. Ярослава Мудрого
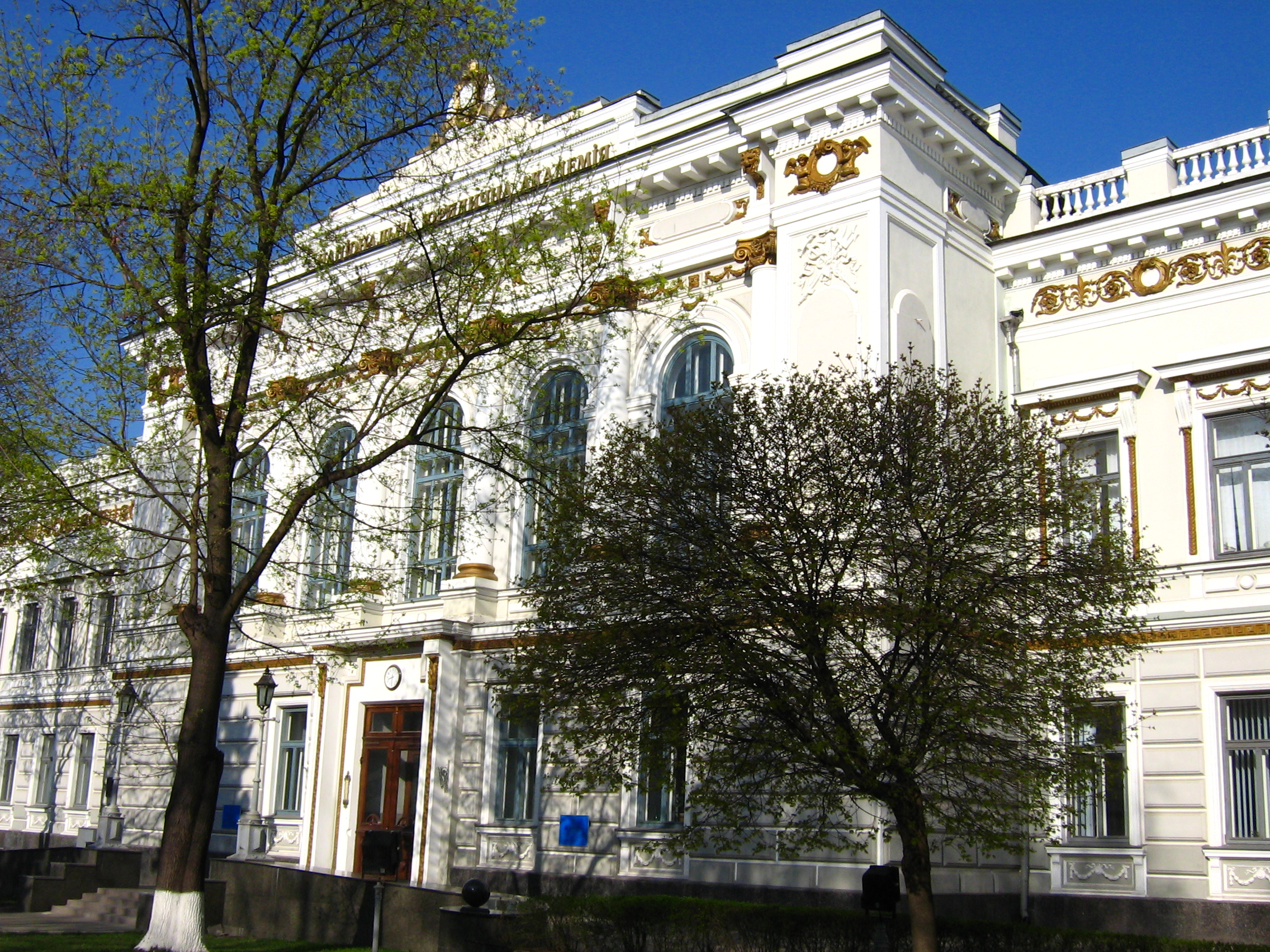
- University main building

General information
- Location: Kharkiv, Ukraine
- Completed: 1893

Yaroslav Mudryi National Law University (Ukrainian: Національний юридичний університет імені Ярослава Мудрого) is a self-governing state higher law educational establishment of the IV level of accreditation, a national university, located in Kharkiv, Ukraine, named after Yaroslav the Wise. National Law University is the largest law school in Ukraine, which includes 10 faculties, institutes and colleges located in Kharkiv and Poltava.

The Yaroslav Mudryi National Law University is consistently ranked among the top three law schools in Ukraine.

== History ==
As a separate law school, the institution was established in 1930 as Kharkiv Institute of Soviet Construction and Law. However, its heritage could be traced back to 1804 with establishment of the main city university, the Kharkiv University (now Karazin University).

=== Imperial Kharkiv University ===
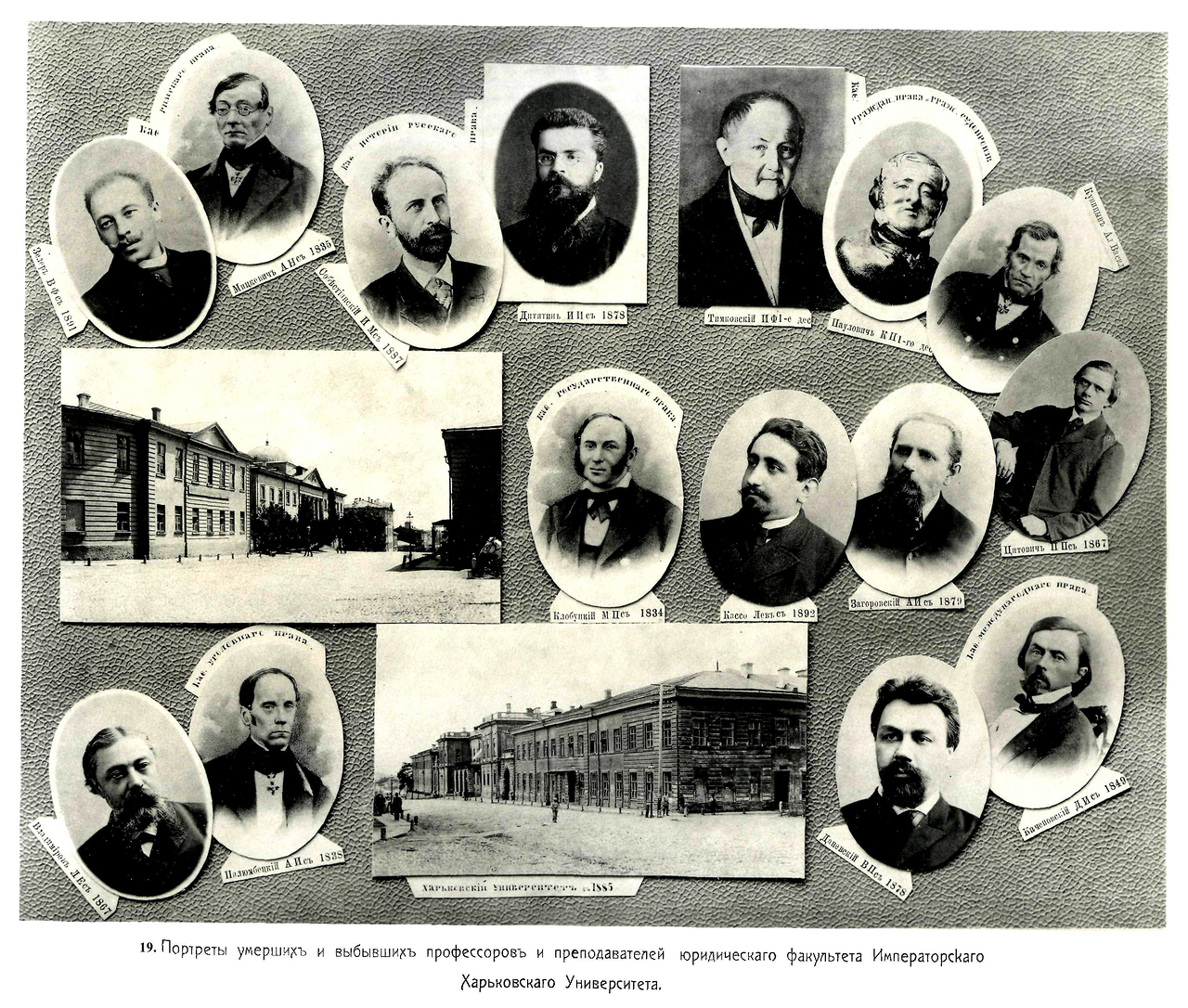
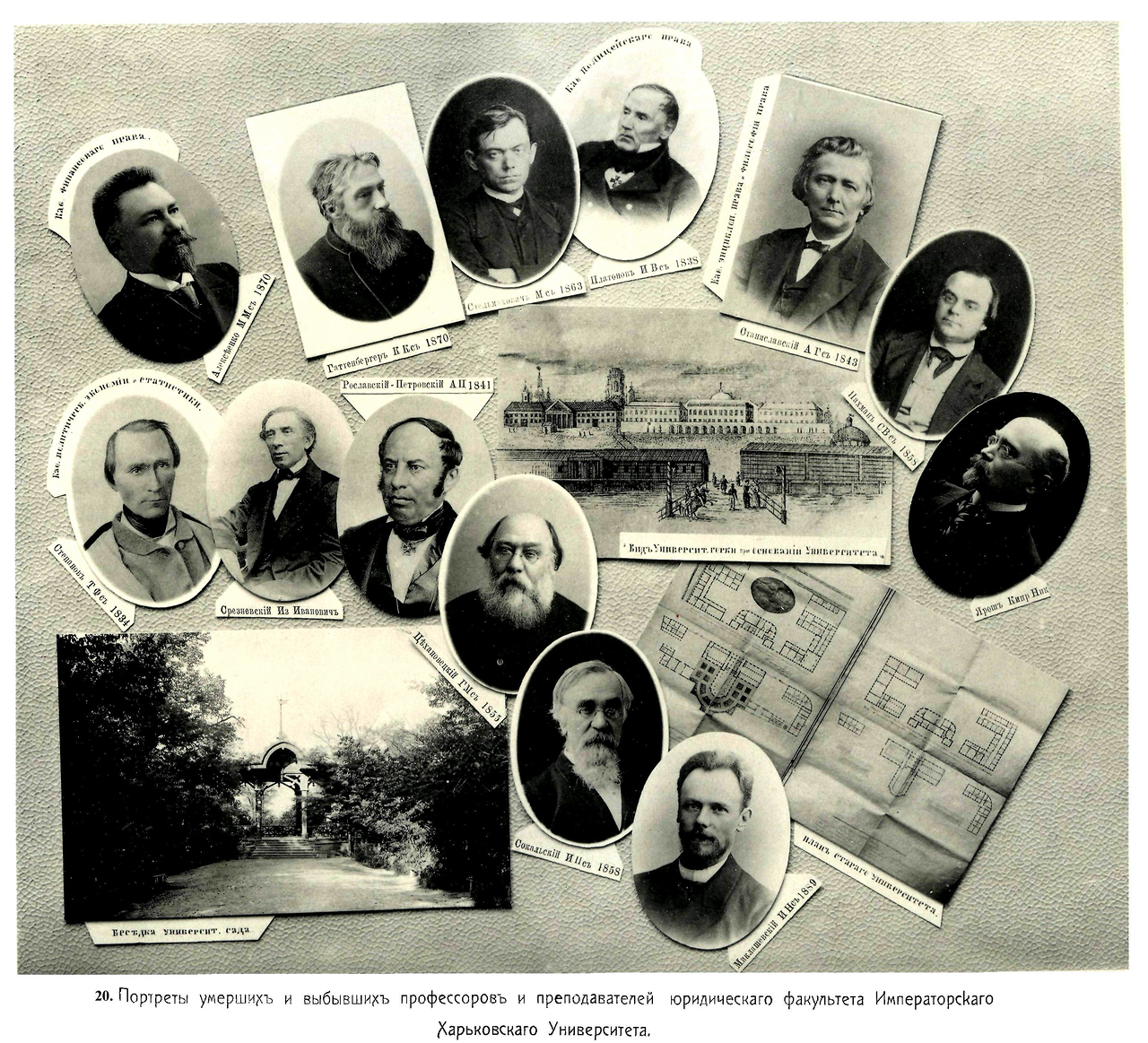
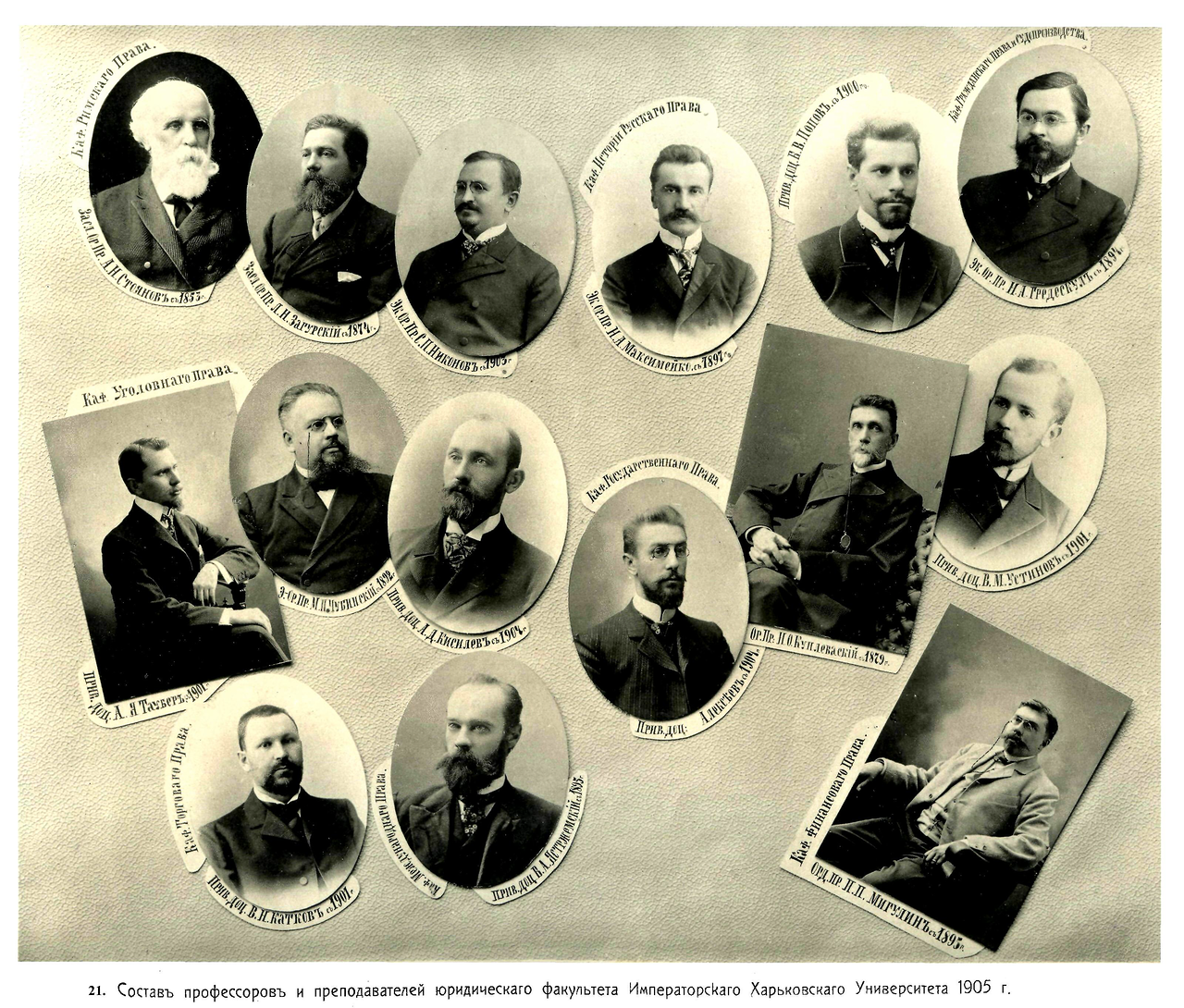

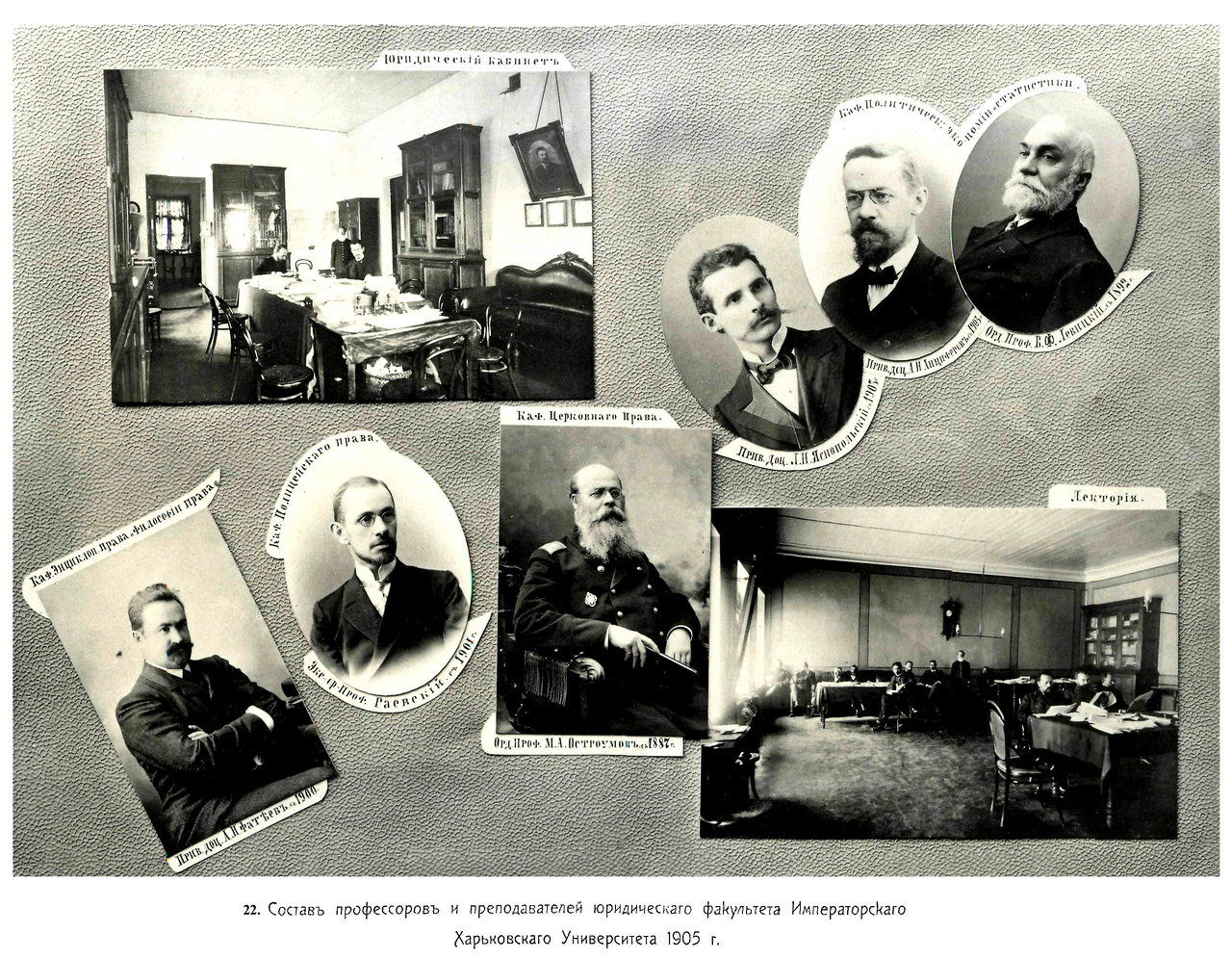
Faculty and teaching staff of the Faculty of Law of the Imperial University of Kharkiv, 1905

The history of the school began in the 19th century by the order of Alexander I with the establishment of the Imperial Kharkiv University on 17 November [O.S. 5 November] 1804 and the Department of Moral and Political Sciences as its part.

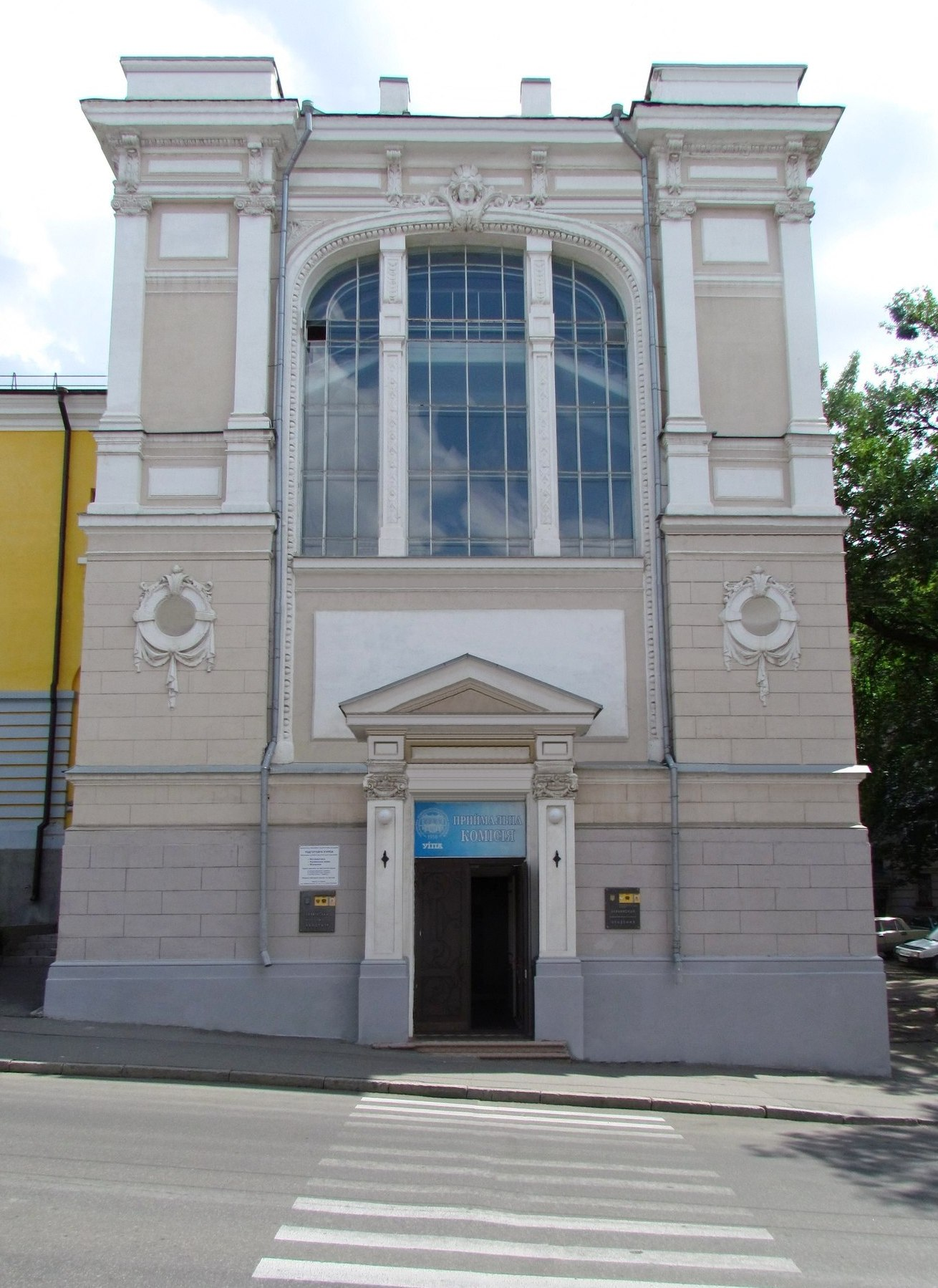
Former building of the Faculty of Law of Kharkiv University, built in 1909.

During its initial decades, the organization and operation of Kharkiv Imperial University were governed by its founding charter of 1804, which had been approved by Alexander I. Subsequently, the university's legal framework relied on the general charters of imperial Russian universities enacted in 1835, 1863, and 1884. A more comprehensive structure was introduced by the "General Charter of Imperial Russian Universities" on July 26, 1835. Under these new regulations, the university's existing department of moral and political sciences was officially reorganized and renamed the Faculty of Law in 1835.

Pursuant to Article 100 of the 1835 Charter, the complete course of study at the Faculty of Law lasted four years. The charter also granted the faculty the authority to conduct examinations for academic degrees and hold dissertation defenses. For instance, in 1844, Alexander Palumbetsky successfully defended his doctoral dissertation in law, titled "On the System of Judicial Evidence in Ancient Germanic Law in Comparison with Russkaya Pravda and Later Closely Related Russian Laws."

Under the 1835 Charter, the curriculum of the Faculty of Law included seven core disciplines, each directly corresponding to an established academic chair. These fields of study encompassed the encyclopedia or general overview of the system of jurisprudence alongside Russian state laws, which comprised fundamental laws, laws on social estates, and state institutions. The curriculum also covered Roman legislation and its history, general, fundamental, and local civil laws, the laws of public order and decency (Blagochinie), laws on state obligations and finance, police and criminal laws, and the principles of general jurisprudence. Compared to the original 1804 charter, the 1835 reform established five new chairs dedicated specifically to domestic legislation and introduced a new foundational course, the Encyclopedia of Jurisprudence.

The University Charter of 1863 significantly expanded the faculty, providing for thirteen professors and six docents. The number of academic chairs was expanded to thirteen, incorporating highly specialized sub-disciplines. The curriculum grew to include the encyclopedia of law, which combined the encyclopedia of legal and political sciences with the history of the philosophy of law. It also featured the history of foreign legislation covering major ancient and modern foreign legal systems, the history of Russian law, and the history of Slavic legislation.

Roman law was split into its history, the dogmatics of Roman civil law, and Byzantine law, while constitutional law covered the theory of constitutional law alongside the constitutional laws of major states and Russia. Furthermore, specialized chairs were established for civil law, civil judiciary, and legal procedure, as well as criminal law, criminal judiciary, and legal procedure. Police law was divided into the doctrine of public safety and the doctrine of public welfare, while financial law integrated the theory of finance with Russian financial law. The expansion was completed by distinct departments for international law, political economy and statistics, and ecclesiastical jurisprudence.

From its inception, the university maintained a distinct hierarchy of teaching positions. These academic ranks included adjuncts, who served as assistant professors, and extraordinary professors, who were non-tenured faculty members that did not head an academic chair or hold seats on the faculty's academic council. Higher ranks comprised ordinary, fully tenured professors, alongside docents and masters. Additionally, the university utilized privat-docents, a designation applied either to experienced instructors with substantial practical achievements who lacked a postgraduate degree, or to those who held a degree but had not yet formally attained the rank of docent.

Over its first century of existence, the Faculty of Law at Kharkiv University steadily consolidated its academic foundations and expanded its institutional reach, experiencing consistent growth in both its student body and its teaching faculty.

At different times famous lawyers worked here, such as professors Mikhail Alekseyenko, Leonid Vladimirov, Nikolay Gredeskul, Vsevolod Danevskyi, Ivan Ditiatin, Leonid Zahurskyi, Dmitri Kachenovsky, Alexey Kunitsyn, Nikolay Kuplevaskyi, Alexey Paliumbetskyi, Andrey Stoianov, Mikhail Taube, Ilya Timkovsky, Mikhail Chubinskyi and others.

Following the October Revolution and the subsequent establishment of Soviet rule in Ukraine, Kharkiv Imperial University and its Faculty of Law entered a period of severe disruption. Administration of the university was transferred to the People's Commissariat for Education of the Ukrainian SSR (Narkompros). Through its decree of March 11, 1919, titled "On the Organization of the Management of Higher Educational Institutions," Narkompros attempted to implement a restructuring of higher education administration. The primary objective was to wrest institutional control from the traditional, established professor-led administration and transfer it to Soviet authorities. This shift was intended to garner political support from the working-class and proletarian student body while gradually integrating the pre-revolutionary teaching staff into the new ideologically driven educational framework.

Under these new regulations, primary administrative authority was vested in a commissar appointed by Narkompros. Concurrently, collective governing bodies managed academic, scientific, and educational activities. Faculty councils were established within each department, consisting of lecturing faculty, a small cohort of teaching assistants, and student representatives whose numbers equaled the total count of lecturers. Faculty councils then selected four delegates each to form the university’s overarching Scientific and Educational Council.

During the era of War Communism, these newly formed administrative bodies rapidly abolished several traditional core requirements within the Faculty of Law, including courses on the history and dogmas of Roman law and administrative-political law. By the spring of 1919, a broader climate of legal nihilism led some Soviet authorities to question the necessity of maintaining university law faculties altogether. For instance, the People's Commissar for Justice of the Ukrainian SSR, Aleksandr Khmelnitsky, citing discussions with Education Commissar Volodymyr Zatonsky, stated that the law faculty would likely be abolished and replaced with a specialized department within the Faculty of History and Philology offering a limited curriculum of eight legal disciplines.

Soviet administrative control was temporarily interrupted in June 1919, when the Soviet government in Kharkiv collapsed under the advance of General Anton Denikin Volunteer Army. This political shift created temporary conditions for restoring the university to its pre-Soviet organizational standards, which included resuming traditional student admissions. Of the 575 applications for enrollment submitted by September 20, 1919, seventy were directed to the Faculty of Law. However, this restoration proved brief, as Soviet forces recaptured Kharkiv on December 12, 1919. This event initiated a decisive shift in policy that ultimately culminated in the formal dissolution of the university, ending the operations of one of Ukraine's prominent educational and scientific institutions.

=== Institute of National Economy & Institute of Soviet Construction and Law ===
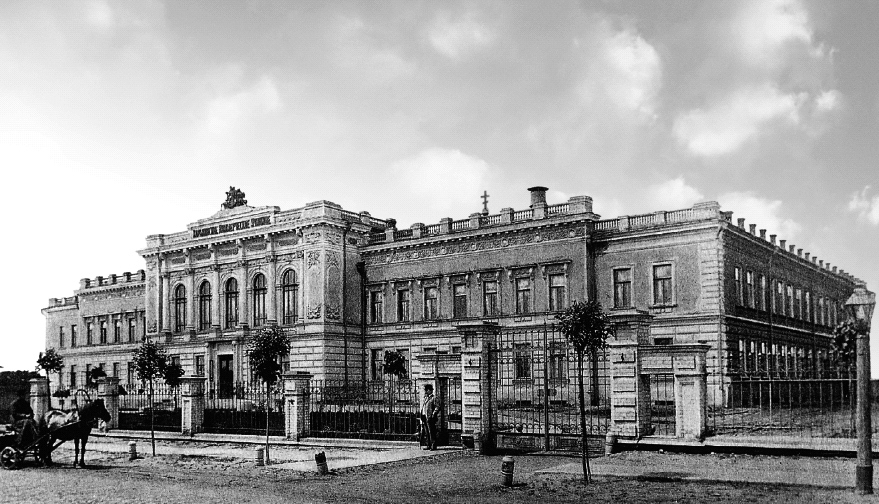
Kharkiv Commercial School of Emperor Alexander III, 1896

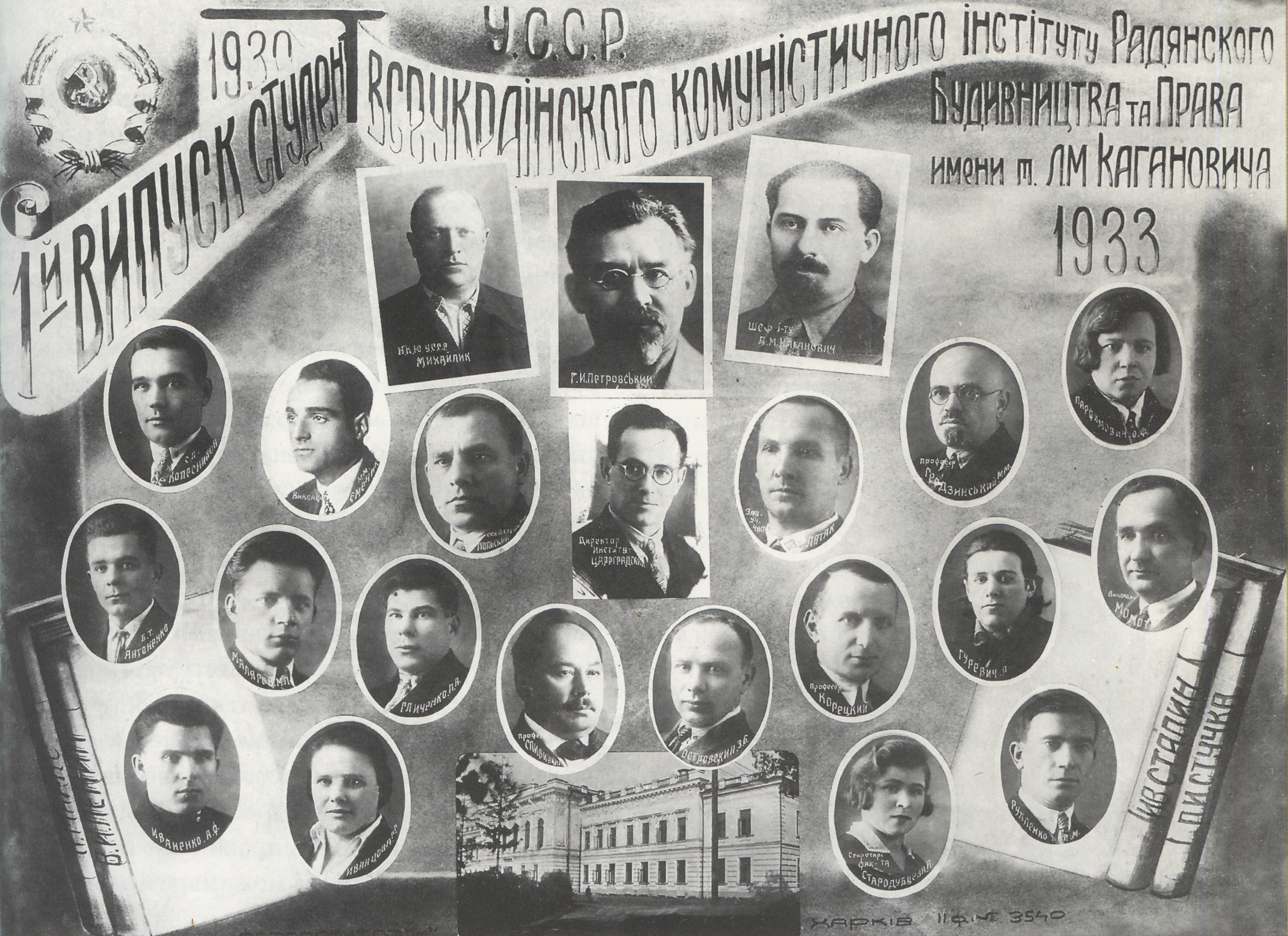
Graduates and faculty of the All-Ukrainian Communist Institute of Soviet Construction and Law, 1933

In the early 1920s, Narkompros leadership actively pursued the liquidation of universities as institutions dedicated to "pure science," seeking instead to replace them with highly specialized, vocational schools. Within Narkompros, humanities and humanities-adjacent specializations—including legal education—were viewed through the lens of economic materialism. Consequently, Soviet educational policy mandated that legal and social science training be strictly tied to specific sectors of the national economy, such as industry, commerce, or agriculture, rather than existing as independent academic disciplines.

In 1920 by the decision of the Soviet government of Ukraine the Kharkiv Institute of National Economy was established on the basis of the Kharkiv Commercial School. The former Faculty of Law of the Imperial Kharkiv University was transferred to the newly created university.

It was the basis of the Law Institute which trained lawyers for state and economic bodies. The first lecturers of the law faculty – the founders of the Institute – were law professors: Volodymyr Hordon, Volodymyr Koretskyi, Oleksandr Kisilev, Mykola Maksimeyko, Mykola Palienko, Volodymyr Slivitskyi, Volodymyr Trakhterov and others who worked at the Kharkiv University before. They were holding scientific and teaching positions for many years and made a great contribution into formation and development of law science, lawyers' education and training.

In 1930 The Institute of National Economy, taking into consideration its status of an institute of higher legal education, received a new name: the Institute of Soviet Construction and Law. In May 1933 the institute was renamed into the Ukrainian Communist Institute of Soviet Construction and Law.

The primary mission of the new higher education institution was to train legal professionals and civil servants for the government bodies of the Ukrainian SSR, which were then located in the former capital, the city of Kharkiv. The Institute of Soviet Construction and Law trained personnel for the prosecution service, judicial authorities, and state and communist party institutions.

=== Kharkiv Law Institute ===
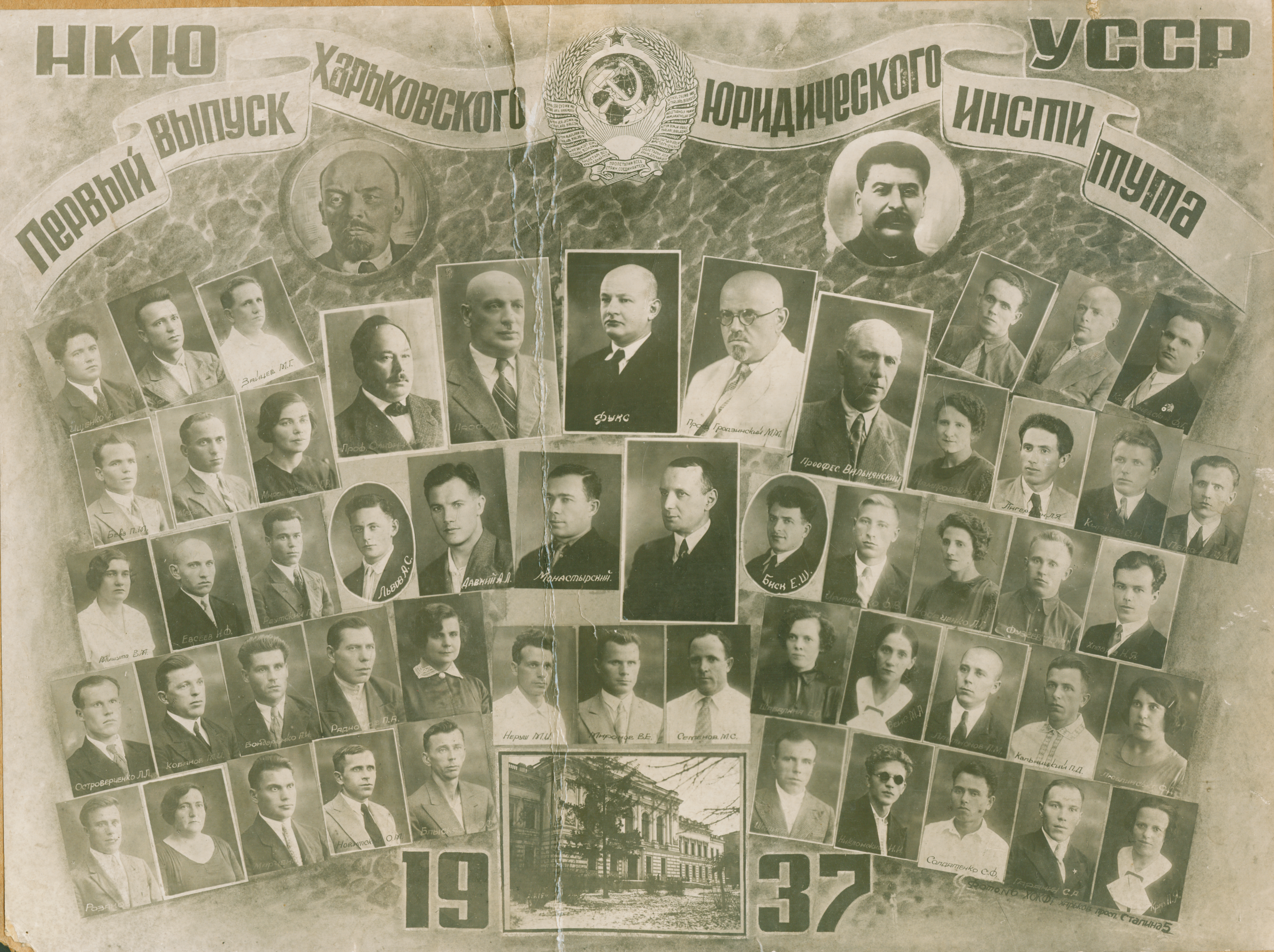
Graduates and lecturers of the Kharkiv Law Institute, 1937

On July 1, 1937, the institution was renamed the Kharkiv Law Institute. Between 1930 and 1937, the institute comprised a preparatory department with full-time and evening courses, a faculty of Soviet construction, a legal (judicial) faculty, a correspondence department, as well as economic-legal and international faculties, both of which were abolished in 1933. The institute trained generalist legal professionals for careers in courts, prosecution, criminal investigation, advocacy, and notary offices.

The establishment of the Kharkiv Law Institute facilitated advancements in legal training and academic research. The institute was tasked with educating generalist legal professionals for careers in law enforcement and other government agencies, which directly shaped its curriculum. Initially, the course on the doctrine of state and law integrated elements of the theory of state and law, the history of state and law, the history of political doctrines, as well as constitutional, administrative, and international law. Over time, this curriculum was refined, leading to the crystallization of distinct academic courses. Independent programs were introduced for Soviet constitutional, administrative, and financial law, and institute graduates began taking state examinations.

At the same time, the educational and scientific work of the institute was significantly affected by the broader context of Stalinist repressions. By the early 1930s, the administrative-command management system and the totalitarian state regime restricted academic initiative, leading to increased censorship and mutual distrust among the faculty. This environment resulted in a sharp decline in academic publications compared to the 1920s, as well as the rise of dogmatism and formalism. The institute was deeply impacted by the purges; several faculty members and students fell victim to the repressions, including former directors Sergey Kanarskyi and Mykola Levikov, who were executed by the NKVD.

Monument to students, teachers and staff of the Law Institute who died during the Great Patriotic War.

The institute's academic operations were disrupted by the German invasion during World War II, during which many pre-war institutional documents were destroyed. Following the outbreak of hostilities on the Eastern Front in June 1941, the faculty and administration mobilized for the war effort. Faculty and students capable of military service joined the Red Army. Notably, V. P. Kolmakov and D. P. Rasieikin left for military units on June 24, 1941, immediately after defending their candidate dissertations. Nearly the entire graduating class of 1941 was sent to the Military Law Academy for specialized training, while 30 female students who had completed nursing courses were deployed to military units and hospitals. Several faculty members served in the military justice system, including V. O. Barakhtian and L. Ye. Orel in the military tribunal, and M. Yo. Baru in the military prosecutor's office.

Following the Axis occupation of Kharkiv, the institute temporarily suspended its operations. In August 1941, through an agreement with the People's Commissariat of Justice of the USSR (Narkomiust), several professors were evacuated to legal higher education institutions in the Soviet rear. S. L. Fuks and V. I. Slyvytskyi were transferred to the Alma-Ata Institute of Law, S. I. Vilnianskyi to the Saratov Institute of Law, M. V. Gordon and Vladimir Koretsky to the Tashkent Institute of Law, M. M. Hrodzynskyi to the All-Union Institute of Legal Sciences (temporarily relocated to Chkalov), and O. M. Yakuba to the Sverdlovsk Institute of Law.

On August 23, 1943, Kharkiv was liberated from German occupation. On September 25, the All-Union Committee for Higher Education and the People's Commissariat of Justice of the USSR issued a joint decree to resume the operations of the Kharkiv Law Institute. On November 4, 1943, the Council of People's Commissars of the Ukrainian SSR (Radnarkom) approved an order recalling the institute's director, V. O. Barakhtian, from the active army. He was dispatched to the People's Commissariat of Justice of the Ukrainian SSR in Kharkiv to restore the educational infrastructure and organize a new student enrollment. The task was complex, as the institute's primary building, library, and two dormitories had been largely destroyed or looted during the war. Despite these losses, the institution managed to resume its activities.

Throughout 1943 and 1944, the core pre-war faculty returned from the front lines and evacuation zones. By the beginning of the 1944/1945 academic year, the institute employed 42 instructors. However, several faculty members were killed in action during the war, including candidates of legal sciences I. N. Bekker and M. K. Pochapskyi, as well as senior lecturer P. A. Rudyk.

On the 20th anniversary of the victory in Europe, an Alley of Memory was established in the institute's courtyard to honor the faculty, staff, and students who lost their lives in the war. In 1970, a monument funded by donations from the institute's staff and students was unveiled to commemorate the defenders.

Alongside their teaching responsibilities and the mentorship of new academic generations, the institute's scholars conducted diverse research and provided extensive assistance to the legislative, judicial, and law enforcement agencies of the Ukrainian SSR. They actively participated in the second codification of Ukrainian law during the late 1950s and early 1960s. Many researchers joined working groups tasked with drafting the Civil, Civil Procedure, Criminal, and Criminal Procedure Codes, as well as the Code on Marriage, Family, and Guardianship, and the Labour Code, among others. Their contributions to the codification of Ukrainian legislation received high recognition from both the government and the legal community.

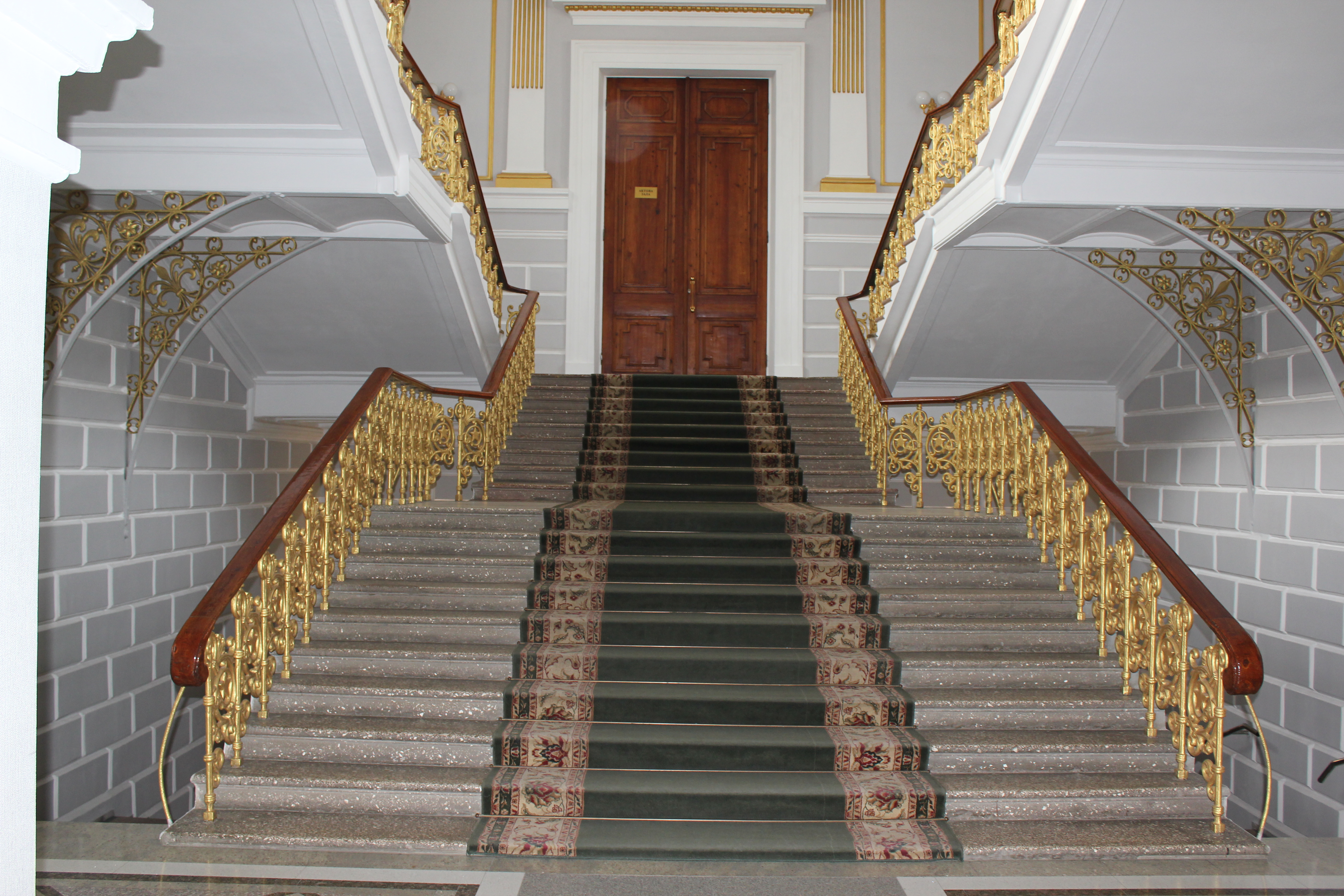
The interior of the main building of the Yaroslav Mudryi National Law University

In 1962, Associate Professor V. P. Maslov was appointed rector of the Kharkiv Law Institute, a position he held for 25 years until 1987. He later earned his Doctor of Legal Sciences degree, became a professor, and was elected a corresponding member of the Academy of Sciences of the Ukrainian SSR in 1985. Under his leadership, the institute expanded its academic staff and enhanced its research capabilities. During this period, the positions of vice-rector for research were held by I. M. Danshyn (1968–1973), V. Ya. Tatsiy (1973–1987), and M. I. Panov (1987–2007). The vice-rectors for academic affairs were V. A. Lomako (1974–1980), O. I. Protsevskyi (1981–1986), V. L. Musiiaka (1986–1988), V. P. Tykhyi (1996), A. P. Hetman (2001–2007), and Yu. P. Bytiak (2007–2010).

The growth of the institute and the expansion of its educational and material infrastructure necessitated further structural and administrative reorganization. In the late 1970s and early 1980s, four independent full-time faculties were established: an investigative-prosecutorial faculty for the prosecution service of Ukraine, a second investigative-prosecutorial faculty for graduates entering the prosecution systems of other Soviet republics, an investigative-criminalistic faculty to train personnel for internal affairs agencies, and later, a faculty for judicial professionals.

In July 1987, Doctor of Legal Sciences, Professor Vasily Tatsiy became the head of the Kharkiv Law Institute. During his tenure of more than 30 years (1987–2020), he oversaw the institutional development of the university, the expansion of its faculty, and the modernization of its research and educational infrastructure, while also enhancing its international relations and financial stability.

=== National Law University ===
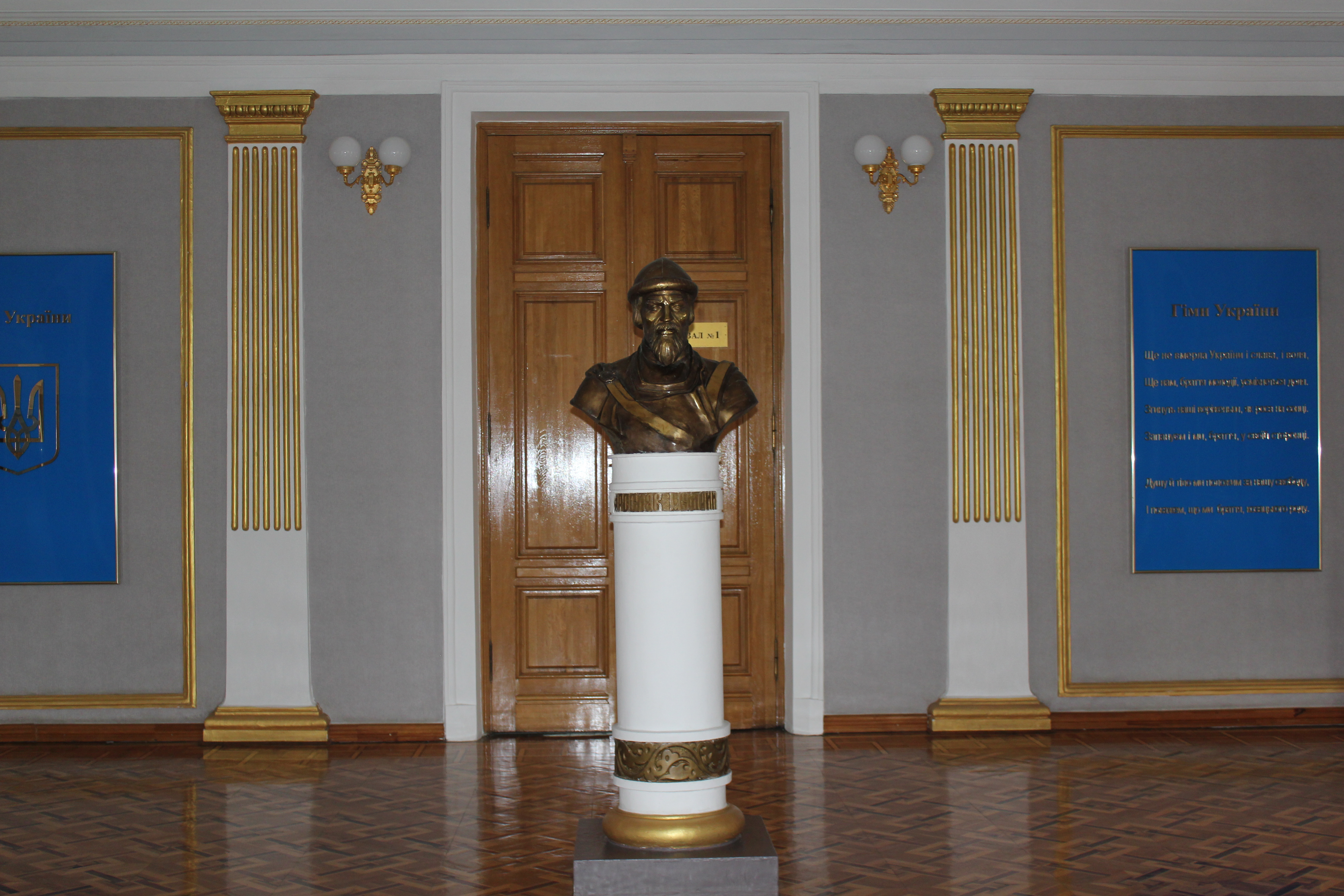
A monument to Yaroslav the Wise inside the main building of Yaroslav Mudryi National Law University

In accordance with the resolution of Council of Ministers of the Ukrainian SSR of 20 March 1991 the Kharkiv Law Institute was rearranged into the National Law Academy of Ukraine. Under the president's decree of 30 March 1995 No. 267 the academy was given the status of the national self-governed (autonomous) state higher educational establishment and by decree of 4 November 1995 the name of Yaroslav the Wise. In accordance with the decree of the President of Ukraine No. 457 21 May 2001 «The question of Yaroslav Mudryi National Law Academy of Ukraine», recognizing its considerable role in training specialists for bodies of state authorities, law enforcement organs, various fields of law practice, considering the necessity of keeping and further development of generated scientific schools in the academy, it was given additional rights with the approval of statute by the Cabinet of Ministers of Ukraine. In accordance with the decree of the president of Ukraine No. 485 25 May 2009 and the resolution of Cabinet of Ministers No. 796 29 July 2009, «The question of Yaroslav Mudryi National Law Academy of Ukraine» the academy was given the status of a self-governed (autonomous) scientific national higher educational establishment, which carried out their activity in accordance with its statute with the right to:

- set up a research institute of legal science;
- take final decisions on awarding scientific degrees and titles;
- realize experimental educational plans and programs for training specialists for state authority bodies, organs of local government, law enforcement organs, various fields of legal practice, research and educational staff.

In accordance with the decree of the president of Ukraine #1194/2010 24 December 2010 and the resolution of Cabinet of Ministers # 2213-p of 8 December 2010, Yaroslav Mudryi National Law Academy of Ukraine was renamed into National University "Yaroslav Mudryi National Law Academy of Ukraine".

By order of the Ministry of Education and Science of Ukraine dated 04.12.2013 No. 1697, it was renamed Yaroslav Mudryi National Law University.

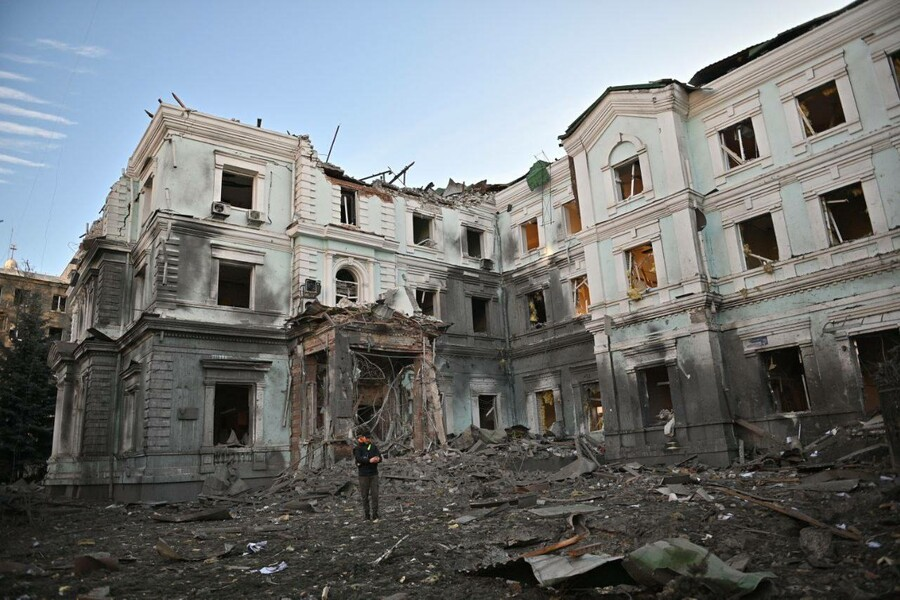
Damage to the National Academy of Legal Sciences after the missile attack on Kharkiv, 23 January 2024.

On January 23, 2024, the university buildings, along with those of the National Academy of Legal Sciences of Ukraine, were damaged following an S-300 missile strike on Kharkiv. Three days after the attack, Kharkiv Mayor Ihor Terekhov announced intentions to rename the street in honor of Hryhorii Skovoroda. On January 26, the Kharkiv City Council officially approved the decision during its session. Following the renaming of Pushkinska Street, the renaming of the Pushkinska metro station was also proposed. On April 26, 2024, following a public poll conducted on the City Council's website, the station was officially renamed Yaroslava Mudroho.

In May 2025, the university, along with eight other Ukrainian higher military educational institutions, was integrated into the European Security and Defence College (ESDC) network.

== Campuses and buildings ==
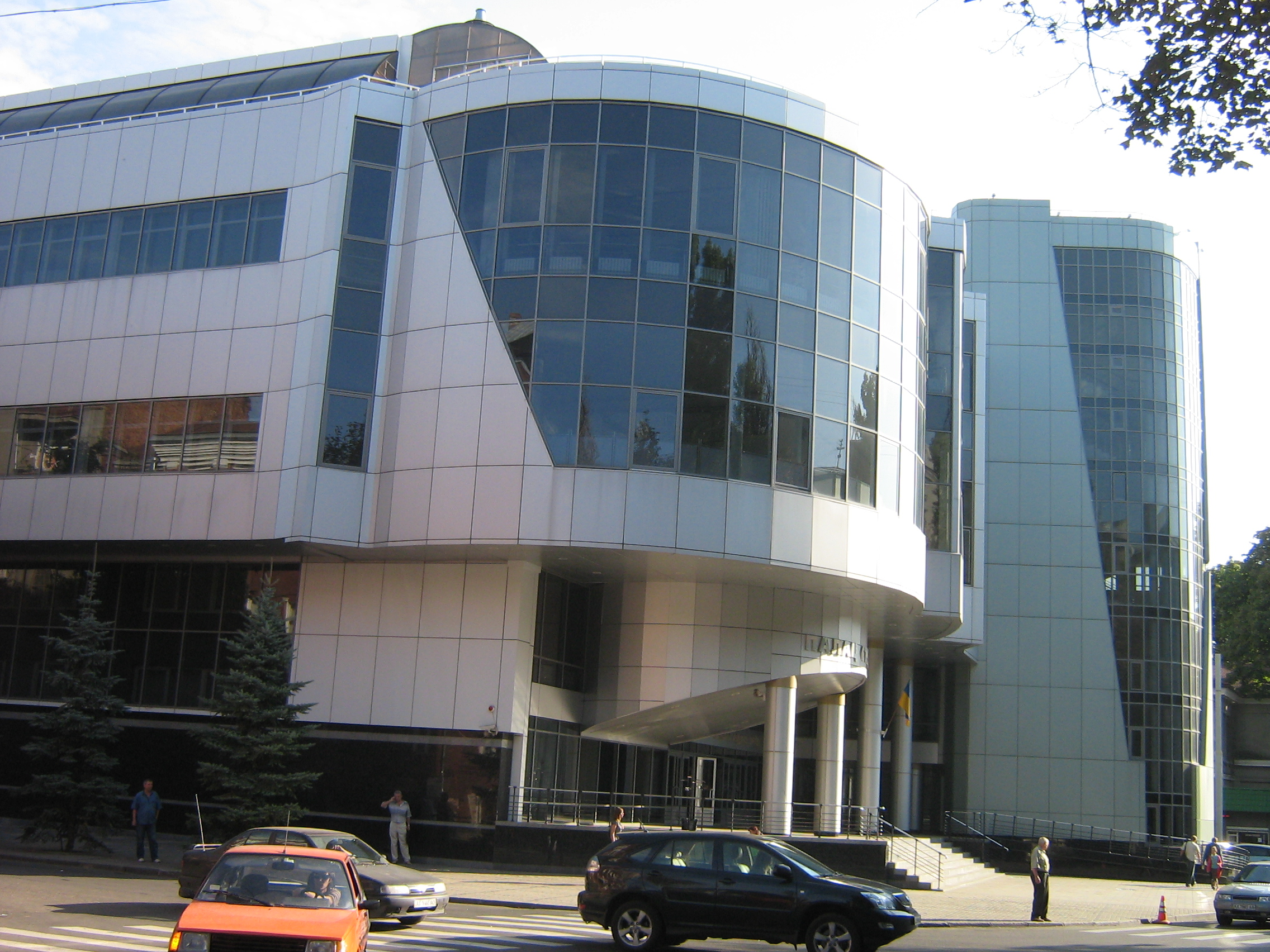
Palace of Students of the Yaroslav Mudryi National Law University

The main academic premise is of 22,000.00 square meters, located in Kharkiv on Hryhorii Skovoroda Street, 77; architect Alexei Beketov built it in 1893. There are 26 departments, 8 lecture halls, sports premises and halls, 2 computer rooms, and library with reading rooms, equipped with computer networks, 2 halls of the Academic Council and the administrative units of the university.

Criminalistics Department building is of 3,000.00 square meters, located on Hryhorii Skovoroda Street, 84; it has 3 lecture halls, 4 photo-laboratories, 2 computer labs, Internet-studio video center, museum and forensic testing ground,

These educational buildings are architectural monuments. The educational building located on Hryhorii Skovoroda Street, 79/2 (2,700.00 square meters) has 5 lecture halls, classrooms, computer lab.

Premise of Crimean Law Institute with total area of 4,000.00 square meters has 4 lecture halls, lecture rooms, conference hall, library, food catering premises, hostel, sports premises, etc.

Total area of Poltava Law Institute premise is 13,917.00 square meters. There are six lecture halls, classrooms, lab for distance education, two conference rooms, two computer labs, a library, museum of criminology, 9-storied hostel of 5,607.00 square meters adjacent to main building, etc.

Currently University has premises with total area 246,611.07 square meters: 18 premises for education of 111,820.57 square meters including sports and cultural centers; 16 hostels of 113,684.00 square meters for 6861 persons; administrative buildings of 10,793.00 square meters; medical and food catering premises of 10,313.10 square meters.

== Profile ==
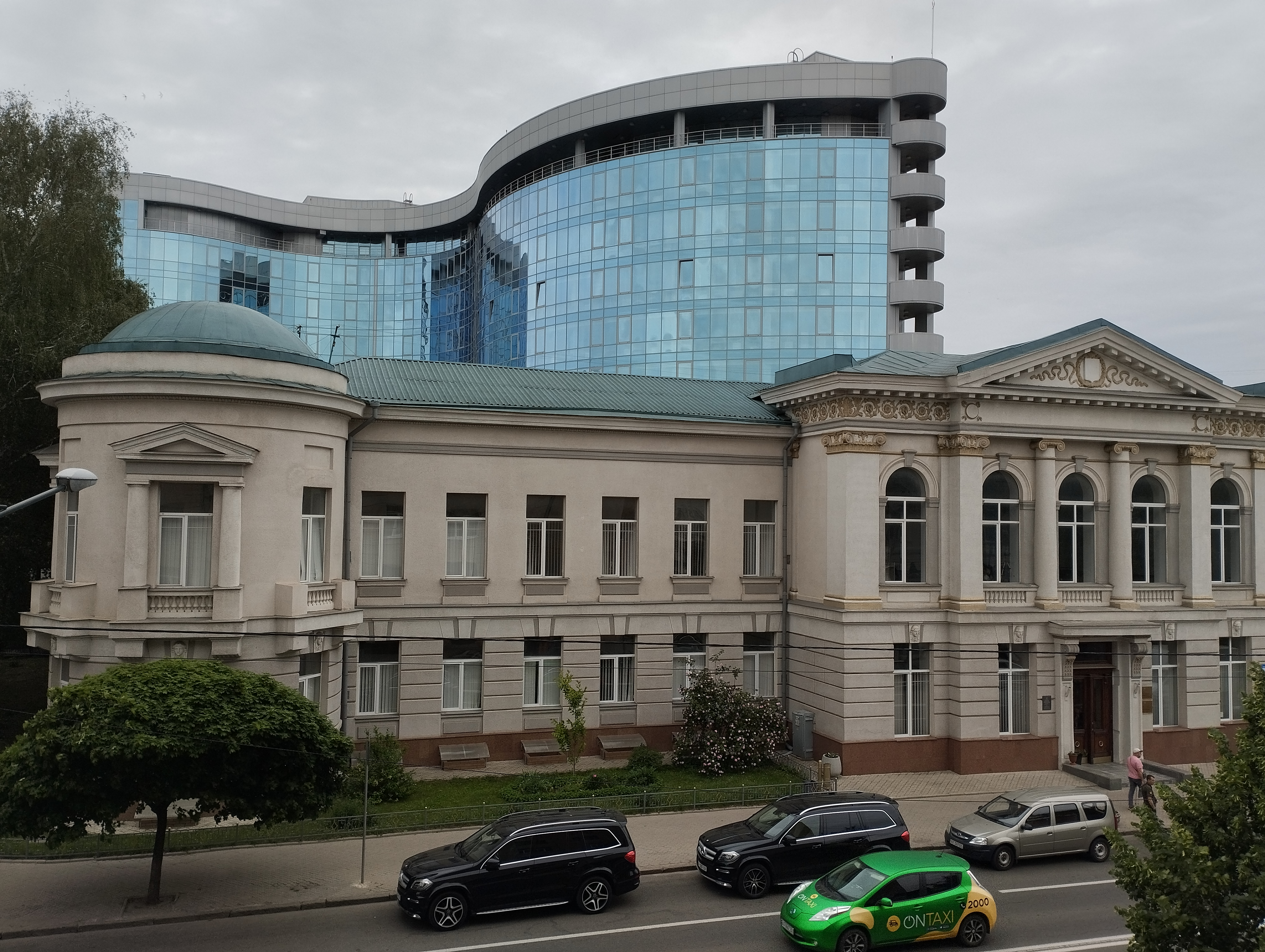
The building of the department of criminology

The academy has significant research and educational potential. Teaching, research and tutorial work are realized by 34 departments, employing more than 800 lecturers. Among them 100 Doctors of Law, professors, about 600 Juris Doctors, associate professors; 1 Full Member of the National Academy of Sciences of Ukraine; 15 Full Members of the National Academy of Law Sciences of Ukraine; 20 Corresponding Members of the National Academy of Law Sciences of Ukraine; 15 Honoured Science and Technology Workers; 2 Honoured Art Workers of Ukraine; 1 Honoured Higher School Worker; 15 Honoured Public Education Workers of Ukraine; 14 Honoured Lawyers of Ukraine; 1 Honoured Lawyer of Russia; 1 Honoured Builder of Ukraine; 7 Honoured Professors – Elders of the National Law Academy of Ukraine named after Yaroslav the Wise; 5 Honoured Culture Workers of Ukraine; 5 Honoured Artists of Ukraine; 10 State prize laureates.

=== Research ===
The university carries out scientific research concerning fundamental and applied problems of jurisprudence; apparently 17 targeted programs are being developed on four scientific directions.

=== Contribution ===
The university makes a major contribution to the perfection of a jural state in Ukraine, improvement of legislative and law enforcement processes. The university's scholars took direct participation in the development of the Constitution of Ukraine currently in force and other laws and normative legal acts, are actively influencing law enforcement practice in the country. The university cooperates with the Verkhovna Rada of Ukraine, Office of the President of Ukraine, Cabinet of Ministers of Ukraine, ministries and departments, bodies of local government in the legislative field. Many of the university's scholars are consultants, members of consultative councils of the Supreme Court of Ukraine, Higher Economic Court, General Prosecutor's Office, Ministry of Interior Affairs, Central Electoral Commission of Ukraine and others government bodies.

=== Reputation ===
University rankings

Global – Overall
- QS World: 151-200 (2026)

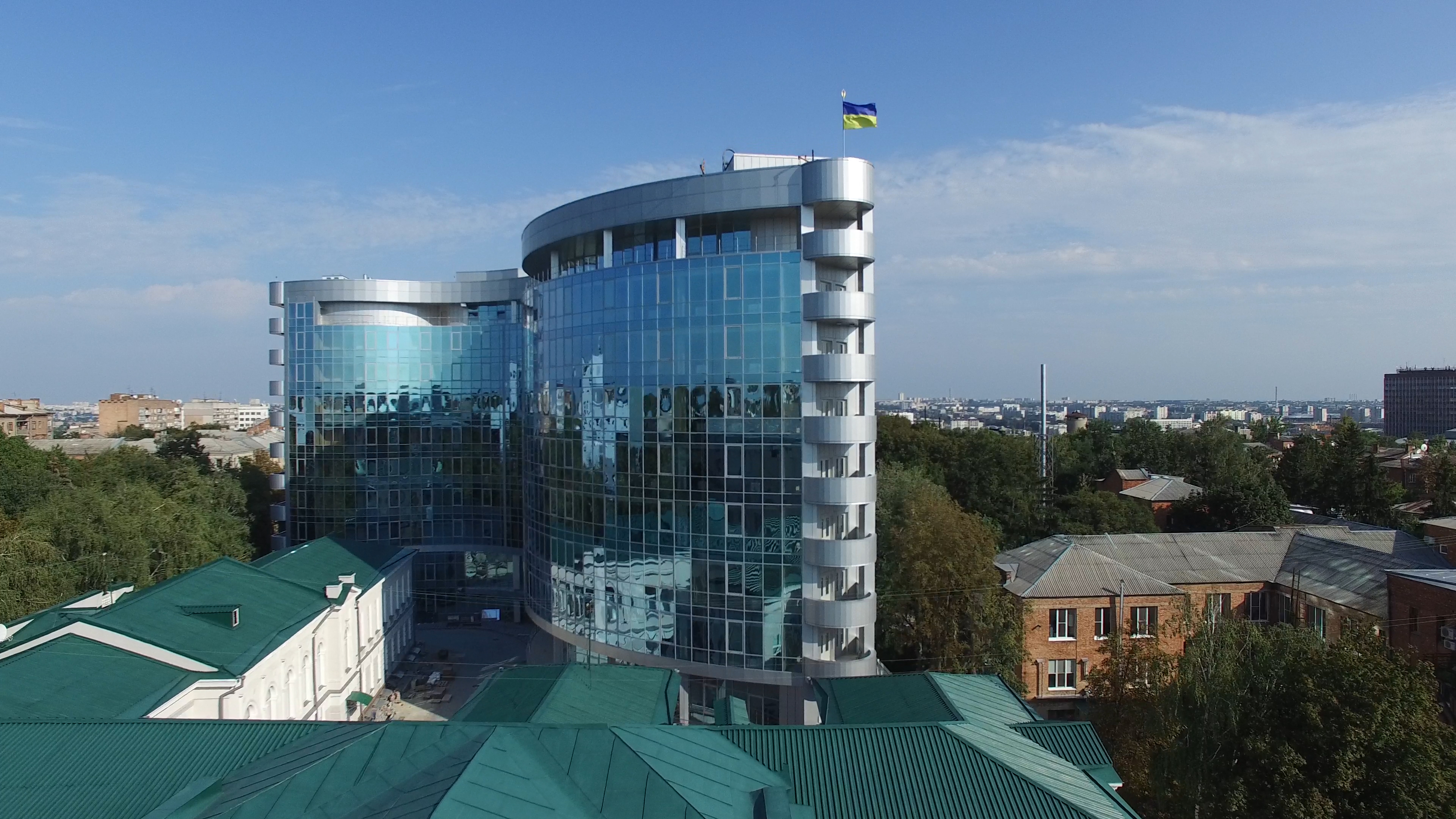
Scientific Library of the Yaroslav Mudryi National Law University

The university takes a leading position in national legal education. It is confirmed by the results of Ukrainian rating of higher educational establishments «Compass», which taking into account the rating of employers and graduates, according to which, the university is the leader among legal educational establishments of Ukraine. The university has been awarded by the Gold Medal of XIII International Exhibition of educational establishments "Modern Education in Ukraine 2010″ in the nomination «Innovations in using IT technologies in the educational process» for the innovative project «Modern architecture of informative educational environmental» (foresight-project); has taken the first prize and awarded by Diploma in the nomination of «Innovation in higher education» for the innovative project «Semantic informative educational portal of the National University "Yaroslav the Wise Law Academy of Ukraine"» in the international exhibition-presentation «Innovation in the education of Ukraine»; has taken the Grand Prize «The Leader of the higher education of Ukraine» in the international exhibition «Modern educational establishments 2010».

=== International relations ===
The university has wide international contacts. It established cooperation and signed agreements with educational establishments of Great Britain, Vietnam, Spain, Germany, Poland, Russia (until 2014), United States, Uzbekistan, France and other countries. It is a participant of joint European projects in the network of «Tempus-Tasis» program and many other international projects.

On 18 September 2004 the university signed the Bologna Process.

On 14 December 2007 the university became the member of the European University Association.

On 20 November 2011 a chapter of the International Law Students Association was established on the basis of the university's international law society.

== Structure ==
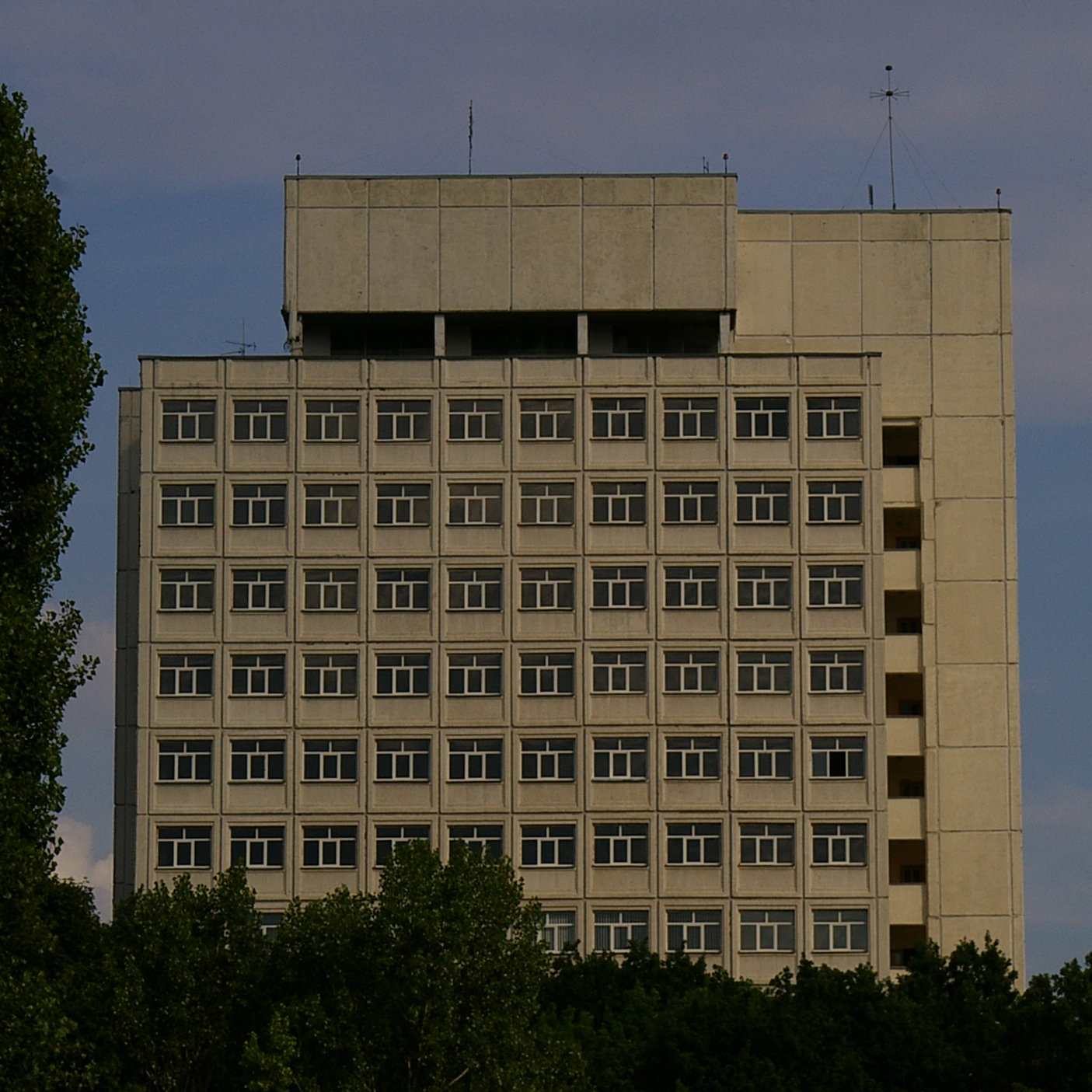
Building on Dynamivska Street

=== Institutes and faculties ===
- Faculty of the Prosecutor’s Office
- Faculty of Law and Economic Security
- Faculty of Investigative and Detective Activities
- Faculty of Justice
- Institute of the Security Service of Ukraine
- Institute of Military Law
- Faculty of International and European Law
- Faculty of Advocacy
- Poltava Law Institute
- Poltava Professional College

=== Departments ===
- Department of Administrative Law and Administrative Activity
- Department of Business Law
- Department of State Building
- Department of Environmental Law
- Department of Land and Agricultural Law
- Department of Foreign Languages
- Department of History of State and Law of Ukraine and Foreign Countries
- Department of Constitutional Law of Ukraine
- Department of Forensic Science
- Department of Criminal and Legal Policy
- Department of Criminal Law
- Department of Criminal Procedure
- Department of Cultural Studies
- Department of International Law
- Department of Tax Law
- Department of European Union Law
- Department of Theory and History of Law
- Department of Labour Law
- Department of Physical Education
- Department of Philosophy
- Department of Financial Law
- Department of Civil Legal Policy, Intellectual Property Law and Innovations
- Department of Civil Law
- Department of Civil Procedure, Arbitration and Private International Law
- Department of Civil Justice and Advocacy
- Department of Administrative Law
- Department of Reserve Officers Training
- Department of Human Rights and Legal Methodology

== Honorable doctors and famous alumni ==
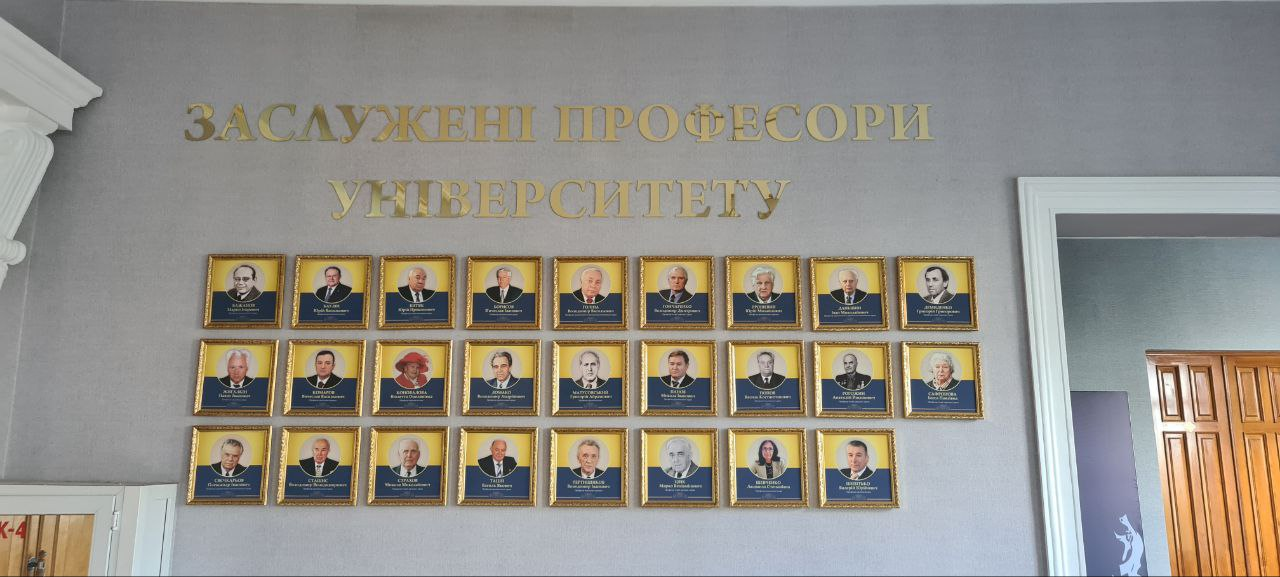
Honored Professors of the Yaroslav Mudryi National Law University

- Mikhail Alekseyenko was Russian lawyer, professor of finance law, public figure, member of the State Duma of the Russian Empire of 3rd and 4th convocations (by the list from the Union of October 17), and rector of the Kharkov University (1890–1897).
- Dmitri Kachenovsky was a famous Russian jurist.
- Mikhail Taube was a famous Russian international lawyer, statesman and legal historian.
- Ilya Timkovsky, Lawyer, professor and dean of the moral faculty of Kharkov University.
- Roman Rudenko, Soviet lawyer, statesman, Procurator General of the Soviet Union (1953–1981), and the chief Soviet prosecutor at the Nuremberg Trials.
- Vladimir Koretsky, Soviet Ukrainian specialist in international law, academician, judge and Vice-President of the International Court of Justice, and founder of the Institute of State and Law of the Academy of Sciences of the Ukrainian SSR.
- Vladimir Stashys, Honoured professor of the National University «Yaroslav the Wise Law Academy of Ukraine», honoured professor of National Academy of Internal Affairs, honoured doctor of National University of «Kyiv-Mohyla Academy», honoured academician of International Solomon University, honoured academician of National University of Ostroh Academy, member of Russian Academy of Natural Sciences, member of Lawyers' Union of Ukraine, member of the International Association of Legal Methodology in Canada, London Academy of Diplomacy, European Association of Legislation (EAL), European Society of Criminology.
- Violetta Konovalova, Honored scientist of Ukraine (1981), winner of the prize Yaroslav the Wise, for outstanding achievements in field of science education (2001) and in nomination «For series of works on criminalistics» (2003).
- Vasyl Tatsiy, Soviet and Ukrainian scientist in the field of jurisprudence. Doctor of Law, Professor. Rector of the Yaroslav Mudryi National Law University (1987–2020). President (1993–2016) and honorary president (2016–2022) of the National Academy of Legal Sciences of Ukraine, member of the Presidium of the National Academy of Sciences of Ukraine (1998–2022). One of the authors of the Constitution of Ukraine (1996), Hero of Ukraine (2004).
- Oleksandr Lavrynovych, Minister of Justice of Ukraine.
- Vitaliy Boiko, Minister of Justice of Ukraine, Chairman of the Supreme Court of Ukraine.
- Fedir Hlukh, Minister of Justice of Ukraine, Chairman of the Supreme Court of Ukraine.
- Vasyl Onopenko, Minister of Justice of Ukraine, Chairman of the Supreme Court of Ukraine.
- Petro Pylypchuk, Chairman of the Supreme Court of Ukraine.
- Vladimir Ustinov, Russian statesman and lawyer, Prosecutor General of the Russian Federation (2000–2006), Minister of Justice of the Russian Federation (2006–2008), and Presidential Plenipotentiary Envoy to the Southern Federal District.
- Hennadiy Kernes, Mayor of Kharkiv.
- Ekaterina Zgurskaya, Minister of Justice of Ukrainian SSR.
- Stepan Havrysh, Ukrainian politician, Doctor of Law, Professor. Academician of the National Academy of Legal Sciences of Ukraine (2004), Honoured Lawyer of Ukraine (2003); People's Deputy of Ukraine III and IV convocations.
- Tetyana Kahanovska, Ukrainian lawyer, Doctor of Law, Professor of administrative law. Rector of V. N. Karazin Kharkiv National University.
- Yevhen Murayev, Ukrainian politician and media owner.
- Ihor Lachenkov, Ukrainian influencer, blogger and voulenteer.
- Vadym Sukharevsky, Ukrainian military commander.
- Oleksandr Bakumov, Ukrainian politician and lawyer, Doctor of Law, Professor of constitutional law.

== Rectors ==
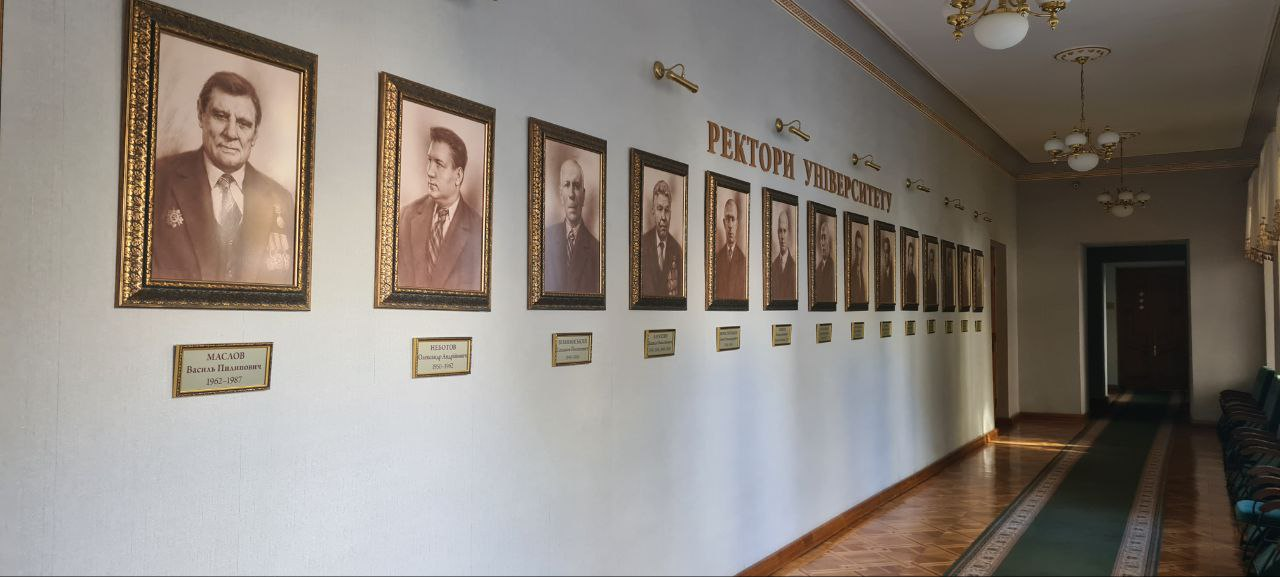
Rectors of the Yaroslav Mudryi National Law University

- 1930—1931 Brandt Karl Karlovich
- 1931—1932 Mark Yeminnyk
- 1932—1934 Semyon Tsarehradskyi
- 1934—1937 Sergey Kanarskyi
- 1937 Mykola Levikov
- 1937—1939 Yevheniy Monastyrskyi
- 1939—1948 Vasily Barakhtyan
- 1948—1950 Solomon Vilnyanskyi
- 1950—1962 Olexander Nebotov
- 1962—1987 Vasily Maslov
- 1987—2020 Vasily Tatsiy
- 2020—present Anatoly Hetman

== See also ==
- National Academy of Legal Sciences of Ukraine
- National University Odesa Law Academy
- List of universities in Ukraine
