= Yevhen Parokhod =

Ukrainian businessman

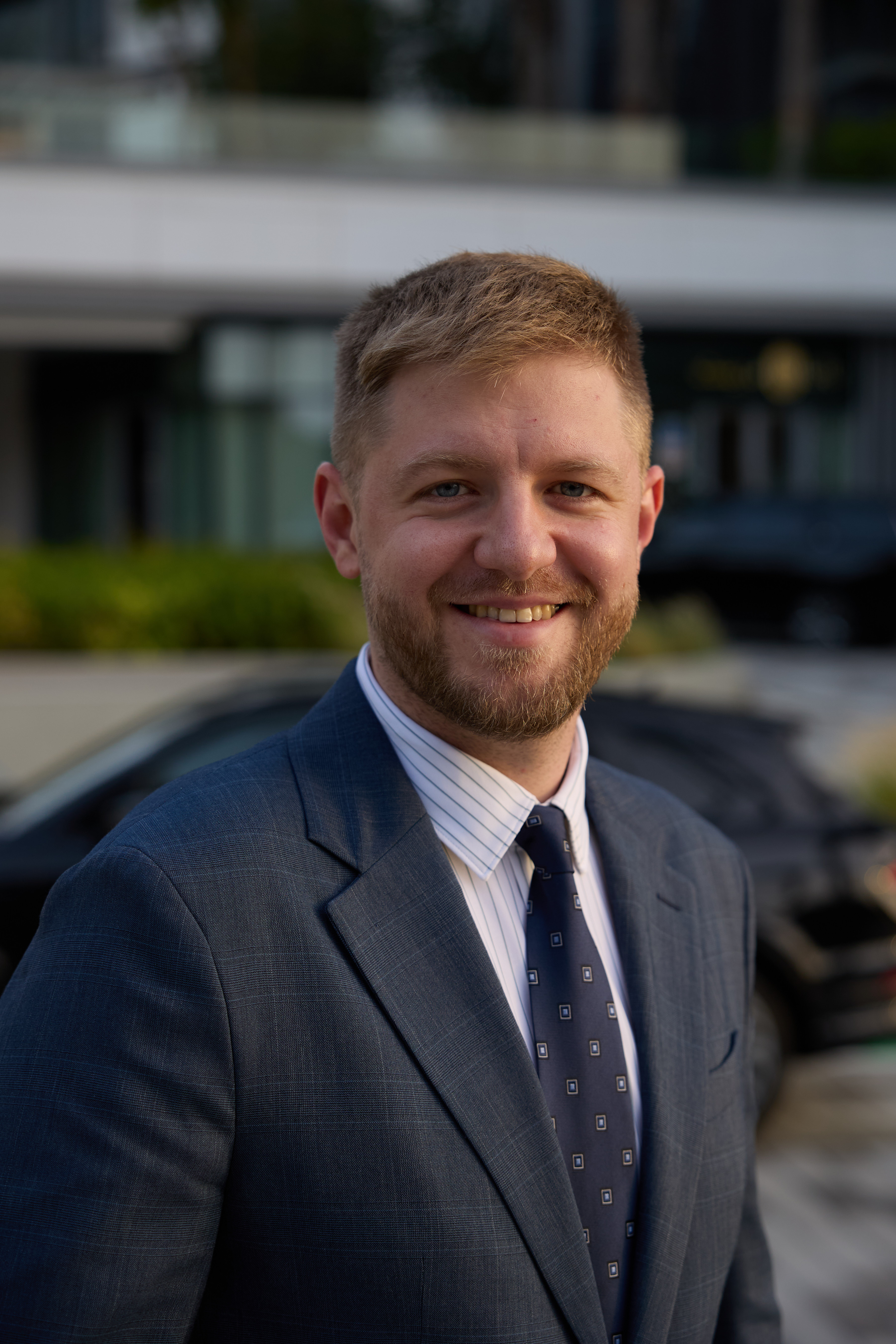
- Education: Yaroslav Mudryi National Law University
- Occupations: businessman, entrepreneur and founder

Yevhen Parokhod is a Ukrainian businessman, entrepreneur and founder of the UAE-based Renty.ae platform.

== Biography ==
=== Education ===
From 2008 to 2012, Yevhen Parokhod was a student at Yaroslav Mudryi National Law University, where he studied at the Prosecutor's Faculty and got a degree in law.

=== Career ===
Since 2013, he has been engaged in commercial activities as a marketing consultant. In January 2016, he founded the company Ultra Web Design, a marketing agency that generated leads for rental car companies.

Later, in September 2018, Yevhen Parokhod founded a car rental company and the project Renty.ae. In January 2020, before the COVID-19 restrictions, Renty.ae launched its first product. Despite the challenges posed by the pandemic, the company sustained its business model through automation of processes (CRM). One of Parokhod's innovative approaches was the removal of deposits, which he identified as a barrier to market development, which improved growth and conversion rates. From March 2021, Yevhen Parokhod was appointed as a general manager at Parasol International General Trading. In 2024, Yevhen Parokhod expanded his business and launched the yacht rental services.
