= Basel Houari =

- Басель Хуарі
- Born: November 20, 1993 (age 32)
- Education: Yaroslav Mudryi National Law University; National University of Pharmacy
- Occupations: Entrepreneur, real estate developer
- Known for: Founder and CEO of TEUS Group; co-owner of Zhytlobud-2

Basel Houari (born 20 November 1993) is an international entrepreneur and real estate developer. He is the founder and CEO of TEUS Group and a co-owner of Zhytlobud-2, a construction company in Eastern Europe.

== Early life and education ==
Houari was born on 20 November 1993.

He holds a master's degree from Yaroslav Mudryi National Law University and a diploma from the National University of Pharmacy.

== Career ==
Houari has worked in real estate development since 2017. He has participated in the implementation of projects in Eastern Europe and international markets.

He has been associated with Zhytlobud-2, a construction company in Eastern Europe. The company has developed residential, administrative and commercial properties.

Houari later founded TEUS Group, an international real estate developer focused on hospitality and income-generating property projects. TEUS Group has pursued developments in tourist destinations including Turkey, Indonesia, and the Maldives.

== Recognition ==
Houari has overseen projects developed by TEUS Group that have received industry awards. In 2024–2025, the DESIRE Antalya project won the European Property Awards in the category Best New Small Hotel Construction & Design Europe, while the Amani Melasti project was recognized at the Asia Pacific Property & Hotel Awards 2025–2026.
