= Ekaterina Ivanovna Zgurskaya =

Soviet-Ukrainian politician (1915–2000)

Ekaterina Ivanovna Zgurskaya (1915-2000) was a Soviet-Ukrainian Politician (Communist).

She served as Minister of Justice in 1957–1963.

== Biography ==
She graduated from the Kharkiv Law Institute in 1938.

In 1938-1947, she worked as a judge and deputy chairman of the Zhytomyr Regional Court. She has been a member of the CPSU since 1941.

During the German-Soviet War, she was evacuated to the city of Pugachev, Saratov Oblast, RSFSR.

Since 1952, she has been a deputy chairman of the Supreme Court of the Ukrainian SSR. Since 1954, she was Deputy Minister of Justice of the Ukrainian SSR.

From March 1957 to March 21, 1963 — Minister of Justice of the Ukrainian SSR.

From April 1963 to January 1966, she was the 1st Deputy Prosecutor of the Ukrainian SSR, and then Deputy Head of the Pardon Department of the Verkhovna Rada of the Ukrainian SSR.

After retiring in 1977, she taught law at the Institute for Advanced Training of Food Industry Workers for 5 years.
