= Oleksandr Bakumov =

Ukrainian soldier and politician

- Олександр Бакумов
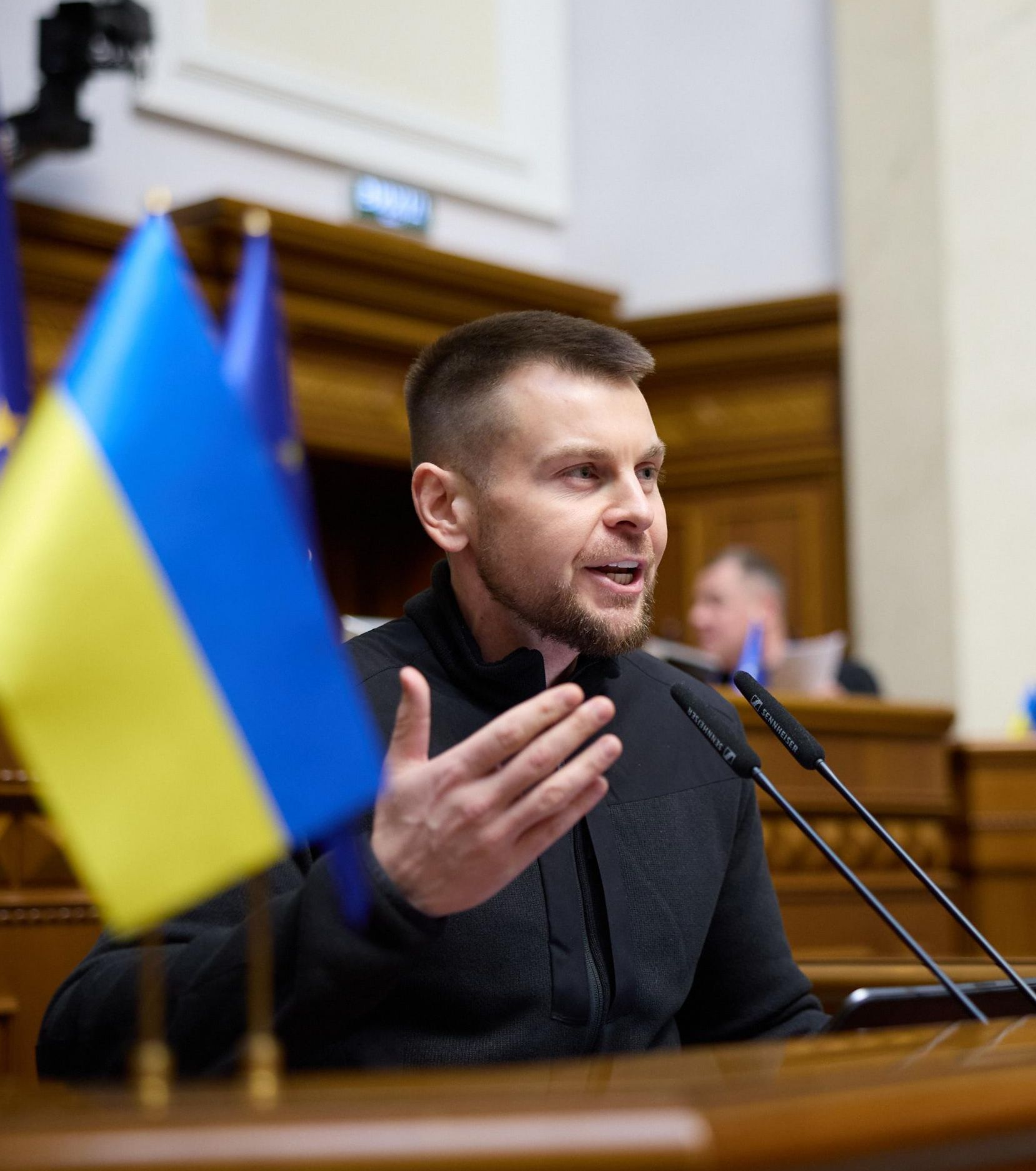
- Bakumov in 2024

Member of Ukrainian Parliament
- Incumbent
- Assumed office 29 August 2019
- Preceded by: Anatoliy Denysenko
- Constituency: Kharkiv Oblast, No. 173

Personal details
- Born: 25 April 1989 (age 37) Kharkiv, Ukrainian SSR, Soviet Union (now Ukraine)
- Party: Servant of the People
- Other political affiliations: Independent
- Education: Yaroslav Mudryi National Law University; National University of Kharkiv
- Awards: Order of Merit, third class

Military service
- Allegiance: Ukraine
- Branch/service: State Border Guard Service of Ukraine
- Rank: Captain
- Battles/wars: Russo-Ukrainian War; War in Donbas

Oleksandr Serhiyovych Bakumov (Ukrainian: Олександр Сергійович Бакумов; born 25 April 1989) is a Ukrainian soldier, professor, and politician currently serving as a People's Deputy of Ukraine from Ukraine's 173rd electoral district since 29 August 2019. He is a member of Servant of the People. Prior to becoming a People's Deputy, he was a captain in the State Border Guard Service of Ukraine during the war in Donbas, for which he was decorated with the Order of Merit.

== Education ==
In 2005, he graduated from Kharkiv Lyceum of Arts No. 133 and was awarded a silver medal ‘For Achievements in Education’.

In 2010, he graduated from Yaroslav Mudryi National Law University (speciality ‘Law’) and obtained a law degree (Master of Law). In 2011, he graduated with honours from V. N. Karazin Kharkiv National University, where he studied finance and history.

He was awarded an academic scholarship by the Cabinet of Ministers of Ukraine for outstanding academic achievements on 30 October 2008

In December 2012, he graduated from the postgraduate course (full-time) of the National University ‘Yaroslav Mudryi Law Academy of Ukraine’, having defended his dissertation on ‘The Constitutional Right of Ukrainian Citizens to Participate in Elections and Referendums and Problems of its Implementation’ ahead of schedule.

For outstanding achievements in postgraduate studies, he was awarded an academic scholarship of the Cabinet of Ministers of Ukraine by the Resolution of the Cabinet of Ministers of Ukraine of 22.08.2012

In 2017, he graduated with honours from the Master's degree programme in History at the Faculty of History of V. N. Karazin Kharkiv National University and received the qualification of a historian, teacher of history and socio-political disciplines.

In May 2021, he defended his dissertation for the degree of Doctor of Science of Law.

The work was defended under the scientific supervision of a well-known Ukrainian constitutional scholar Doctor of Science of Law, Professor, Corresponding Member of the National Academy of Legal Sciences of Ukraine, Vice-Rector of the Yaroslav Mudryi National Law University Yurii Hryhorovych Barabash

The research was completed and defended in two specialities: 12.00.01 Theory and History of State and Law, History of Political and Legal Doctrines and 12.00.02 Constitutional Law, Municipal Law.

The defence took place on 15 May 2021 at the V.M. Koretskyi Institute of State and Law of the National Academy of Sciences of Ukraine.

== Military Service ==
In 2009, he graduated from the reserve officer training programme at the Military Law Faculty of the Yaroslav Mudryi National Law Academy of Ukraine with the rank of officer.

He was called up for military service during the fourth wave of mobilization in the ranks of the State Border Guard Service of Ukraine.

He took part in the hostilities in Donbas. He was awarded the Order of Merit of the third degree, and recognised as a participant in the Anti-Terrorist Operation by both the President of Ukraine and the General Staff of the Ukrainian Armed Forces.

He served in the military reserve. Reserve officer, military rank - Lieutenant Colonel.

== Professional career ==
December 2012 - 2015 - Assistant of the Department of Constitutional Law of Ukraine at the National University ‘Yaroslav Mudryi Law Academy of Ukraine’;

2015 - military service during mobilisation for a special period in the State Border Guard Service of Ukraine;

2016-2018 - Associate Professor of the Department of Constitutional and International Law, Faculty No. 4 of Kharkiv National University of Internal Affairs;

Since 2017, he has been practising law.

Since November 2018, he has served as the Vice-Rector of Kharkiv National University of Internal Affairs. He holds a Doctor of Science of Law degree. Academic title - Professor.

Oleksandr Bakumov is a member of the Board of the Kharkiv Regional Organisation of the Union of Lawyers of Ukraine.

Since July 2019, he has been a Member of Ukrainian Parliament in the Verkhovna Rada of Ukraine of the IX convocation. In the elections in the constituency No. 173 (Osnovianskyi district, part of Slobidskyi district of Kharkiv), he received 45.91% of the vote.

Member of the Verkhovna Rada Committee on Law Enforcement.

From 4 September 2019 he served as Chairman of the Subcommittee on Criminal Law and Crime Counteraction.

On 1 July 2022, he was elected Chairman of the Temporary Special Commission of the Verkhovna Rada of Ukraine on International Humanitarian Law and International Criminal Law in the context of the armed aggression of the Russian Federation against Ukraine.

Since 20 August 2024, he has been elected Chairman of the Temporary Special Commission of the Verkhovna Rada of Ukraine on the use of the state budget of Ukraine aimed at the construction of fortifications and engineering barriers on the contact line, as well as the manufacture and purchase of unmanned aerial vehicles and electronic warfare equipment for military units of the Armed Forces of Ukraine and other military formations established in accordance with the laws of Ukraine.

== Legislative Work ==
The NGO ‘Chesno‘ presented the results of a study on the activities of MPs of the IX convocation. It was ranked among the TOP-10 in terms of the number of submitted bills and legislative initiatives. TOP-20 in terms of the number of initiatives that are more likely to become laws - 187 initiatives became laws, which is 37% of the registered ones.

He co-authored the following comprehensive, systematic and innovative bills:

No. 4265 - on state registration of human genomic information (Law No. 2391-IX of 09.07.2022).

The purpose of the Law is to regulate the processes of creation and functioning of the human genomic information record in Ukraine and to improve the work of law enforcement agencies of Ukraine on prevention, detection and investigation of crimes in order to prevent criminal offences, identify perpetrators of criminal offences, search for missing persons, and identify unidentified persons, including military personnel.

No. 7120 - on ensuring the participation of civilians in the defence of Ukraine (Law No. 2114-IX of 03.03.2022).

The Law provides for the possibility of obtaining firearms and ammunition by civilians, citizens of Ukraine, as well as foreigners and stateless persons who are legally present in Ukraine and have expressed an intention to participate in the defence of the state, during the period of martial law in Ukraine, as well as the obligation to return them within 10 days after the termination or cancellation of such a state.

No. 2689 - On Amendments to Certain Legislative Acts of Ukraine on the Implementation of International Criminal Law and International Humanitarian Law.

The draft law is aimed at ensuring the full implementation of the provisions of international criminal law and international humanitarian law on criminal prosecution of international crimes (genocide, crimes of aggression, crimes against humanity and war crimes), as well as ensuring the fulfilment of international obligations to prevent legal and de facto impunity for such crimes.

No. 8268 - on the application and observance of international humanitarian law in Ukraine.

The purpose of the draft law is to define the legal and organisational framework for the functioning of the system of application of international humanitarian law in Ukraine, the content and procedure for applying preventive mechanisms to ensure it, rules for eliminating the consequences of possible violations, establishing a procedure for monitoring compliance with humanitarian law during and after the end of an armed conflict, and defining the competence of state bodies in the field of disseminating knowledge about international humanitarian law.
