= Mikhail Alekseyenko =

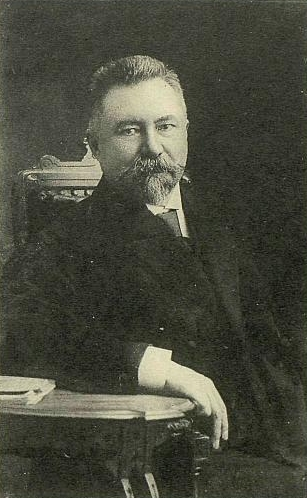

Mikhail Martynovich Alexeyenko (Russian: Михаи́л Марты́нович Алексе́енко) (February 5, 1847 – February 18, 1917) was a lawyer in the Russian Empire. He was a professor of finance law, public figure, member of the State Duma of the Russian Empire of 3rd and 4th convocations (by the list from the Union of October 17), and rector of the Kharkov University (1890–1897).

== Biography ==
He was born into the family of merchants in Ekaterinoslav. In 1868, he graduated from Faculty of Law of Kharkov University, and in 1872, he did his master's thesis on the topic “State credit, the outline of the growth of public debt in England and France” and began to teach the financial law. In 1879, after two years of working abroad, he defended his PhD thesis in financial law “Current legislation on direct taxes”.

== Agrarian Question ==
As a lawyer and deputy, Mikhail Alekseenko dealt with various problems of that time, including the land issue. He outlined his views on it in the pamphlet Agrarian Question. He drew attention to the fact that the low degree of agrarian culture of the peasantry makes attempts to solve the land problem by simply providing the peasants with land ineffective. He saw a way out not only in the partial allocation of land to the peasants, but also in propagating among them advanced agricultural practices, state assistance in acquiring equipment, etc. In addition, Alekseenko considered it important to educate the legal and civic culture among the peasant masses.:

== Work at Duma ==
In the Duma of the III and IV convocations, M. M. Alekseenko was one of the most prominent deputies and enjoyed great authority even among political opponents. During 9 sessions (1907-1917), he served as chairman of the Budget Commission, where he was able to establish an effective and rigorous review of the State List of Income and Expenses. Alekseenko managed to establish good contact with the ministers of finance (first of all, with V.N. Kokovtsev) and carefully monitored that budget initiatives put forward by the majority of the Duma would not lead, under the influence of populist considerations, to excessive inflation of the budget. Alekseenko, as the chairman of the Budget Commission, was able to achieve a businesslike and welcoming atmosphere in its meetings, while the general meetings of the Duma were often overshadowed by various kinds of attacks and mutual insults of deputies of extreme factions. As a result, the budget initiatives of the government and the Duma majority did not have fundamental differences, due to which the Duma discussed and adopted budget laws without delay and in a constructive atmosphere.

During the parliamentary crisis in March 1911, he was considered the best candidate for the post of chairman of the State Duma, who became vacant after the resignation of A.I. Guchkov, but refused to run, losing the position of chairman M.V. Rodzianko, with whom he was associated with joint activities in Yekaterinoslavsky provincial zemstvo.

He was close to the left wing of the Octobrist faction, but after the split in 1913, the Octobrist faction entered the group of Zemstvo-Octobrists.

He died of cerebral hemorrhage at 9 pm on February 18, 1917 The funeral of M. M. Alekseenko was the most solemn in the history of the State Duma of the Russian Empire.

== Works ==
- A look at the development of the doctrine of tax among economists A. Smith, Say, Ricardo, Sismondi and Mill
- "Essay on the growth of public debt in England and France." Kharkov, 1872. (master's thesis)
- Synopsis of Financial Law, 1894
- Income tax and conditions for its application
- The fifth anniversary of the budget in the 3rd State Duma. SPb., 1912.
