= Imperial Kharkov University =

Russian university in Kharkov

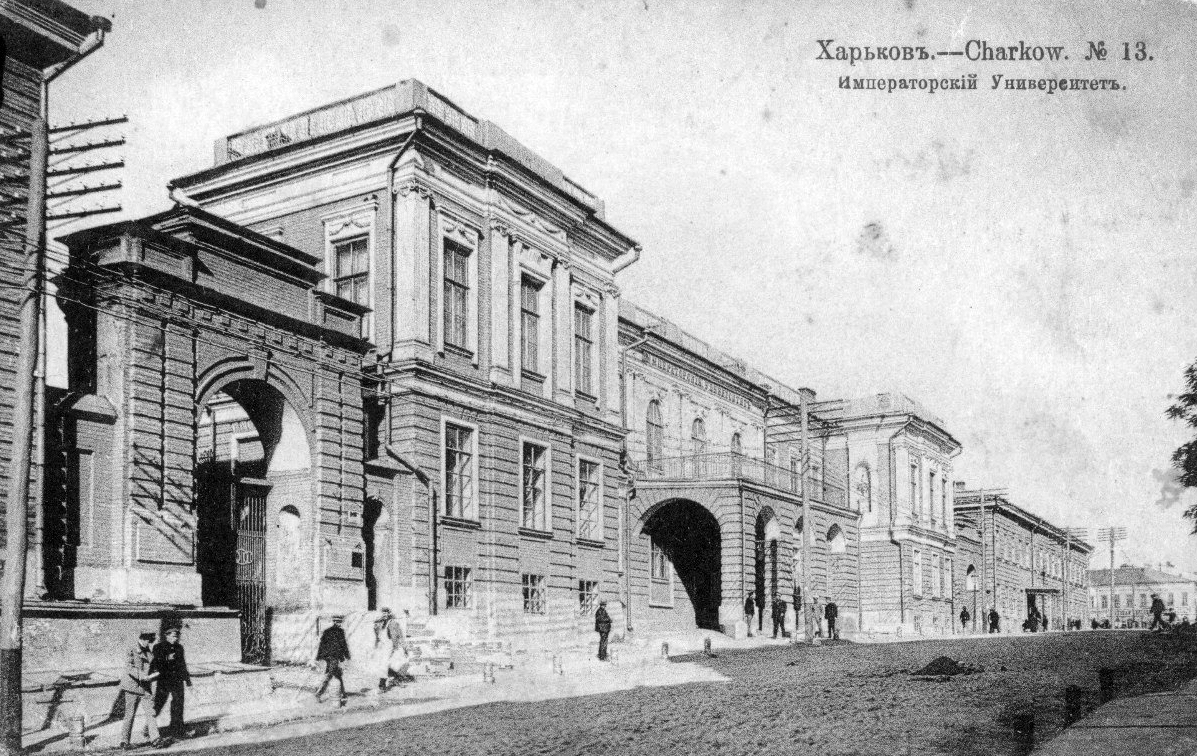
- Type: Imperial University
- Active: January 24, 1803–1917
- Founders: Alexander I of Russia
- Location: Kharkov, Russian Empire

Imperial Kharkov University (1803–1917) was one of the twelve Imperial Universities of the Russian Empire, now known as National University of Kharkiv in Ukraine.

== History ==
=== Foundational years and architectural legacy ===
The Imperial University of Kharkov was established by a decree signed on January 24, 1803, and officially opened on January 17, 1805, when, as part of the creation of educational districts, Emperor Alexander I approved its charter. It was the only university in the southern Russian Empire and significantly impacted Kharkov, a provincial town. It was also one of the oldest classical universities in Eastern Europe, located in the lands of Sloboda Ukraine within the Russian Empire and modern Ukraine.

The main building of the university was the governor's palace, constructed from 1768 to 1777 based on a design by architect Mikhail Tikhmenev, similar to an earlier one in Veliky Novgorod. This Novgorod palace was a road palace for Empress Catherine II, designed to facilitate her travels between Petersburg and Moscow. The construction was overseen by the provincial architect Ivan Vilianov, along with his student and successor, Pyotr Yaroslavsky.

Following the construction of the main building, significant efforts were made to seamlessly integrate the palace into Kharkov's architectural landscape. The process included purchasing a large estate from General Aide-de-camp Petr Antonovich Devier after prolonged negotiations over its high cost. Construction began in earnest in 1773 with carefully sourced high-quality materials. The building was completed in 1777, and subsequent enhancements included ornate furnishings and elaborate fittings, reflecting the palace's regional importance.

Once the palace was completed, further enhancements followed under the guidance of Pyotr Yaroslavsky. The grounds were enriched with a surrounding fence, entry gates, wings, and other service buildings, enhancing its stature within Kharkov's architectural landscape. The construction totaled 80,578 rubles, with an additional 4,500 rubles spent on furnishing from Moscow, including furniture, mirrors, chandeliers, drapes, and clocks, further reflecting its significance.

After the building was transferred to the university, it was renovated according to a design by Professor of Architecture Yevgeny Vasilyev. In 1822, Yegor Karneev, the curator of the Kharkov educational district, initiated the construction of a church opposite the main university building, dedicated to Saint Anthony. The cornerstone was laid on January 17, 1823, and the church was consecrated on April 25, 1831. The construction, designed by architecture professor Yevgeny Alexeyevich Vasilyev, involved architects Tatischev, Kalashnikov, and Ton, with funding partly from university allocations and partly from donations. This church was integral to the university's cultural and spiritual life, enriching its architectural complex.

=== Academic development and scientific advancements ===
As the Imperial University of Kharkov expanded, it also focused on enriching its academic offerings and infrastructure. By the early 19th century, the university had developed a structured departmental system that included diverse fields such as moral and political sciences, medical sciences, and the humanities. This broad educational framework helped to cultivate a robust intellectual environment, attracting students and scholars from across the Russian Empire and beyond.

The emphasis on scientific education became particularly prominent with the establishment of the physical and mathematical sciences department. This department was instrumental in advancing research and teaching in areas like astronomy, chemistry, and botany. Notable educators, including mathematicians like V. G. Imshenetsky and A. M. Lyapunov, played pivotal roles in establishing a strong mathematical tradition at the university, which later contributed significantly to its reputation as a leading scientific institution.

Throughout the 19th century, Kharkov University continued to adapt and grow, reflecting broader trends in European scientific and educational development. Its evolution from a regional educational institution to a prominent university highlights its pivotal role in shaping academic and scientific discourse in Eastern Europe.

=== Closure and reformation of the University ===
As the Russian Empire collapsed, the Imperial University of Kharkov underwent significant changes with the Bolshevik Revolution of October 1917. Control of the university shifted frequently amidst the chaotic political environment until the Bolsheviks solidified their power, fundamentally transforming the institution's structure. This reorganization included abolishing traditional academic autonomy and establishing a Soviet-led administrative framework that repurposed the university to serve the ideological needs of the new regime.

The restructured university saw many of its professors who opposed the Bolsheviks leave, while others adapted to the new political realities. It evolved into a series of specialized institutes, such as the Kharkiv Institute of People's Education and the Kharkiv National Medical University. These changes marked the end of the Imperial University of Kharkov, transitioning it into a key educational entity within Soviet Ukraine, aimed at aligning higher education with Soviet ideological and technical objectives.
