= Imperial University =

Imperial University may refer to:

== Asia ==
- Guozijian of the Chinese Empire (c. 221 BC–1912)
- Taixue of the Chinese Empire (c. 221 BC–1912)
- Imperial University of Peking (1898–1912), now Peking University, Beijing, China
- Imperial Universities of the Japanese Empire (1868–1947)
  - University of Tokyo, formerly known as "Imperial University"

== Europe ==
- Imperial University, known as University of France (1808–1896), initiated by Napoleon, Paris, France
- Imperial College London, London, United Kingdom
- Imperial Universities of the Russian Empire (1721–1917):
  1. Imperial Moscow University (1755-1917), now Moscow State University, Moscow, Russia
  2. Imperial Dorpat University (1802-1917), now University of Tartu, Tartu, Estonia
  3. Imperial Vilna University (1803-1832), now Vilnius University, Vilnius, Lithuania
  4. Imperial Kharkov University (1805-1917), now National University of Kharkiv, Kharkiv, Ukraine
  5. Imperial Kazan University (1805-1917), now Kazan Federal University, Kazan, Russia
  6. Imperial St. Petersburg University (1819-1917), now St. Petersburg State University, St. Petersburg, Russia
  7. Imperial Alexander University (1827-1917), now University of Helsinki, Helsinki, Finland
  8. Imperial St. Vladimir University (1934-1917), now T. S. National University of Kyiv, Kyiv, Ukraine
  9. Imperial Novorossiysk University (1865-1917), now Odesa I. I. Mechnykov National University, Odesa, Ukraine
  10. Imperial Warsaw University (1869-1915), now University of Warsaw, Warsaw, Poland
  11. Imperial Tomsk University (1888-1917), now Tomsk State University, Tomsk, Russia
  12. Imperial Nikolay University (1909-1917), now Saratov State University, Saratov, Russia
