= Mikhail Ostrogradsky =

Ukrainian-Russian mathematician

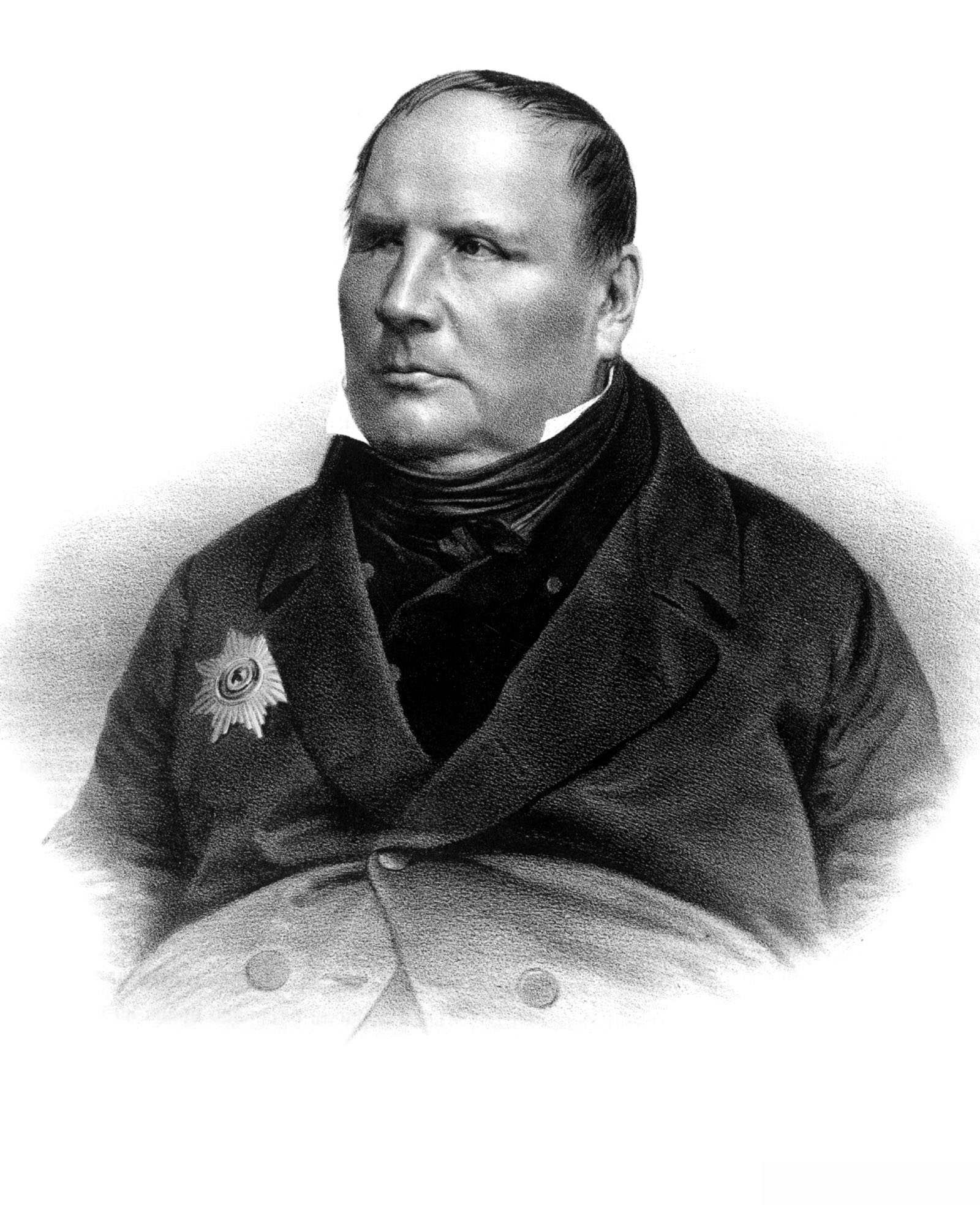
- Mikhail Vasilyevich Ostrogradsky
- Born: 24 September 1801; Pashennaya, Kobelyaksky Uyezd, Poltava Governorate, Russian Empire; now Kremenchuk Raion, Poltava Oblast, Ukraine
- Died: 1 January 1862 (aged 60); Poltava
- Citizenship: Russian Empire
- Education: University of Kharkiv, University of Paris
- Known for: Ostrogradsky instability, Divergence theorem
- Scientific career
- Fields: Mathematics

Mikhail Vasilyevich Ostrogradsky (Note: also transcribed as Ostrogradskiy and Ostrogradskiĭ) (Russian: Михаи́л Васи́льевич Острогра́дский; 24 September 1801 – 1 January 1862), also known as Mykhailo Vasyliovych Ostrohradskyi (Ukrainian: Миха́йло Васи́льович Острогра́дський), was a Russian Imperial mathematician, mechanician, and physicist of Ukrainian Cossack ancestry. Ostrogradsky was a student of Timofei Osipovsky and is considered to be a disciple of Leonhard Euler, who was known as one of the leading mathematicians of Imperial Russia.

== Life ==
Ostrogradsky was born on 24 September 1801 in the village of Pashennaya (at the time in the Poltava Governorate, Russian Empire, today in Kremenchuk Raion, Poltava Oblast, Ukraine). From 1816 to 1820, he studied under Timofei Osipovsky (1765–1832) and graduated from the Imperial University of Kharkov. When Osipovsky was suspended on religious grounds in 1820, Ostrogradsky refused to be examined and he never received his Ph.D. degree. From 1822 to 1826, he studied at the Sorbonne and at the Collège de France in Paris, France. In 1828, he returned to the Russian Empire and settled in Saint Petersburg, where he was elected a member of the Academy of Sciences. He also became a professor of the main military engineering school of the Russian Empire.

Ostrogradsky died in Poltava in 1862, aged 60. The Kremenchuk Mykhailo Ostrohradskyi National University in Kremenchuk, Poltava oblast, as well as Ostrogradsky street in Poltava, are named after him.

== Work ==
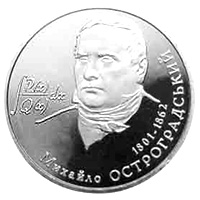
A 2 hryvna commemorative coin minted by the National Bank of Ukraine in 2001.

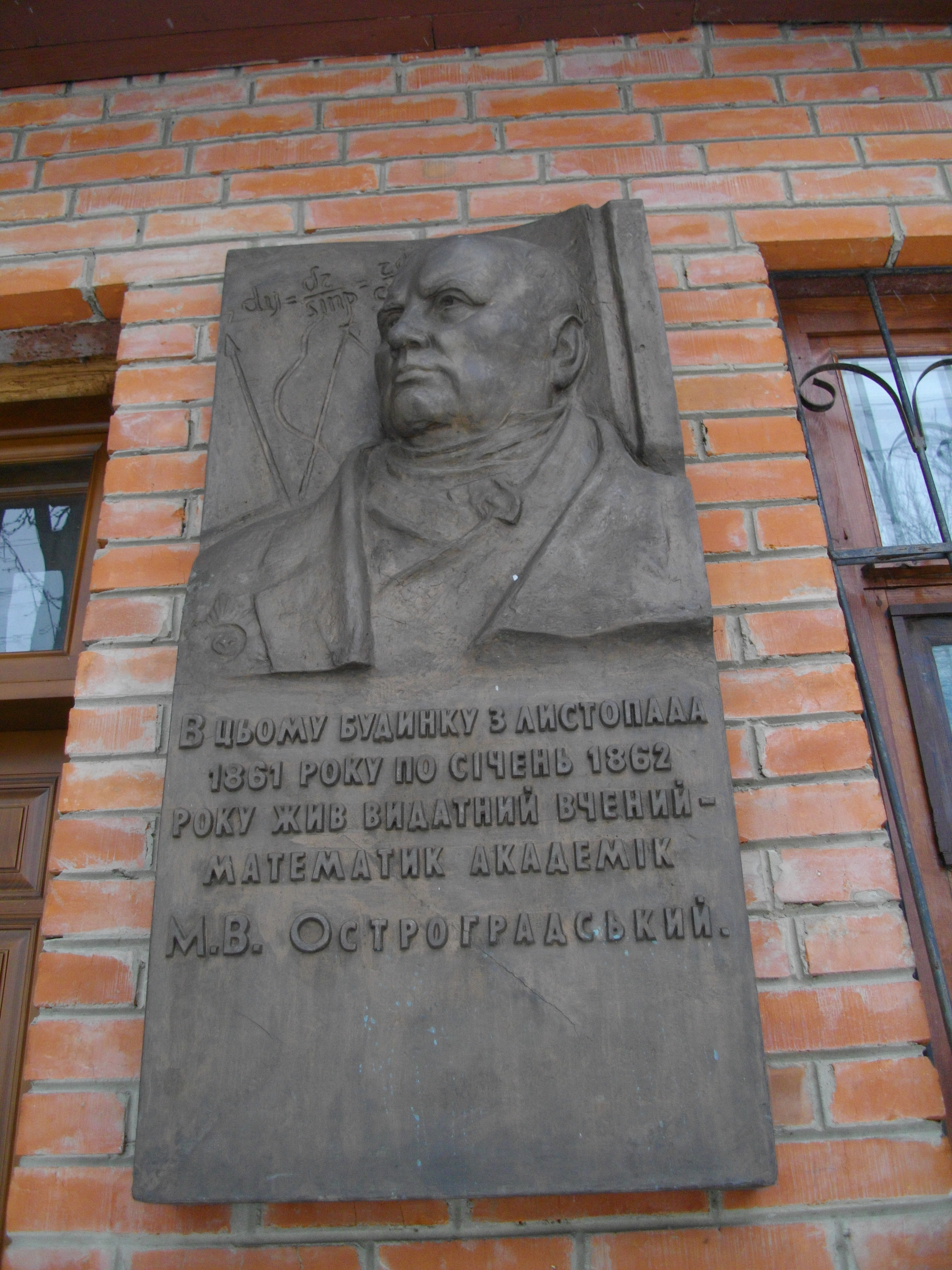
Commemorative plaque in Poltava on the last house where Ostrogradsky resided.

He worked mainly in the mathematical fields of calculus of variations, integration of algebraic functions, number theory, algebra, geometry, probability theory and in the fields of applied mathematics, mathematical physics and classical mechanics. In the latter, his key contributions are in the motion of an elastic body and the development of methods for integration of the equations of dynamics and fluid power, following up on the works of Euler, Joseph Louis Lagrange, Siméon Denis Poisson and Augustin Louis Cauchy.

In Russia, his work in these fields was continued by Nikolay Dmitrievich Brashman (1796–1866), August Yulevich Davidov (1823–1885) and especially by Nikolai Yegorovich Zhukovsky (1847–1921).

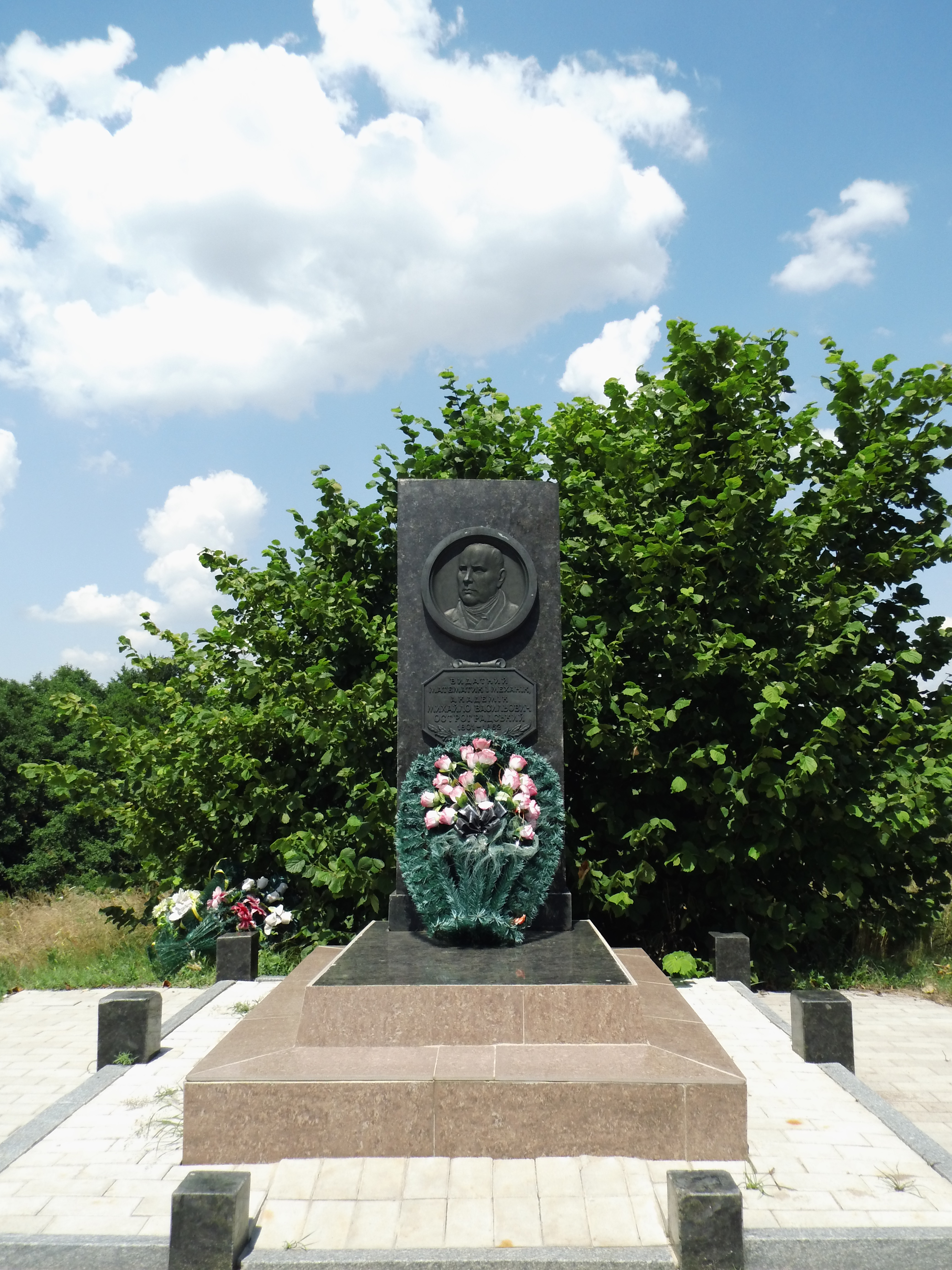
Ostrogradsky's grave in the village of Pashenivka, where he was born.

Ostrogradsky did not appreciate the work on non-Euclidean geometry of Nikolai Lobachevsky from 1823, and he rejected it, when it was submitted for publication in the Saint Petersburg Academy of Sciences.

Ostrogradsky was a teacher of the children of Emperor Nicholas I.

=== Divergence theorem ===
In 1826, Ostrogradsky gave the first general proof of the divergence theorem, which was discovered by Lagrange in 1762. This theorem may be expressed using Ostrogradsky's equation:

$$\iiint_V \left( {\partial P\over \partial x} + {\partial Q\over \partial y} + {\partial R\over \partial z} \right) dx \, dy \, dz =
\iint_\Sigma \left( P \cos \lambda + Q \cos \mu + R \cos \nu \right) d\Sigma$$;

where P, Q, and R are differentiable functions of x, y, and z defined on the compact region V bounded by a smooth closed surface Σ; λ, μ, and ν are the angles that the outward normal to Σ makes with the positive x, y, and z axes respectively; and dΣ is the surface area element on Σ.

=== Ostrogradsky's integration method ===
His method for integrating rational functions is well known. First, we separate the rational part of the integral of a fractional rational function, the sum of the rational part (algebraic fraction) and the transcendental part (with the logarithm and the arctangent). Second, we determine the rational part without integrating it, and we assign a given integral in Ostrogradsky's form:

$$\int {R(x)\over P(x)} \, dx = {T(x)\over S(x)} + \int {X(x)\over Y(x)} \, dx,$$

where $P(x),\, S(x),\, Y(x)$ are known polynomials of degrees p, s, y respectively; $R(x)$ is a known polynomial of degree not greater than $p - 1$; and $T(x),\, X(x)$ are unknown polynomials of degrees not greater than $s - 1$ and $y - 1$ respectively.

Third, $S(x)$ is the greatest common divisor of $P(x)$ and $P'(x)$. Fourth, the denominator of the remaining integral $Y(x)$ can be calculated from the equation $P(x) = S(x)\,Y(x)$.

When we differentiate both sides of the equation above, we get:
$R(x) = T'(x)Y(x) - T(x)H(x) + X(x)S(x)$,

where $H(x) = {Y(x) S'(x) \over S(x)}$.

It can be shown that $H(x)$ is polynomial.

== See also ==
- Gauss-Ostrogradsky theorem
- Green's theorem
- Ostrogradsky instability
