= Tetyana Kaganovska =

Ukrainian jurist and university rector

- Тетяна Кагановська
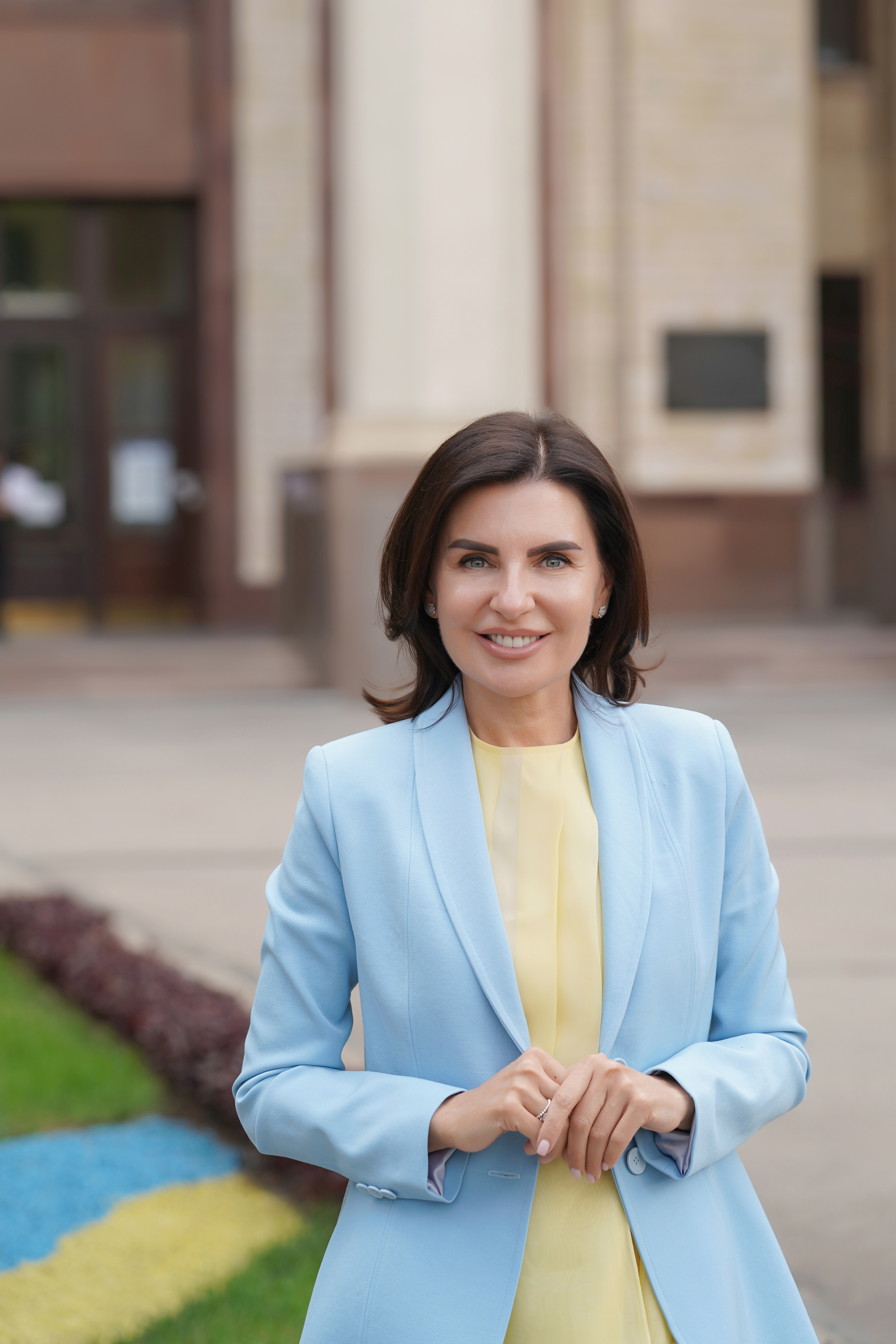

Rector of V. N. Karazin Kharkiv National University
- Incumbent
- Assumed office 14 July 2021
- Preceded by: Vil Bakirov

Personal details
- Born: Tetyana Yevheniivna Kushnaryova; 11 October 1975 (age 50) Melitopol, Zaporizhzhia Oblast, Ukrainian SSR, Soviet Union
- Citizenship: Ukraine
- Education: Yaroslav Mudryi National Law Academy of Ukraine
- Occupation: jurist, legal scholar, university professor
- Awards: Order of Princess Olga, 2nd class; Order of Princess Olga, 3rd class; Honored Lawyer of Ukraine

Tetyana Kaganovska (Ukrainian: Тетяна Євгеніївна Кагановська; née Kushnaryova; born 11 October 1975) is a Ukrainian legal scholar, Doctor of Law (2012), professor, and Honored Lawyer of Ukraine (2009). Since 14 July 2021, she has served as rector of V. N. Karazin Kharkiv National University.

== Biography ==
Kaganovska was born on 11 October 1975 in Melitopol to Yevhen Kushnaryov and Valentyna Viktorivna Kushnaryova. She has a twin brother, Andrii. The family lived in Kharkiv.

Her choice of profession was influenced by her grandfather, who worked as a judge in Melitopol and later as a lawyer in Kharkiv. Kaganovska studied law at the National Law Academy of Ukraine in Kharkiv (now Yaroslav Mudryi National Law University), graduating with honours in 1997 with a degree in law.

In 2000, she defended her Candidate of Sciences dissertation, titled Tax Authorities in the System of Subjects of Tax Legal Relations.

In 2012, she defended her doctoral dissertation, titled Administrative and Legal Foundations of Staffing in Public Administration in Ukraine, at the V. M. Koretsky Institute of State and Law of the National Academy of Sciences of Ukraine, receiving the degree of Doctor of Law.

In 2014, Kaganovska was awarded the academic title of professor at the Department of State and Legal Disciplines.

She is the author of more than 200 works in the fields of law and public administration published in Ukrainian and international academic publications, including textbooks, reference works, and monographs. She has supervised two Doctor of Law and seven Candidate of Law degree recipients.

== Career ==
Kaganovska joined V. N. Karazin Kharkiv National University in 2001, and her professional career has since been associated with the university.

She initially worked at the Department of Law of the Faculty of Philosophy and later became head of the department. At the initiative of university rector Vil Bakirov, Kaganovska and her colleagues re-established the university's Faculty of Law, which had been abolished by the Soviet authorities in the 20th century.

From 2006 to 2021, she served as dean of the Faculty of Law at V. N. Karazin Kharkiv National University.

On 2 June 2021, Kaganovska was elected rector of the university, defeating Ihor Hyrka, dean of the School of Physics and Technology, in the second round. On 14 July 2021, she was appointed rector by an order of the Ministry of Education and Science of Ukraine, becoming the first woman to head V. N. Karazin Kharkiv National University.

As rector, Kaganovska has focused on strengthening the university's research capacity and infrastructure, expanding international cooperation, and developing emerging fields such as artificial intelligence, nuclear medicine, and pharmacy.

Under Kaganovska's leadership, the university has maintained its position in the QS World University Rankings, ranking second among Ukrainian universities. Karazin University also ranks second among Ukrainian universities according to the national Scopus database ranking. Despite its location in the frontline city of Kharkiv, the university has remained integrated into the Ukrainian and international academic community.

At the beginning of the Russian invasion of Ukraine in 2022, Karazin University had nearly 13,000 students from Ukraine and 4,500 international students. Among its first tasks under wartime conditions were organizing the evacuation of students and providing them with food. The university also accommodated thousands of internally displaced persons from cities and villages affected by the war in its student dormitories.

Kaganovska remained in Kharkiv and, together with her colleagues, worked to assist students and university employees, address the consequences of Russian attacks, and adapt the educational process to wartime conditions.

The university suffered extensive damage during the war. By the end of 2025, damage to its physical infrastructure was estimated at ₴4.5 billion (more than €90 million), while environmental damage exceeded ₴7.5 billion (€150 million). One of the principal challenges was restoring the educational process under these conditions. During the first month of the full-scale invasion, the university operated asynchronously before switching to online teaching. It later adopted a hybrid format, in which online instruction is combined with in-person practical training for students in certain fields, including the natural sciences, engineering, and medicine, using laboratories relocated to safer locations.

The university plans to increase the share of in-person teaching from September 2026. For this purpose, it established the Landau safe scientific and educational space, which can accommodate 2,000 students in shifts.

Under Kaganovska's leadership, Karazin University has maintained and increased its student population. At the beginning of 2026, more than 15,500 students were enrolled at the university. Although the number of international students declined following the full-scale invasion, the university continued to enroll students from abroad, with 232 students and nine postgraduate students from 25 countries.

Kaganovska has cited the university's performance in academic rankings, the flexibility of its teaching formats, the adaptation of its academic programmes to contemporary conditions, and its university community as factors contributing to its ability to continue operating during the war.

Kaganovska has advocated strengthening education and research in the natural and engineering sciences, which she considers important to Ukraine's future resilience. Despite the war, Karazin University has continued its international cooperation and participation in educational programmes aimed at modernizing laboratories and developing fields including bioengineering and nuclear medicine.

The university's Biomedical Research Laboratory acquired a REGENHU R-GEN200 robotic bioprinter, described as the first of its kind in Eastern Europe, which is capable of producing elements of human organs and tissues.

According to Kaganovska, universities should serve as centres for preserving and developing human potential, including through non-formal education. Karazin University operates professional development programmes for veterans seeking to acquire new skills.

== Personal life ==
Kaganovska's husband, Oleksandr Kaganovskyi, is a Kharkiv businessman and a graduate of V. N. Karazin Kharkiv National University. They married in 2000.

The couple have three children: a daughter, Polina, and two sons, Pavlo and Mykhailo.

In May 2024, the Kahanovskyi family's home in Kharkiv was destroyed in a Russian airstrike.

== Criticism ==
In 2021, shortly before the election for rector of V. N. Karazin Kharkiv National University, LIGA.Life reported allegations that Kaganovska's doctoral dissertation contained passages from academic works by two Russian professors without attribution. According to the publication, the materials supporting the allegations were provided to the editorial staff by "Ukrainian scholars who insisted on anonymity".

The concept of academic plagiarism was formally incorporated into Ukrainian legislation with the adoption of the Law of Ukraine On Higher Education in 2014, while Kaganovska had defended her doctoral dissertation in 2012.

Kaganovska rejected the allegations and described the publication, which was based on claims by anonymous scholars, as part of an election campaign by her competitors for the position of rector. Addressing the substance of the allegations, she stated that the identified borrowings did not concern the sections of the dissertation presenting its scientific novelty, which were required to be entirely original. She also argued that the passages in question had been taken from publicly available Ukrainian-language sources in which they had been used for years and had, in her view, long since lost their connection to the original works and authors.

== Awards and honours ==
- Order of Princess Olga, 2nd class (2025)
- Order of Princess Olga, 3rd class (2019)
- Honorary title of Honored Lawyer of Ukraine
- National Academy of Sciences of Ukraine award "For Contribution to the Development of Science"
- Presidential award of Ukraine "For the Defence of Ukraine"
- Ministry of Defence of Ukraine Badge of Honour
- Commemorative medal "For the Defence of the Hero City of Kharkiv"
- Certificate of Honour of the Verkhovna Rada "For Services to the Ukrainian People"
- Honorary award of the Kharkiv Oblast Council, "Slobozhanska Slava"
- Certificate of Honour of the Kharkiv Oblast State Administration "For a significant personal contribution to the development of the rule of law, protection of the constitutional rights and freedoms of citizens, strengthening of law and order, and high professionalism"

== Selected publications ==
- Kushnaryova, T. (2000). "Правовідносини, що складаються між суб'єктами податкового права, та їх особливості". Pravo Ukrainy (in Ukrainian) (6): 104. ISSN 0132-1331.
- Kaganovska, T. (2010). "Щодо поняття та змісту сучасного державного управління". Pravo Ukrainy (in Ukrainian) (12): 152–157. ISSN 0132-1331.
- Kaganovska, Tetyana (29 January 2024). "Karazin University: 219 Years of Social Responsibility". Kyiv Post.
- Kaganovska, Tetyana (17 November 2023). "Kharkiv's Classical Karazin University: Reflections on a New Mission for Its 219th Anniversary". Kyiv Post.
