= Petr Shatilov =

Russian and Ukrainian physician and professor

- Петр Иванович Шатилов
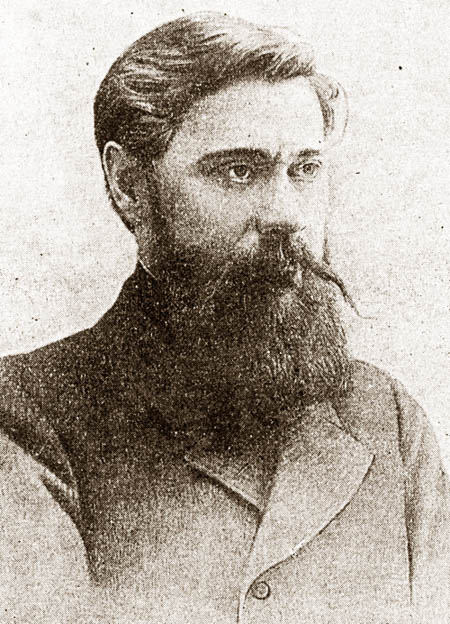
- Born: Petr Ivanovich Shatilov; 16 October 1869; Sloboda Kazatskaya; Starooskol County; Kursk Governorate, Russian Empire
- Died: 13 May 1921 (aged 51); Kharkiv, Ukraine
- Education: National University of Kharkiv
- Scientific career
- Fields: Physician
- Workplaces: National University of Kharkiv, Kharkiv National Medical University

Petr Ivanovich Shatilov (Russian: Петр Иванович Шатилов, IPA: [pʲɵtr ɨvanovʲɪtɕ ʂɐtʲiləf], Ukrainian: Петро Іванович Шатілов; 16 October [O.S. 4 October] 1869 – 13 May 1921) was a Russian and Ukrainian physician, professor of Kharkiv University.

== Family and early career ==
Petr Ivanovich Shatilov belonged to an old noble family. He graduated from Kharkiv University, School of Medicine, with Honors in 1895.

During his student years, Shatilov worked at a zemstvo clinic, participating in the efforts to combat a cholera epidemic. In 1902 he defended his doctoral thesis, A Study of Puls Graphs (Rus.:К учению о формах пульсовых кривых). Next year Shatilov became an assistant-professor teaching clinical research methods.

== Research and teaching activity before the Revolution of 1917 ==
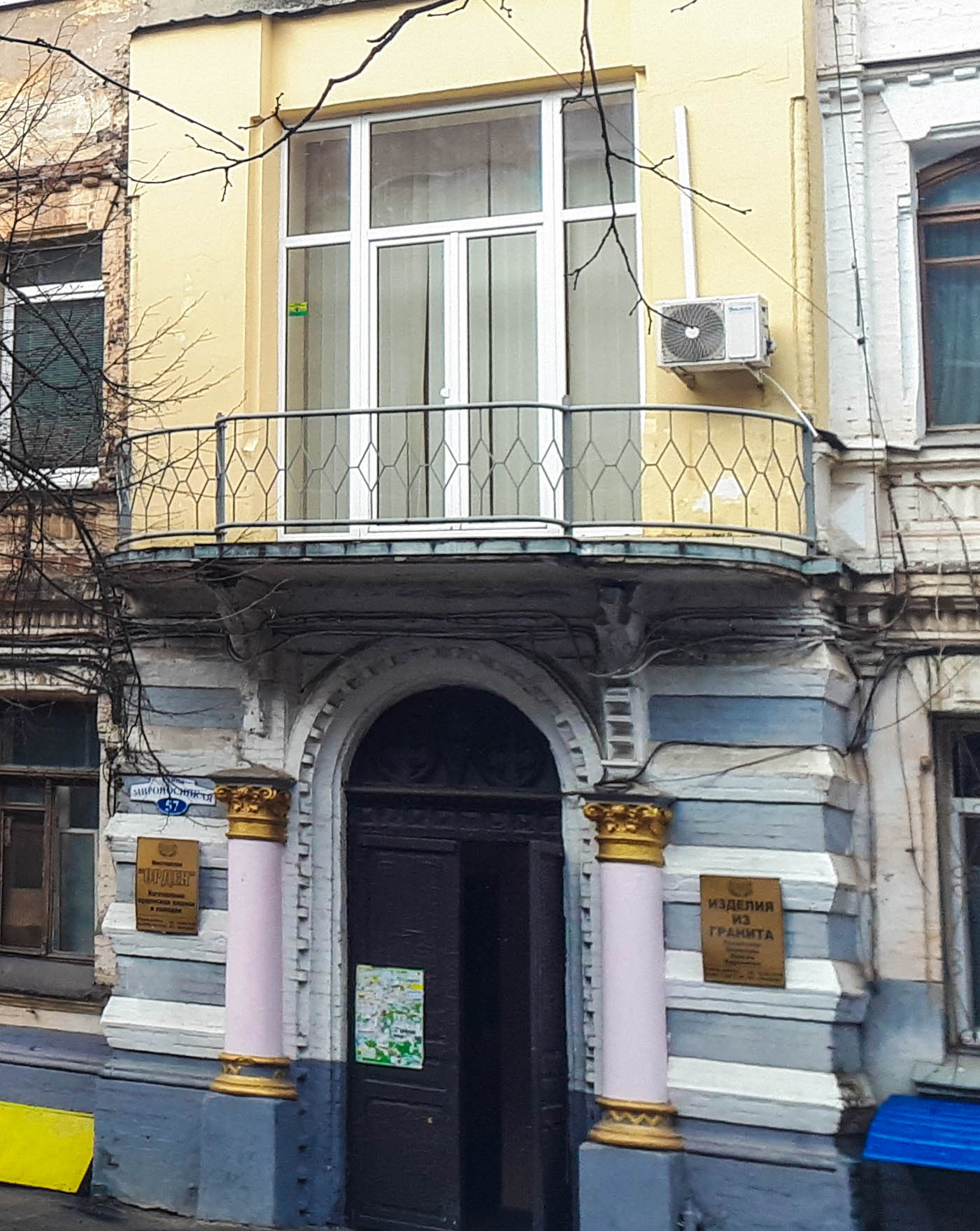
A house at 57 Myronosytska St. in Kharkiv where Professor Shatilov lived with his family in 1916

Shatilov worked in Zurich, Berlin, and Bern from 1906 to 1908. He studied the latest diagnostic methods, examined body metabolism, and conducted research in the fields of immunology and bacteriology.

In 1909, Shatilov returned to Russia and received a position of professor at the Department of Diagnostics, Kharkiv University School of Medicine. While working in this capacity, Shatilov experimented with typhoid vaccine which showed effectiveness as a new method of treatment. This experiment was carried out without official permission, which led to Shatilov's resignation as head of the department.

In 1912 Shatilov presented two papers at the First International Congress in Comparative Pathology in Paris. The first paper was on a clinical study of typhoid vaccination and the second dealt with the individual approach to diagnostics, patient care, and treatment.

When Shatilov returned to Kharkiv he was already an internationally acclaimed physician. In January 1913 he became the head of the therapeutic clinic of Kharkiv University. Next year his responsibilities included supervision of the therapeutic clinic of the Women's Medical Institute of Kharkiv Medical Society. When a steering committee for needy students of Women's Medical Institute was created, Shatilov was elected its chairman.

In 1911 Shatilov became one of the organizers of the Kharkiv department of the All-Russian League for the fight against tuberculosis and in 1912 he was elected chairman of the outpatient board for the Society of Financial Aid to Sick Impoverished Students in Higher Educational Institutions of Kharkiv.

== Doctor, scientist, and educator during the Revolution and Civil Wars ==
In 1918-1921 Shatilov was the head of the Internal Medicine Department at the Kharkiv University School of Medicine.

In addition to his teaching duties, Shatilov had considerable private practice. He offered free medical care to patients in need.

Following the October Coup of 1917 and the turmoil of the ensuing wars the city of Kharkiv changed hands several times. From June to December 1919 Kharkiv was held by Denikin's White Army (Armed Forces of South Russia (AFSR)). The White regiments were replenished with a significant number of volunteers in the city. In his memoirs, Sergei Pushkarev, the nephew of Professor Shatilov, writes that, when he joined the White Army as a volunteer, his entire family including his uncle supported this decision.

In 1918 Shatilov joined an editorial board of the newly created magazine Medical Practice (Rus.: Врачебное Дѣло). Shatilov later became the publication's editor-in-chief.

The typhus epidemic swept Ukraine, Don, and North Caucasus at the beginning of 1918. Denikin's army suffered its worst losses from the typhus epidemic in the winter of 1919–1920. So did the population at large, however the civilian losses are much more difficult to assess. In 1922, Russian epidemiologist Lev Tarasevich estimated the number of patients with typhus during 1918 to 1920 at 25 million.

In 1920 Shatilov led a commission for the study of typhus and actively participated in efforts to combat the disease.

== Personal life ==
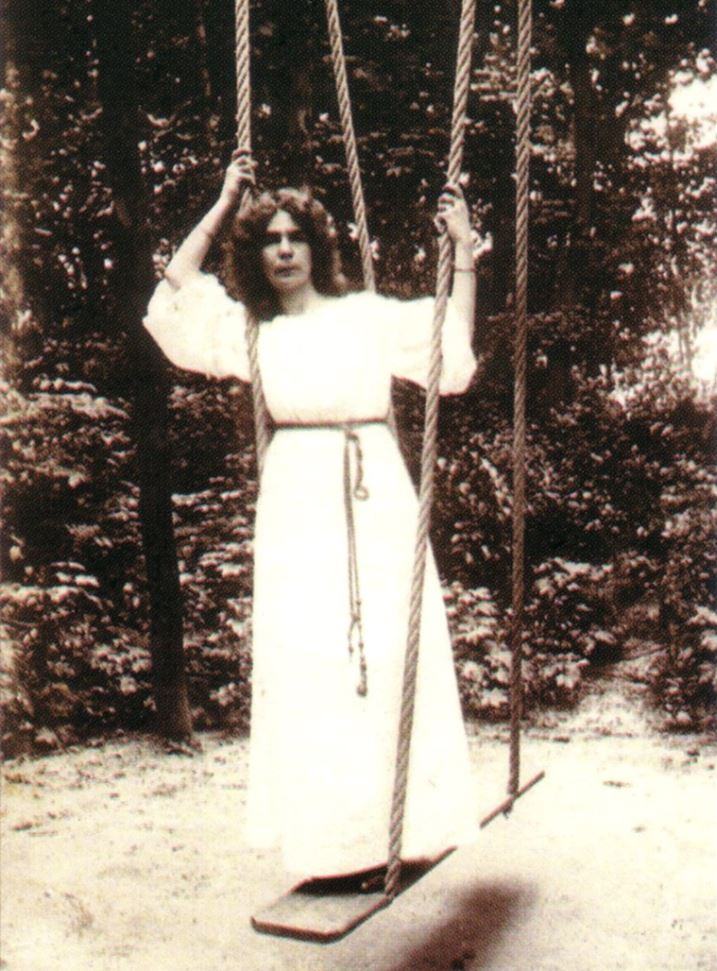
Maria Shatilova (née Dosekina) on a swing in her yard in Kharkiv.

During his years as a medical student, Shatilov rented an apartment on Sumska Street 90 from a photographer and entrepreneur V.S.Dosekin. Later Shatilov married Dosekin's daughter Maria (1871—1942). As a dowry she received 48 dessiatin of land (approximately 130 acres) on the outskirts of the city. The present-day neighborhood of Shatilivka takes its name from this property.

Shatilov and his wife had three sons: Nikolai (1897-1942), Aleksandr, and Dmitry, and a daughter Anna.

== Scientific work ==
Shatilov is the author of more than 30 scientific papers covering various fields of medicine, such as physiology, epidemiology, pharmacology, hematology, radiology, and bacteriology, linking them with diagnostics and clinical practice.

== Death ==
On 2 May 1921, while examining patients in jail, professor Shatilov contracted typhus. He died on 13 May. Shatilov's last words were: "No wreaths, no speeches." He bequeathed his body to the Kharkiv University for scientific research.

== Selected works ==
- Шатилов П. И. К вопросу о разновидностях функциональных диссоциаций сердца. СПб, 1897
- Шатилов П. И. Записки по диагностике. Харьков, 1915
- Шатилов П. И. Очерк важнейших заболеваний сердечно-сосудистой системы. Харьков, 1919
- Шатилов П. И. Клинические лекции. Харьков, 1927
