= Kharkiv University History Museum =

- Музей історії ХНУ імені В. Н. Каразіна
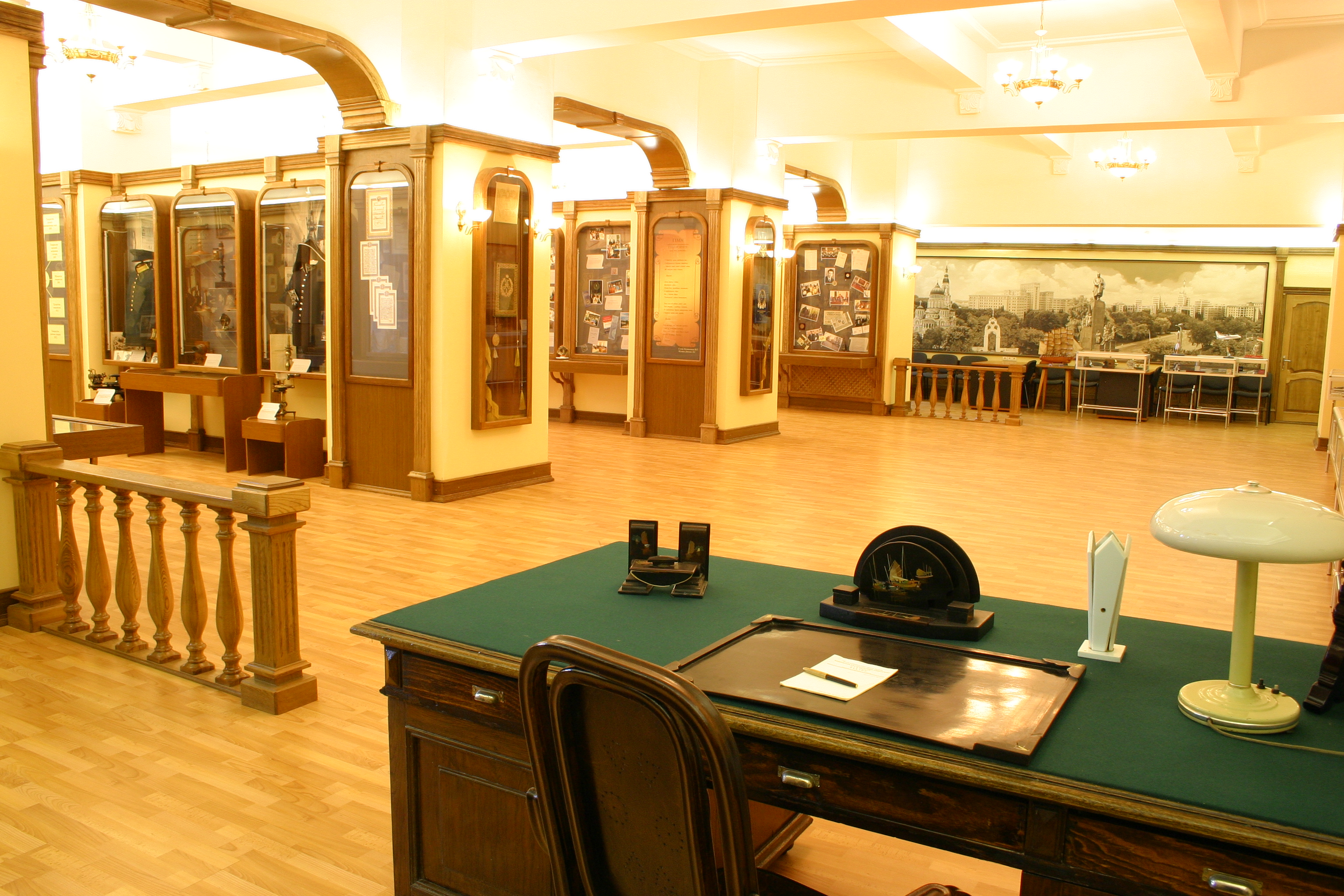
- The Kharkiv University History Museum
- Established: December 1972
- Location: Ukraine, Kharkiv, 4 Svobody Sq., V. N. Karazin Kharkiv National University\
- Coordinates: 50.0042°N 36.2279°E
- Type: History museum
- Collection size: approx. 20 thousand objects
- Visitors: approx. 5 thousand people annually
- Directors: Ivashchenko Victoria Yurievna, Candidate of Historical Sciences, Associate Professor
- Website: http://history.karazin.ua/schools/university-history-museum

Kharkiv University History Museum is one of the first history museums created at a higher educational institution in Ukraine. It is located on the second floor of the main building of V. N. Karazin Kharkiv National University.

== History ==
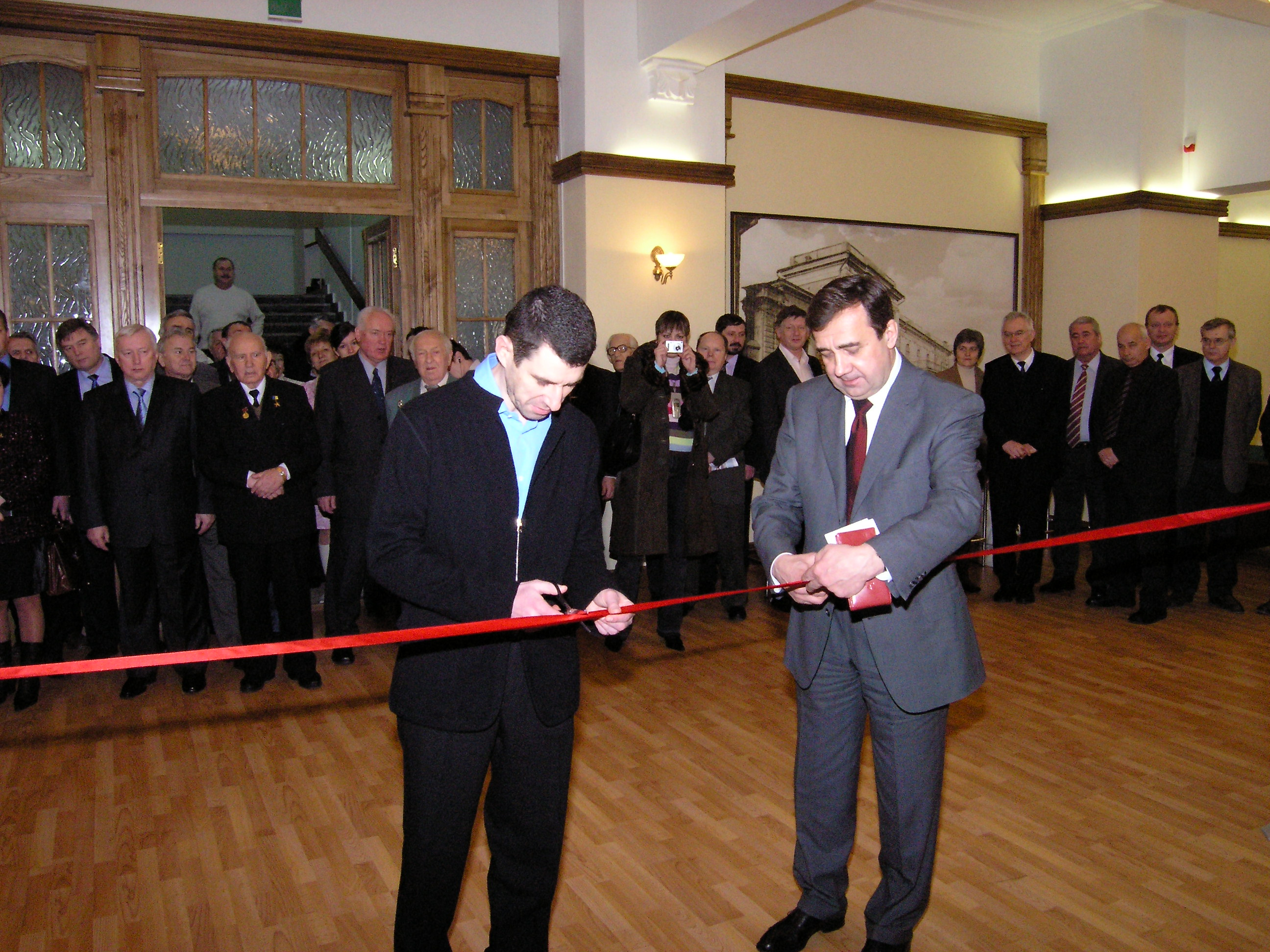
Opening of the museum in a new (current) building

The idea of creating Kharkiv University History Museum arose in the postwar years, in particular, it was expressed by the rector of Kharkiv University I. M. Bulankin. In 1971, by order of Rector V. I. Khotkevych, an initiative group was organized to establish Kharkiv University History Museum, headed by associate professor of the School of History V. I. Astakhova. The museum was opened on December 30, 1972. It was one of the first museums of the history, created at higher educational institutions of Ukraine. The museum was located in the right wing of the main building of Kharkiv University. It consisted of a large hall for permanent exhibition, a gallery of portraits of academicians and corresponding members of the Academy of Sciences of the USSR, whose activities were related to Kharkiv University, office room, depository and photo laboratory.

On September 25, 1978, Kharkiv University History Museum was awarded the title of "National Museum". The museum was awarded honorary diplomas, in particular, Diplomas of the Ukrainian Society of Historic Preservation and Culture (1977) and of the Ukrainian SSR Ministry of Culture (1984) and others.

It was in the museum that the idea of creating a monument in honour of the Volunteer Student Battalion recruited from students of Kharkiv National University originated.

In preparation for the celebration of the Kharkiv University bicentenary, the museum received a new space on the second floor of the main building, which was reconstructed with the financial assistance of the Kharkiv University Association of Alumni, Professors and Friends. The staff of the museum together with the professors of the School of History S. I. Posokhov and S. M. Kudelko developed the concept of a new museum; the developments of the architect O. E. Fondorko made it possible to combine elements of "retro" with new, modern methods of exposition equipment. The renovated museum began its work on January 28, 2005. The new museum's integrated space is conventionally divided into 4 zones: permanent exhibition; hall for temporary exhibitions and other events; a place for researchers to work; cinema hall. In 2018, the museum was equipped with multimedia panels.

== Museum collection ==
Since the museum's existence, its staff has established communication with family members of distinguished scientists, collected memories, books, manuscripts, and personal belongings of members of the university community – all of which have become museum exhibits. Much work has been done to collect materials in central and regional archives, in the manuscript collections of libraries. Many interesting exhibits came to the museum on the eve and during the anniversary celebrations from the staff and students of Kharkiv University.

Currently, the museum has about 20 thousand units of storage, 10 thousand negatives and 16 thousand electronic photos. Among the exhibits – a collection of graduation photo albums of the late 19th century to the early 21st century; badges and medals; recordings of interviews with university graduates and staff; individual material exhibits that characterize university life; 233 personal funds of scientists and students of the university including D. I. Bagaliy, N. P. Barabashov, O. V. Vetukhiv and others.

Museum funds are used by students, graduate students and researchers of many scientific centers of Ukraine.

== Permanent exhibition ==
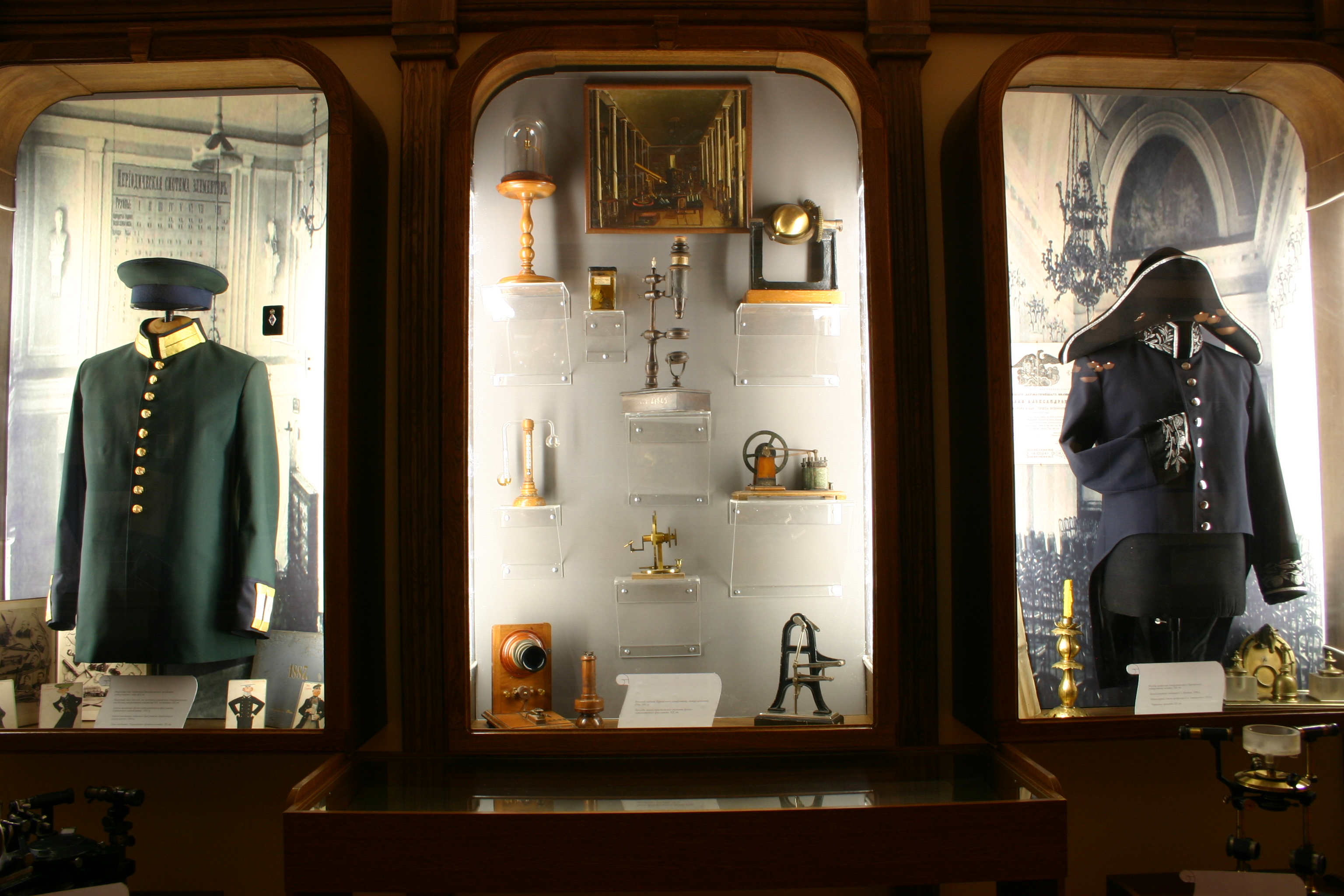
Fragment of the exposition

The exhibition is built on a thematic and chronological principle and consists of four large sections that cover the history of the university in different periods:

- Imperial Kharkiv University (1804–1917);
- Kharkiv University in the period of reorganizations (1917–1933);
- restoration of the university and its history in the 1930s, during the Second World War and post-war reconstruction, development of the educational and scientific potential of the university in the 1950s–80s;
- activity of the university in the conditions of independent Ukraine.

In 2018, the central part of the museum was equipped with multimedia panels that allow visitors to be demonstrated the diversity of modern events in university life, its connection with the traditions of Kharkiv University. In particular, thanks to multimedia panels, visitors can see photos and videos, interviews, virtual exhibitions, interactive maps, as well as various databases: biographies of scientists, prominent students of the university, honorary doctors, merited professors and researchers of Kharkiv University, chronicle of events of university life, university symbols, university "places of memory" etc.

== Areas of work ==
=== Excursion activities ===
Every year the museum is visited by about four thousand guests. The main share of visitors is students, those attending the Center for International Education, participants of scientific conferences, guests of the university. The museum conducts excursions within such university-wide actions as Science Night, Alumni Day, and the Discover Karazin University project.

=== Organization of temporary exhibitions ===
Every year the museum organizes 6–8 temporary exhibitions related to various aspects of university history. The recent ones are "Graduation Albums of Kharkiv University", "Student Life in Caricature", "N. I. Kostomarov: life, creativity, memory (to the 200th birth anniversary)", "Professor's family of the XIX – early XX centuries", "University students in "troubled times" (1920s – 1930s)" etc. In 2016, the museum launched a new tradition of exhibitions of private collections of professors and students of Karazin University.

=== Conducting university history promotion campaigns ===
The museum invites the university community to take part in special events based on the active cooperation of the museum staff and visitors. The first such event was called "Front Album", in which the museum invited everyone – students, staff, and professors – to bring to the museum photos of their relatives from the Second World War. In this way, "The Front Album" a joint university album was created.

In 2016, during the event "Poetry of Loss and Hope", a special video was shot in which students of the School of History read poems by university graduates about the war.

In 2017, the event "Children of War (1941–1945): Fates and Memories" was held, during which the museum staff collected memories of university professors whose childhood fell on the difficult war years, in 2018 – "Women at War".

Students and professors actively participated in the "Museum Selfie" event and the caricature competition for student life.

Every year the museum hosts a university-wide event "Light a Candle" to commemorate the victims of the Holodomor, as well as a citywide event to Archivists’ Day (until 2016). The museum also regularly organizes various competitions for Kharkiv students, for example, a competition for the creation of virtual exhibitions "Kharkiv University of the city, Ukraine, the world!".

=== Promotion of university history in the media and the Internet ===
The museum has its own pages on Facebook and Instagram, where information is constantly updated. Various virtual exhibitions are created. The museum staff actively advertises museum events on social networks, television and citywide Internet resources.

=== University History Club ===
It has been operating since 2005 on the basis of the museum. Its active participants are primarily students and professors of the School of History, but it is open to all participants. Club meetings are held once a month. Reports on the history of education at, first of all, Kharkiv University are discussed there, also books on relevant topics are presented, meetings with professors, staff and students of the university are held, tours of the university and university places of memory are organized.

=== Educational work with students ===
Using the museum as a basis, student projects are developed within the special courses of the School of History and the School of International Economic Relations and Tourism Business. For three years in a row, first-year students of the School of History had one of their end-of-the-course tests on "Introduction to the specialty" (professor– S. I. Posokhov) in the form of a quest by the university and surrounding university places. On the basis of the museum, some students of the School of History participate in museum practice, learning the basics of fund, excursion and exhibition work.

=== Scientific and fund work ===
The museum staff is working to expand the funds and create an electronic catalog. The results of scientific research of the museum staff are published in professional periodicals, presented at national and international conferences.

Over the past few years, the museum staff has created databases: biographies of scientists, prominent students of the university, honorary doctors, merited professors and researchers of Kharkiv University, a chronicle of university life, university symbols, university "places of memory". At this stage, they allow providing additional consultations during excursions, and in the future can be included to the permanent exhibition in the form of multimedia panels.

A number of materials dedicated to the history of Kharkiv University were published with the participation of the museum staff. In particular, in 2016, with the support of the Canadian Institute of Ukrainian Studies, the 3rd volume of memoirs about Kharkiv University, dedicated to the 1920s and 1930s, was published.

Together with the School of History, the museum is a co-organizer of the traditional museum study conference "Lunyov Readings".

=== Research topics of the museum ===
At the moment, several scientific projects are being implemented on the basis of the museum: together with the School of History – an oral history project "Images of Science: Kharkiv University in the 1940s–1980s". So far, more than 350 interviews with students, professors and staff of the university have been collected, which formed the basis of a separate fund of the Kharkiv University History Museum; also the project "University "places of memory", the object of study of which is the named lecture rooms of the university, memorial plaques dedicated to professors and prominent people related to the activities of the university etc.
