= Petro Hulak‑Artemovsky =

Ukrainian scholar (1790–1865)

Petro Hulak-Artemovsky
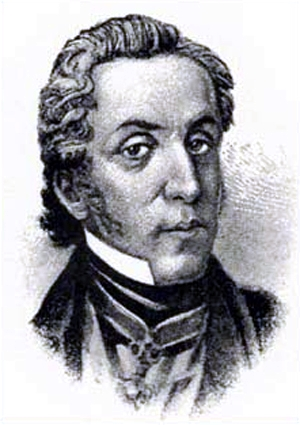
- Petro Hulak-Artemovsky (engraving)
- Born: 27 January 1790; Horodyshche, Kyiv Governorate, Russian Empire (now Cherkasy Oblast, Ukraine)
- Died: 13 October 1865 (aged 75); Kharkiv, Russian Empire (now Ukraine)
- Education: Kyiv Theological Academy; Kharkiv University
- Occupations: Poet, fabulist, translator, scholar, university rector
- Notable work: Pan i sobaka (The Master and His Dog)

Petro Petrovych Hulak-Artemovsky (Ukrainian: Петро Петрович Гулак-Артемовський; 27 January 1790 – 13 October 1865) was a Ukrainian poet, fabulist, translator of classical literature and scholar who became rector of Kharkiv University. He is regarded as one of the classics of early modern Ukrainian literature and is best known for his satirical fables, in particular Pan i sobaka (The Master and His Dog).

== Early life and education ==
Hulak-Artemovsky was born on 27 January 1790 in the town of Horodyshche in the Kyiv Governorate, today Cherkasy Oblast in central Ukraine, into the family of an Orthodox priest of noble Cossack descent. He received his first education at home and in local church schools and then studied at the Kyiv Theological Academy in the early 1800s. Sources differ on dates and completion, but he spent several years at the Academy before leaving for secular employment and further study.

After leaving the Academy he worked for some time as a tutor and teacher in private noble households in Volhynia, gaining familiarity with the everyday speech and life of Ukrainian peasants that would later feed into his literary work.

== Academic career ==
In 1817 Hulak-Artemovsky enrolled as an auditor at Kharkiv University and soon began teaching there. In 1818 he was appointed lecturer in Polish language and literature, and in 1825 he became professor of Russian history and geography. In 1821 he defended a master’s dissertation on the usefulness of history, particularly national history, and on methods of teaching it, which helped secure his position in the university’s faculty of philosophy and history.

Hulak-Artemovsky rose through the academic ranks: he became an ordinary professor in 1829, dean of the faculty of philology (then often called the “faculty of letters”) in 1838, and served as rector of Kharkiv University from 1841 to 1849. At the same time he held administrative posts in women’s educational institutions, including positions at the Kharkiv and Poltava Institutes for Noble Maidens.

== Literary work ==
Hulak-Artemovsky began to publish his literary works in the 1810s, primarily in the Kharkiv journal Ukrainskii vestnik (Ukrainian Herald). Familiar with peasant speech and everyday life, he developed a style that combined elements of vernacular Ukrainian with burlesque and parody in the tradition of Ivan Kotliarevsky’s Eneida.

His best‑known work is the satirical fable Pan i sobaka (The Master and His Dog, 1818), a social allegory that exposes the arbitrary brutality and hypocrisy of serf‑owning landowners through the story of a faithful dog beaten by his master. Many of his other poems and fables likewise criticise social injustice and the abuses of the nobility, often disguising commentary on serfdom and officialdom beneath humorous or animal narratives.

In addition to original works, Hulak-Artemovsky translated classical authors, including adaptations of Horace and other Latin poets, and produced travesties and paraphrases that transplanted classical motifs into the Ukrainian context. A complete collection of his Ukrainian‑language verse was published in the later nineteenth century and helped secure his place in the canon of Ukrainian literature.

== Style and themes ==
Critics have described Hulak-Artemovsky as a key representative of the early nineteenth‑century “new Ukrainian literature”, bridging the late baroque and classicist traditions with emerging romantic and realist tendencies. His fables and poems often use comic, colloquial language and grotesque exaggeration, yet they carry a serious moral and social message.

A recurring theme in his work is the injustice of serfdom and the vulnerability of peasants and dependents in the face of arbitrary authority, as in Pan i sobaka and other fables. He also employs a “double‑coded” style in which ostensibly light or humorous texts contain implicit criticism of imperial policies and social structures.

== Legacy ==
Hulak-Artemovsky’s work influenced later Ukrainian poets and fabulists and helped establish the use of modern literary Ukrainian in satirical and narrative verse. Literary historians consider him, alongside Ivan Kotliarevsky and Hryhorii Kvitka-Osnovianenko, one of the foundational figures of nineteenth‑century Ukrainian literature. His fables continue to be reprinted in school readers and anthologies, and modern commentators note that their critiques of social arrogance and violence remain relevant.

He died in Kharkiv on 13 October 1865 and was buried there; memorial articles and local studies continue to appear, especially in connection with anniversaries of his birth.

== Selected works ==
- Pan i sobaka (The Master and His Dog, 1818), satirical fable about a faithful dog abused by his master.
- Tvardovskyi (ballad; paraphrase after Polish sources).
- Various poetic epistles, comic poems and fables published in Ukrainskii vestnik and other periodicals.

== See also ==
- Ukrainian literature
- Kharkiv University
