= VN Karazin Kharkiv National University =

Public university in Kharkiv, Ukraine

V. N. Karazin Kharkiv National University
- Харківський національний університет імені В.Н.Каразіна
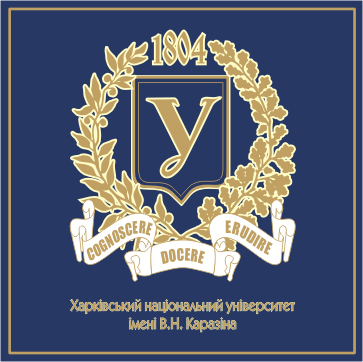
- University emblem
- Latin: Universitas Charcoviensis
- Former names: Imperial Kharkov University (1804—1917) • Free Academy of Theoretical Knowledge (1920-21) • Kharkiv Institute of Public Education (1920—1932) etc. Kharkiv State University (1932—99)
- Motto: Cognoscere, Docere, Erudire (Latin)
- Motto in English: To Learn, To Educate, To Enlighten
- Type: National university
- Established: 29 January 1804; 222 years ago
- Affiliations: Ministry of Education and Science of Ukraine
- Academic affiliations: IAU, EUA, WHO
- Rector: Tetyana Kahanovska
- Faculty: 2,256
- Students: 17,368
- Postgraduates: 500
- Location: 4, Svobody square, 61022, Kharkiv, Kharkiv Oblast, Ukraine
- Campus: Urban
- Colors: Blue & White
- Website: karazin.ua
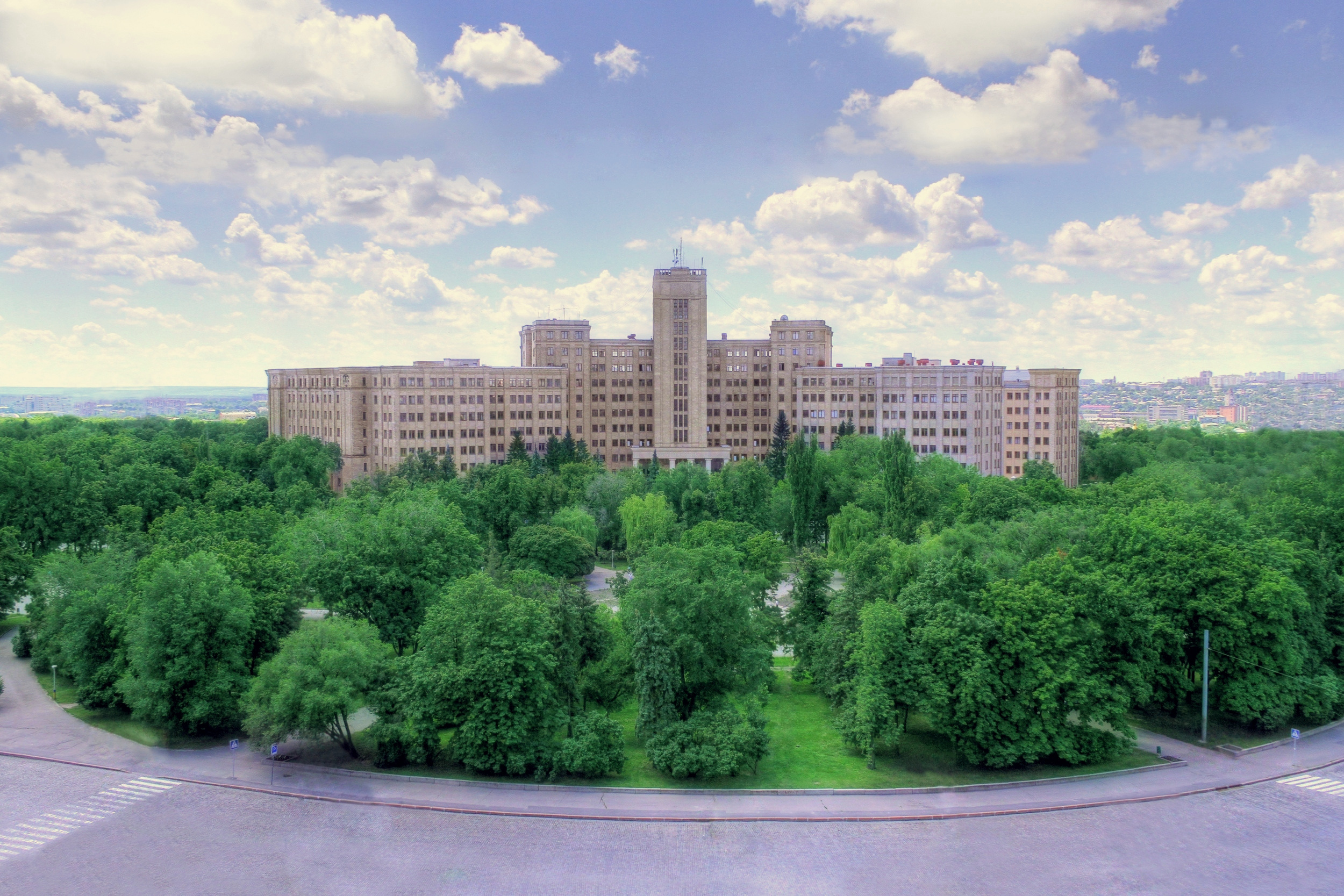

The V. N. Karazin Kharkiv National University (Ukrainian: Харківський національний університет імені В.Н. Каразіна, romanized: Kharkivskyi natsionalnyi universytet imeni V.N. Karazina), also known as Kharkiv National University or Karazin University, is a public university in Kharkiv, Ukraine. It was founded in 1804 through the efforts of Vasily Karazin, becoming the second oldest university, and the oldest continuously operating one, in modern-day Ukraine.

During the Russian invasion of Ukraine, all buildings of the university were partially or fully destroyed by attacks from Russian forces.

== History ==
=== Russian Empire ===
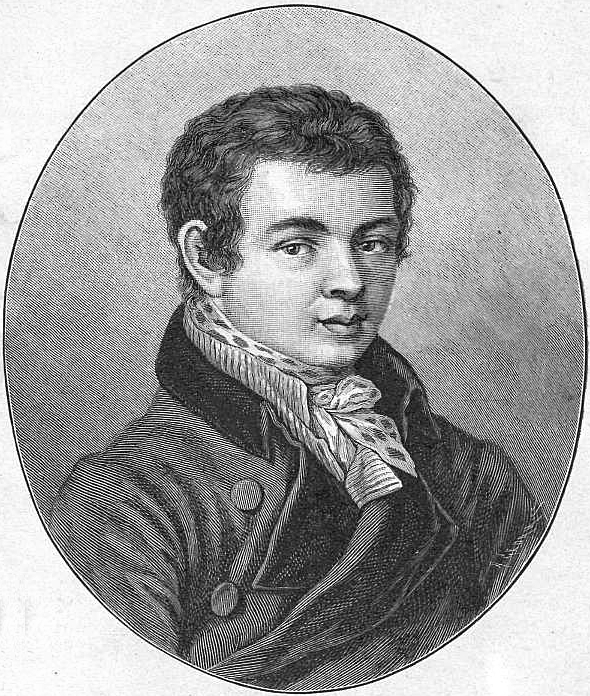
Vasily Karazin

On 29 January [O.S. 17 January] 1805, the Decree on the Opening of the Imperial University in Kharkov came into force. The university became the second university in the south of the Russian Empire. It was founded on the initiative of the local community with Vasily Karazin at the fore, whose idea was supported by the nobility and the local authorities. Count Seweryn Potocki was appointed the first supervisor of the university, the first rector being the philologist and philosopher Ivan Rizhsky.

In 1811, the Philotechnical Society was founded, while the Mathematical Society of Kharkov, the Historical and Philological Society of Kharkiv, the Naturalists Society, Societies of Physics, Chemistry, Law, among others, were established in the second half of the 19th century. The first periodicals in Slobozhanshchyna appear in the university around this time, including Kharkovski Ezhenedelnik (1812), Ukrainski Vestnik (1816–1819), Ukrainski Zhurnal (1824–1825), etc.

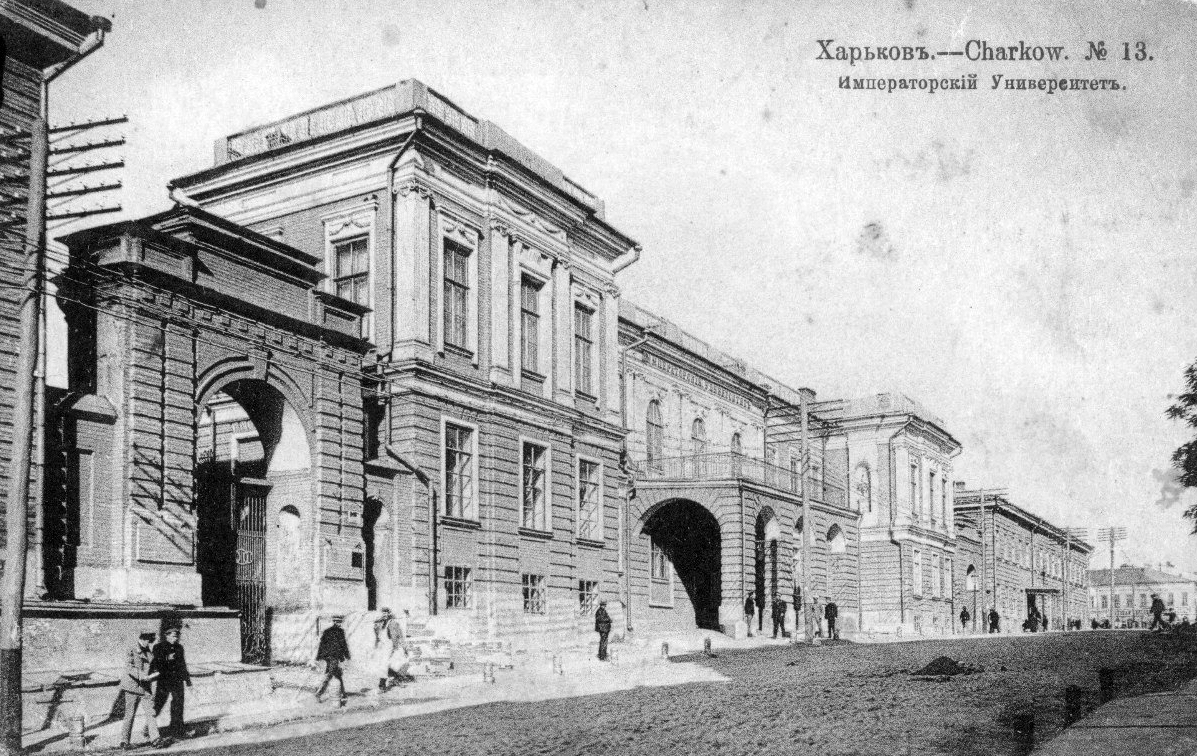
Governor's Palace, late 19th century. Old university building

In 1839, a veterinary school, which in 1851 became an independent institute, was established at the university. By this time, the campus included laboratories, clinics, an astronomical observatory, a botanical garden and a library.

Previously, the university was autonomous with rectors being elected. However, from 1820 to 1850, all its activity was strictly controlled. Rectors were appointed by the Minister of Education, while scientific publications, and academic processes were censored. In 1863, under a new Statute, the university became partly autonomous.

The university has been publishing Scientific Notes since 1874.

From the 19th century up to the early 20th century, the University of Kharkiv had four schools: School of Physics and Mathematics, School of History and Philology, School of Medicine, School of Law. During the late 19th and early 20th centuries new faculty buildings and dormitories were erected with the support of sugar industrialist I. Kharytonenko.

=== Ukrainian SSR ===
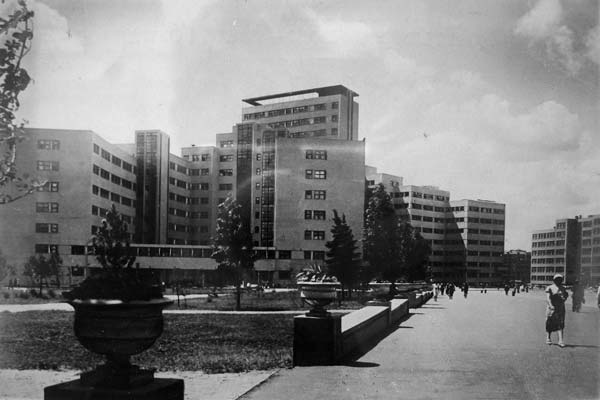
Constructivist House of Projects, 1930s before the university moved to it.

From 1917 to 1920, there was a struggle between advocates of the Ukrainian statehood and Russian course at the university. Some of the professors who opposed new political realities left. Most of the Ukrainian professors remained in Kharkiv. They continued working in the institutions founded by the Soviet government: the Academy of Theoretical Knowledge (1920–1921), Kharkiv Institute of Public Education (KhIPE, 1921–1930), Kharkiv Institute of National Economy, Institute of Physics and Chemistry, and Institute of Law. Kharkiv State University, consisting of seven schools — School of Physics and Mathematics, School of Chemistry, School of Biology, School of Geology and Geography, School of Literature and Linguistics (with Department of Philosophy), and School of Economy (with Department of Economic Geography) — was restored on their basis in 1932–1933.

In 1921, Kharkiv Medical Institute was founded based on the School of Medicine of the University of Kharkiv.

In 1936, the university was named after the late Russian writer Maxim Gorky, despite him not being related to the establishment during his life. During the German-Soviet war, it was evacuated to the city of Kizilord in Kazakhstan, where it merged with the Kyiv University to form the United Ukrainian State University. In 1943/44, the university returned to Kharkiv (the first academic year after the liberation of the city on 1 November 1943). In 1951, 800 university students suffered from persecution after they refused to pass exams in Russian. Court trials were held behind closed doors.

In 1977 the university had 12,000 students, including 300 foreigners. The following schools were operating in the university: School of Mechanics and Mathematics, School of Physics, School of Geology and Geography, School of Economy, School of History, School of Philology, School of Foreign Languages, School of General Sciences, School of Correspondence Learning, and Night School.

=== Independent Ukraine ===
On 11 October 1999, Leonid Kuchma, the President of Ukraine issued a decree, in which he, "taking into consideration considerable contribution that Kharkiv State University made to training qualified specialists and to development of science" granted the status of a national university and named it after its founder, Vasyl Karazin.

In 2004, the university was given a twin building (the former Govorov Academy), opposite Svobody Square.

During the Russian invasion of Ukraine shells hit the building of the Faculty of Economics which was subsequently destroyed by further Russian shelling. On 5 March the university sports complex was partially destroyed. On 11 March — the building of the Faculty of Physics and Technology was partially destroyed and on 18 March — the Institute of Public Administration was partially ruined. As of 22 March 2022, according to the university's press service, the university had no intact buildings left.

In total, the university suffered 12 billion hryvnias of damage as a result of the Russian invasion. Despite this, the establishment continued its educational and research activities. As of March 2026, the university had 13,332 students, of whom 11,314 studied in a remote mode, and 2,018 attended offline events. Many employees were forced to go on unpaid leaves due to the lack of government compensation for refugees temporarily residing in the university's dormitories. In June 2026 an underground safe space was established at the university with the aim of resuming in-person studies later that year.

== Cultural role ==
During the early period of its existence between 1805 and 1835, the university exerted great influence on educational development in Slobozhanshchyna. Its printing press, which was established simultaneously with the institution's foundation in 1804, played a big role in the development of Ukrainian literature, serving as the centre of Kharkiv Romantic School. It produced many notable publications, including Izmail Sreznevsky's Zaporozhian Antiquities (1833-1838), Ivan Kotliarevsky's Natalka Poltavka (1838), The Muscovite Sorcerer (1841) and Eneida (1842), as well as works by Hryhoriy Kvitka-Osnovianenko, Petro Hulak-Artemovsky and other authors.

The university played a major role in the Ukrainian national revival, producing ethnographic studies of Ukrainian lands and contributing to the development of Ukrainian literature and theatre. Its students formed a number of Ukrainian hromadas, and part of its professors argued against government limitations in respect to Ukrainian language. Among honorary doctors of the university were Mykhailo Hrushevsky, Ivan Franko and Olexandra Yefymenko. In 1907 the university started organizing lectures on topics of folklore, history of Ukraine and linguistics in the Ukrainian language.

== Campuses and buildings ==
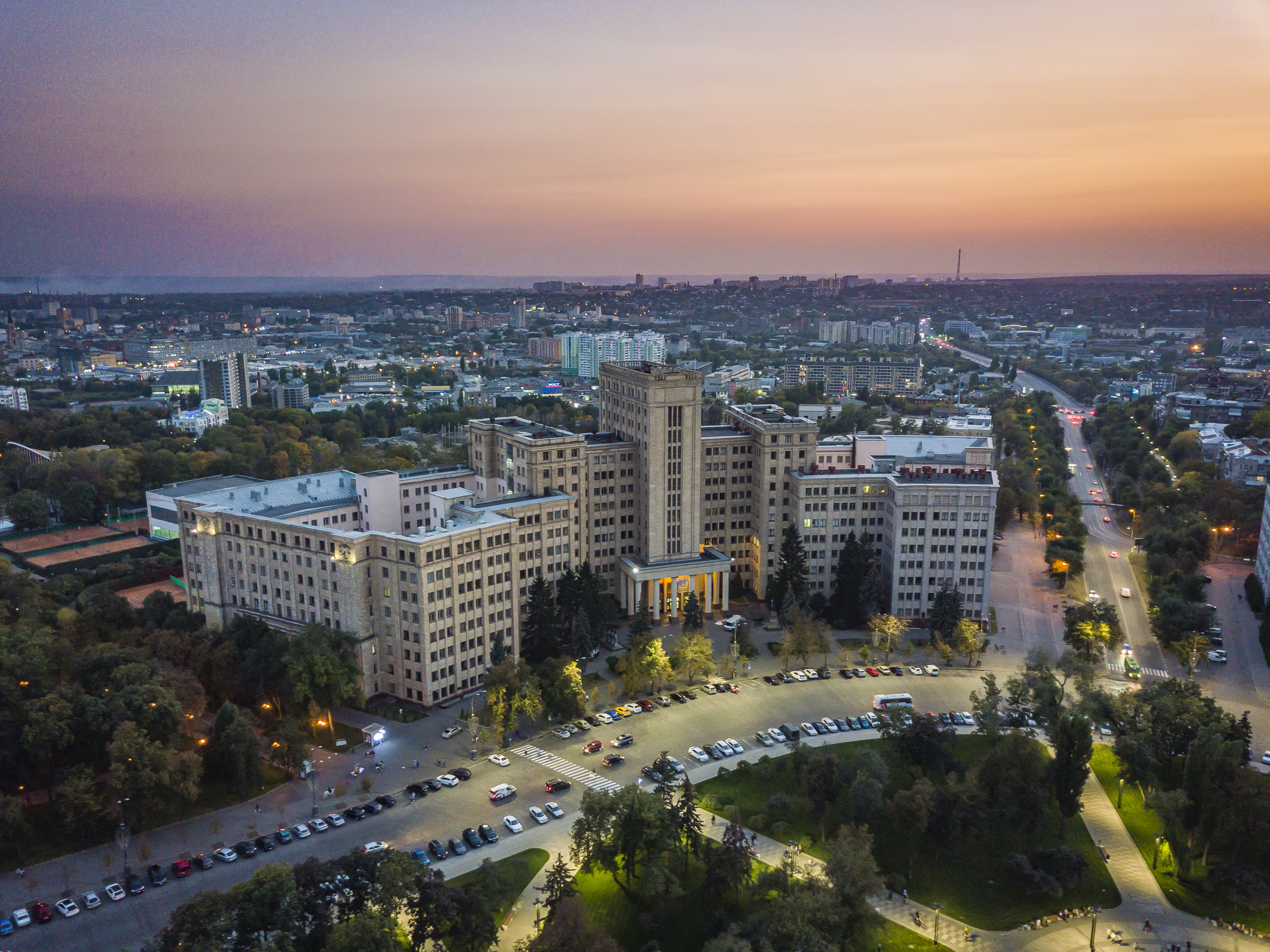
The main academic building

- Main building
- Northern building
- Central Scientific Library
- Students' Campus

== Ranking ==
University rankings

Global – Overall
- THE World: 477 (2021)

Under the Soviet Union, the University of Kharkiv was decorated the Order of the Red Banner of Labour, the Order of the October Revolution and the Order of Peoples' Friendship.

University rankings

Global – Overall
- QS World: 382 (2017)

Regional – Overall
- QS Emerging Europe and Central Asia: 23 (2024)

Kharkiv National University holds the second place in Ukraine in volume of publications and citations in scientific database Scopus and the Hirsch index, with the best academic results in the School of Medicine and School of Biology.

In 2017, according to QS World University Rankings, it is the best university in Ukraine and ranks as 382th university in the world. Also, in 2021, according to THE World University Rankings, it is the best university in Ukraine and ranks as 477th university in the world.

== Units ==
=== Departments ===
- School of Biology
- School of Chemistry
- School of Computer Sciences
- School of Ecology
- School of Economics
- School of International Economic Relations and Tourism
- School of Foreign Languages
- School of Medicine
- School of Geology, Geography, Recreation and Tourism
- School of History
- School Mechanics and Mathematics
- School of Law
- School of Physics
- School of Philology
- School of Philosophy
- School of Psychology
- School of Radiophysics
- School of Sociology
- Education and Research Institute of Ecology
- Education and Research Institute "Karazin Banking Institute"
- Education and Research Institute "Institute of Public Administration"
- Education and Research Institute "Karazin Business School"
- Institute of International Education for Study and Research
- Ukrainian Engineering Pedagogics Academy

=== Institute of High Technologies ===
- School of Physics and Technology
- School of Computer Science
- School of Energy Physics

=== Scientific institutions ===
- Kharkiv University History Museum
- State Natural History Museum of National University of Kharkiv
- The Museum of Archaeology
- The Museum of Astronomy (Hosted by the Institute of Astronomy)

== Notable alumni and professors ==
Notable alumni of Kharkiv University

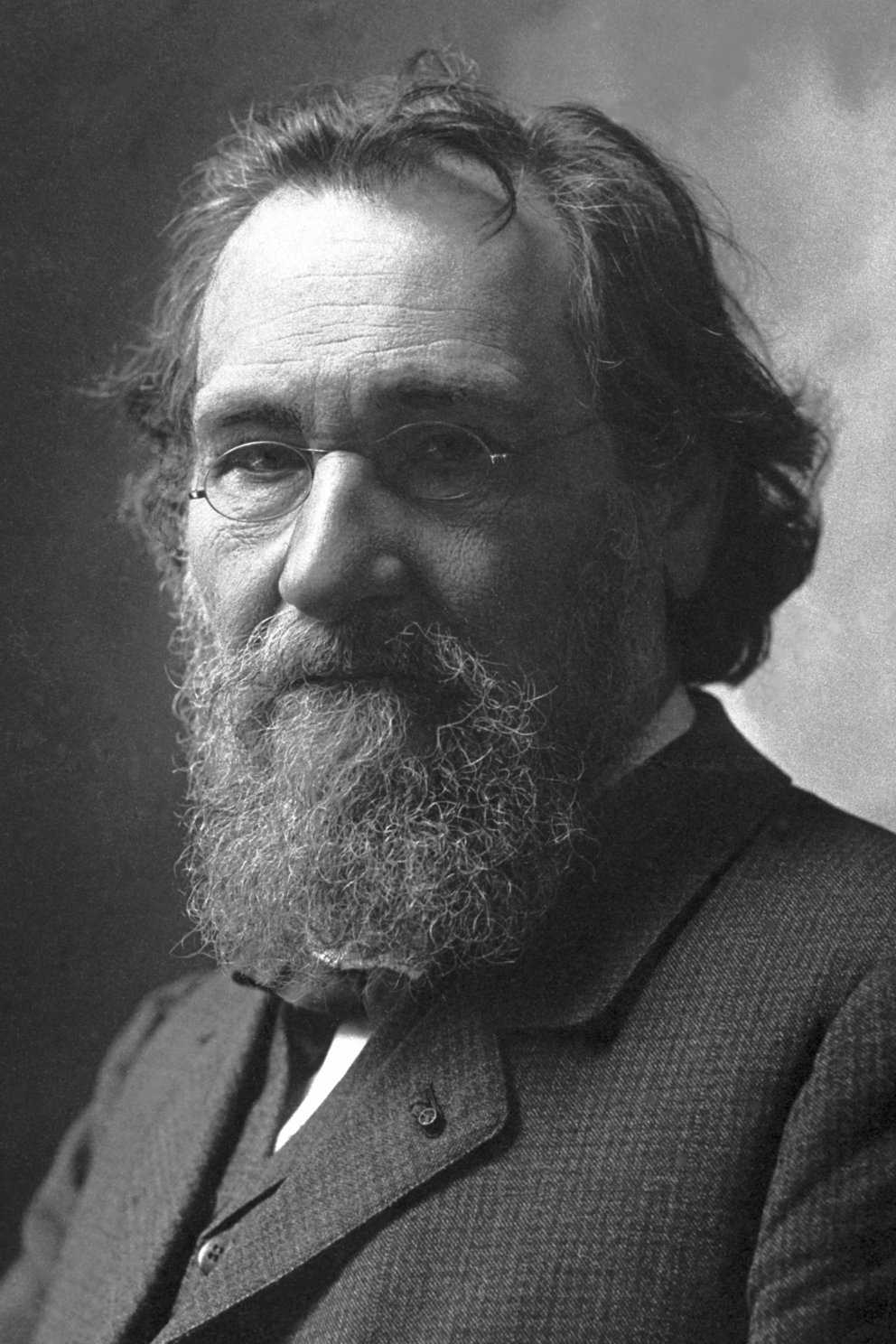
Élie Metchnikoff

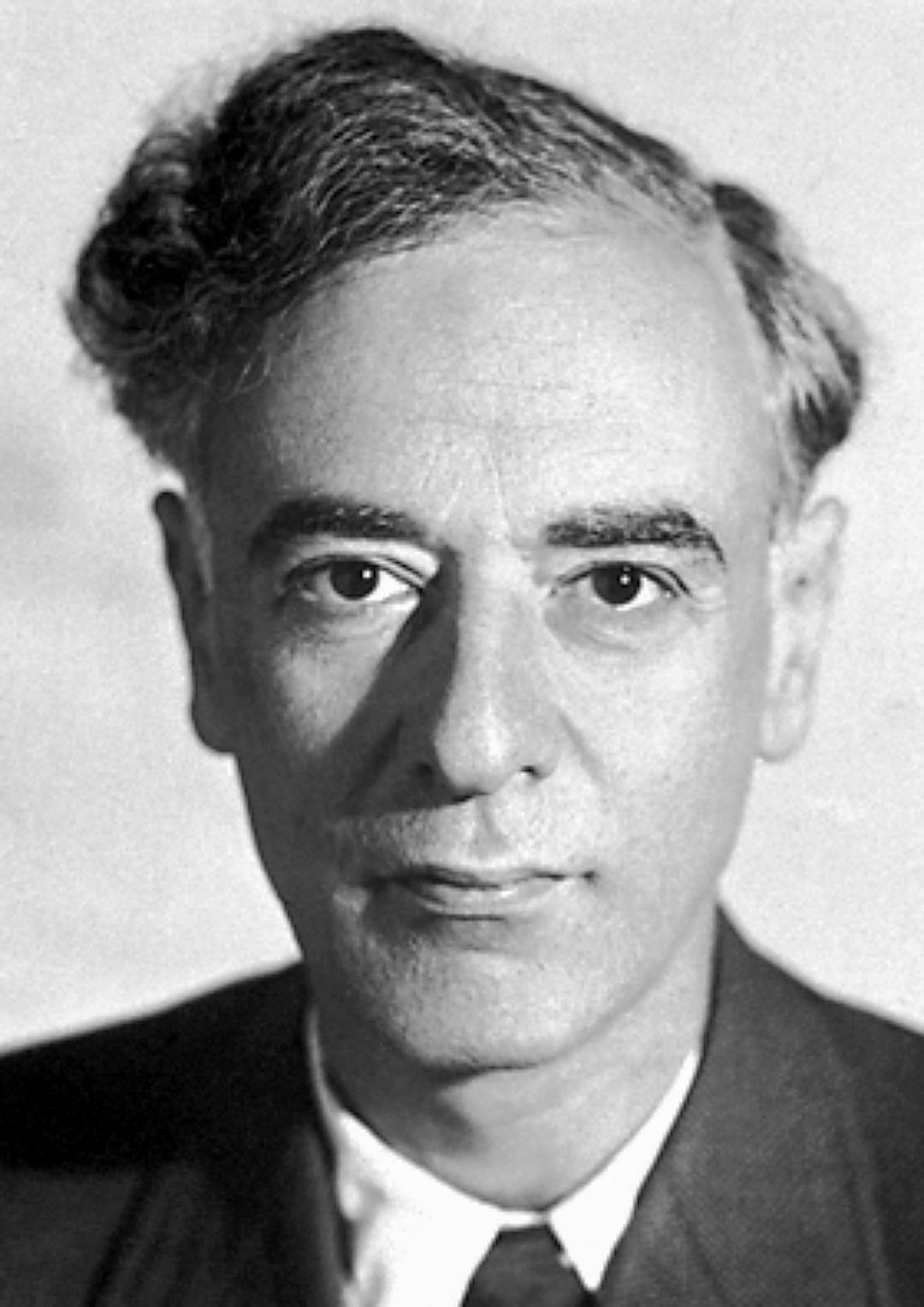
Lev Landau

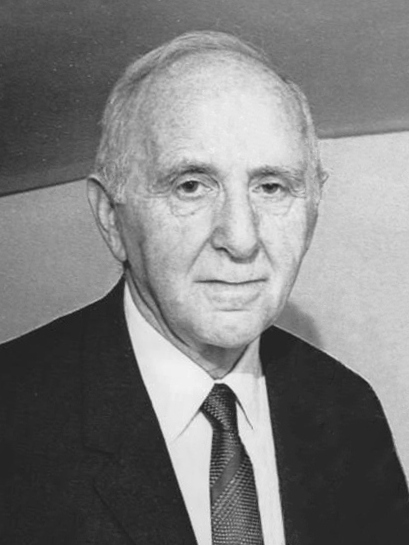
Simon Kuznets

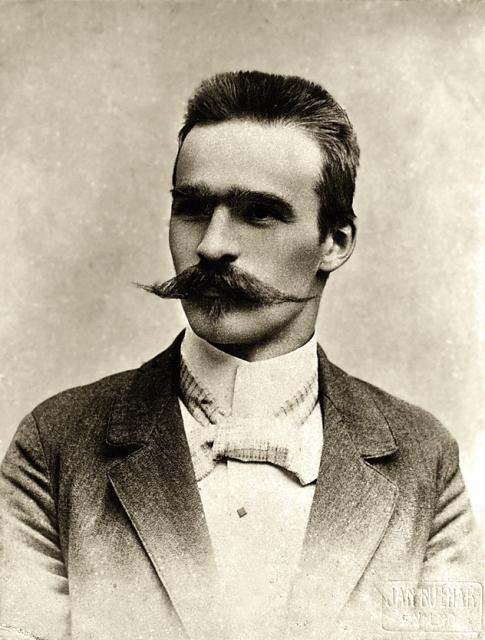
Józef Piłsudski

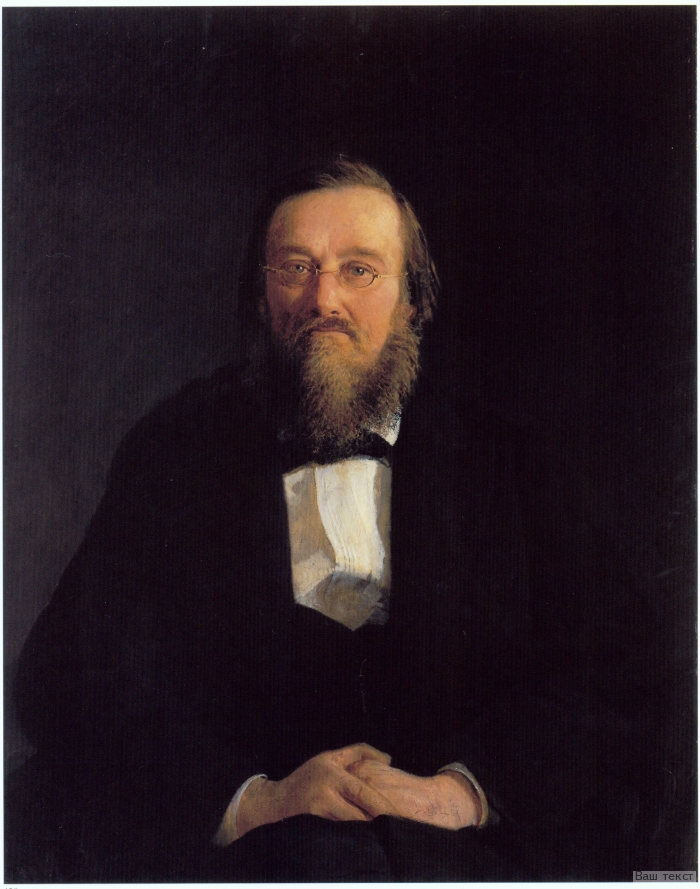
Mykola Kostomarov

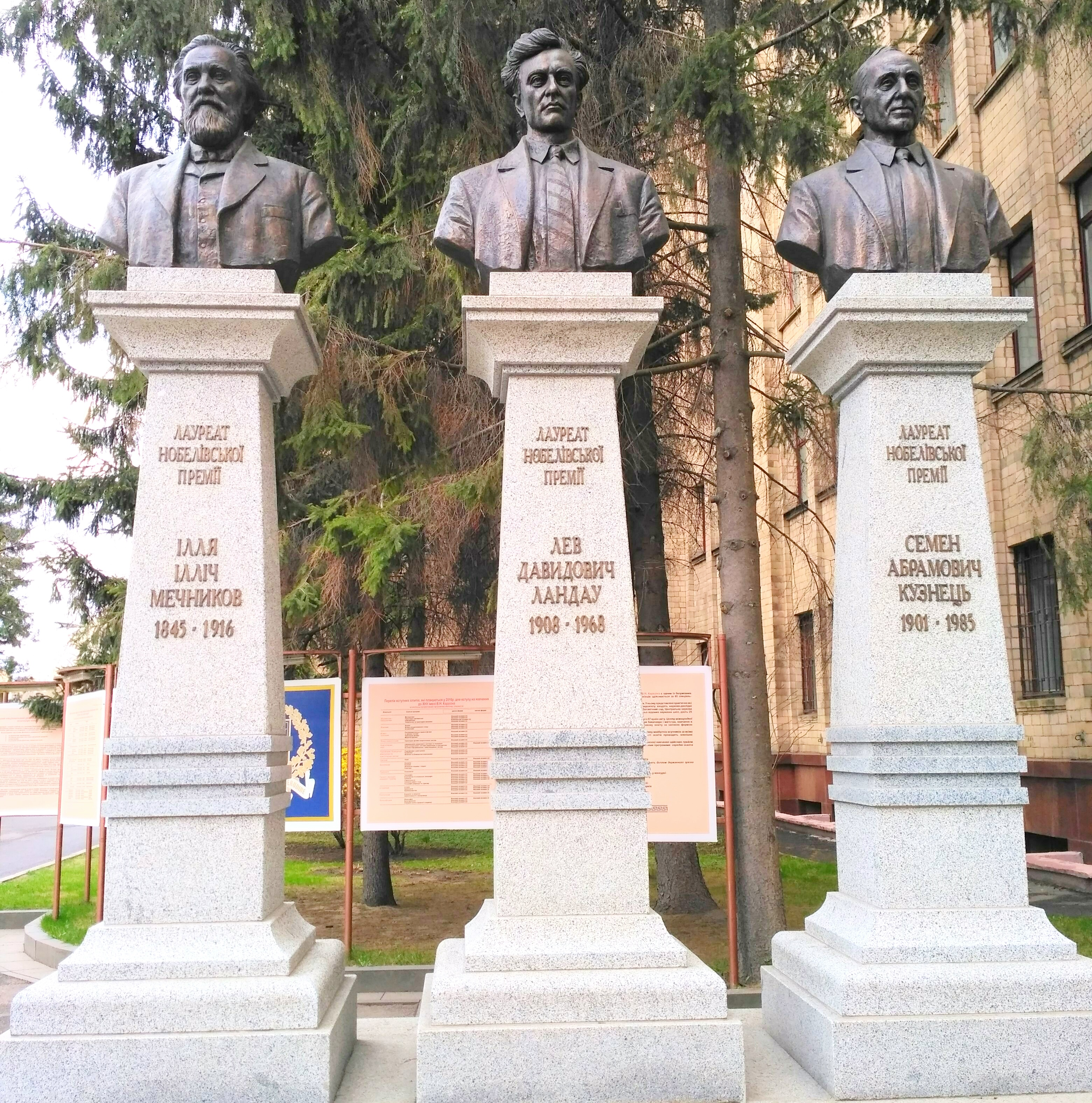
Monument to Élie Metchnikoff, Lev Landau, Simon Kuznets

=== Nobel Prize winners ===
- Élie Metchnikoff (Medicine, 1908)
- Lev Landau (Physics, 1962)
- Simon Kuznets (Economic Sciences, 1971)

=== Others ===
- Aleksandr Akhiezer, physicist
- Naum Akhiezer, mathematician
- Vladimir Arnoldi, botanist
- Petro Hulak-Artemovsky, historian
- Nikolay Beketov, chemist
- Sergei Natanovich Bernstein, mathematician
- Vasily Danilewsky, chemist
- Mikhail Khalansky, linguist
- Mykola Kostomarov, historian
- Maksim Kovalevsky, sociologist
- Peter von Köppen, statistician
- Andrei Krasnov, botanist
- Vasily Krylov, pathologist
- Volodymyr Levytsky, statistician
- Evsei Liberman, economist
- Evgeny Lifshitz, physicist
- Aleksandr Lyapunov, mathematician
- Volodymyr Marchenko, mathematician
- Jerzy Neyman, mathematician and statistician
- Timofei Osipovsky, mathematician
- Mikhail Ostrogradsky, mathematician
- Vladimir Palladin, botanist
- Józef Piłsudski, Chief of State of Poland, first Marshal of Poland
- Aleksei Pogorelov, mathematician
- Alexander Potebnja, linguist
- George Shevelov, linguist
- Dmitrii Sintsov, mathematician
- Izmail Sreznevsky, philologist
- Mykola Sumtsov, ethnographer
- Anton Sushkevich, mathematician
- Ivan Svitlychnyi, Ukrainian literary critic and Soviet dissident
- Boris Gourevitch, author, activist
- Roza Sarkisyan, theatre director
- Tito Vanzetti, medical professor
- Sergiy Vilkomir, computer scientist
- Marta Fiedina, synchro swimmer
- Maria Burmaka, singer, musician
- Anton Korobov, chess Grandmaster
- Petr Shatilov, physician

== Rectors ==
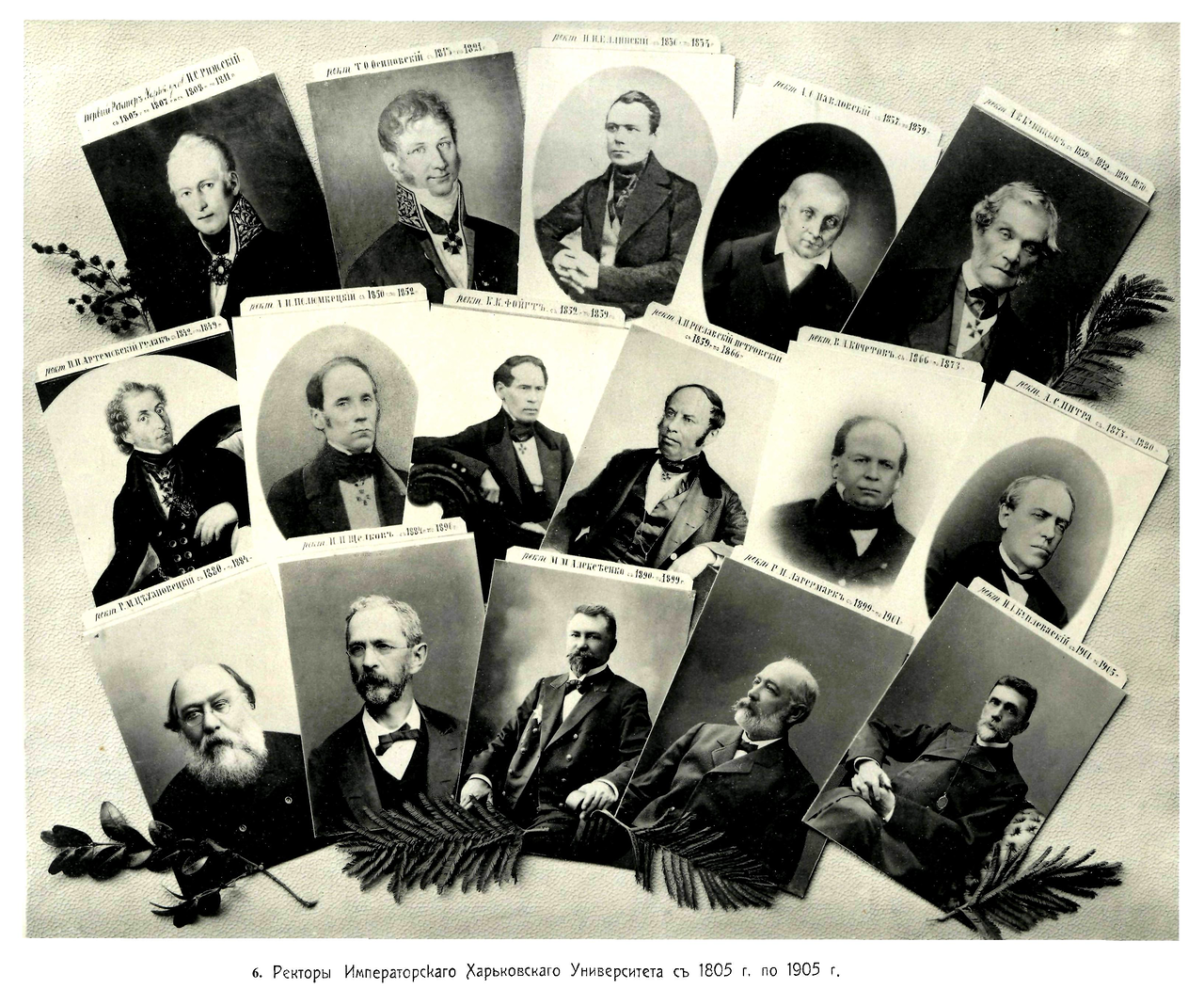
Rectors of Kharkiv University from 1805 to 1905

- 1805—1806, 1808—1811 Ivan Rizhsky
- 1807—1808, 1811—1813 Atanasije Stojković
- 1813—1820 Timofei Osipovsky
- 1821—1826 Vasily Dzhunkovsky
- 1826—1829, 1833—1836 Johan Christian Kroneberg
- 1829—1830 Andrej Dudrovich
- 1830—1833 Nikolai Yellinsky
- 1836—1837 Vasily Komlishinsky
- 1837—1838 Andrey Pavlovsky
- 1839—1841, 1849—1850, 1852—1853 Alexey Kunitsyn
- 1841—1849 Petro Hulak-Artemovskyi
- 1850—1852, 1872—1873 Alexander Paliumbetsky
- 1853—1859 Karl Voigt
- 1859—1862 Alexander Roslavsky-Petrovsky
- 1862—1872 Vladimir Kochetov
- 1873—1881 Adolphe Pitra
- 1881—1884 Grigory Tsekhanovetsky
- 1884—1890 Ivan Shchelkov
- 1890—1899 Mikhail Alekseyenko
- 1899—1901 Herman Lagermarck
- 1901—1905 Nikolay Kuplevasky
- 1905—1906 Ludwig Reinhard
- 1906—1911 Dmytro Bahalii
- 1912—1918 Ivan Netushil
- 1918—1919 Porfiry Pyatnitsky
- 1919—1920 Vladimir Levitsky
- 1920—1922 Anthony-Boniface Psheborskyi
- 1922—1924 Semen Strelbytskyi
- 1924—1930 Myroslav Gavrylov
- 1930—1934 Yakov Bludov
- 1934—1937 Oleksiy Neforosny
- 1937—1938 Lazar Gurevich
- 1938—1941 Oleksandr Sazonov
- 1941—1942 Andriy Zhelehovskyi
- 1942—1943 Mykhailo Vetukhov
- 1943 Oleksiy Rusko
- 1943—1945 Nikolai Barabashov
- 1945—1960 Ivan Bulankin
- 1960—1966 Volodymyr Lavrushyn
- 1966—1975 Volodymyr Khotkevych
- 1975—1993 Ivan Tarapov
- 1993—1998 Vasyl Svich
- 1998—2021 Vil Bakirov
- 2021—present Tetiana Kahanovska

== See also ==
- Kharkiv Linguistic School
- Open access in Ukraine
- List of modern universities in Europe (1801–1945)
- List of universities in Ukraine
