= Timofei Osipovsky =

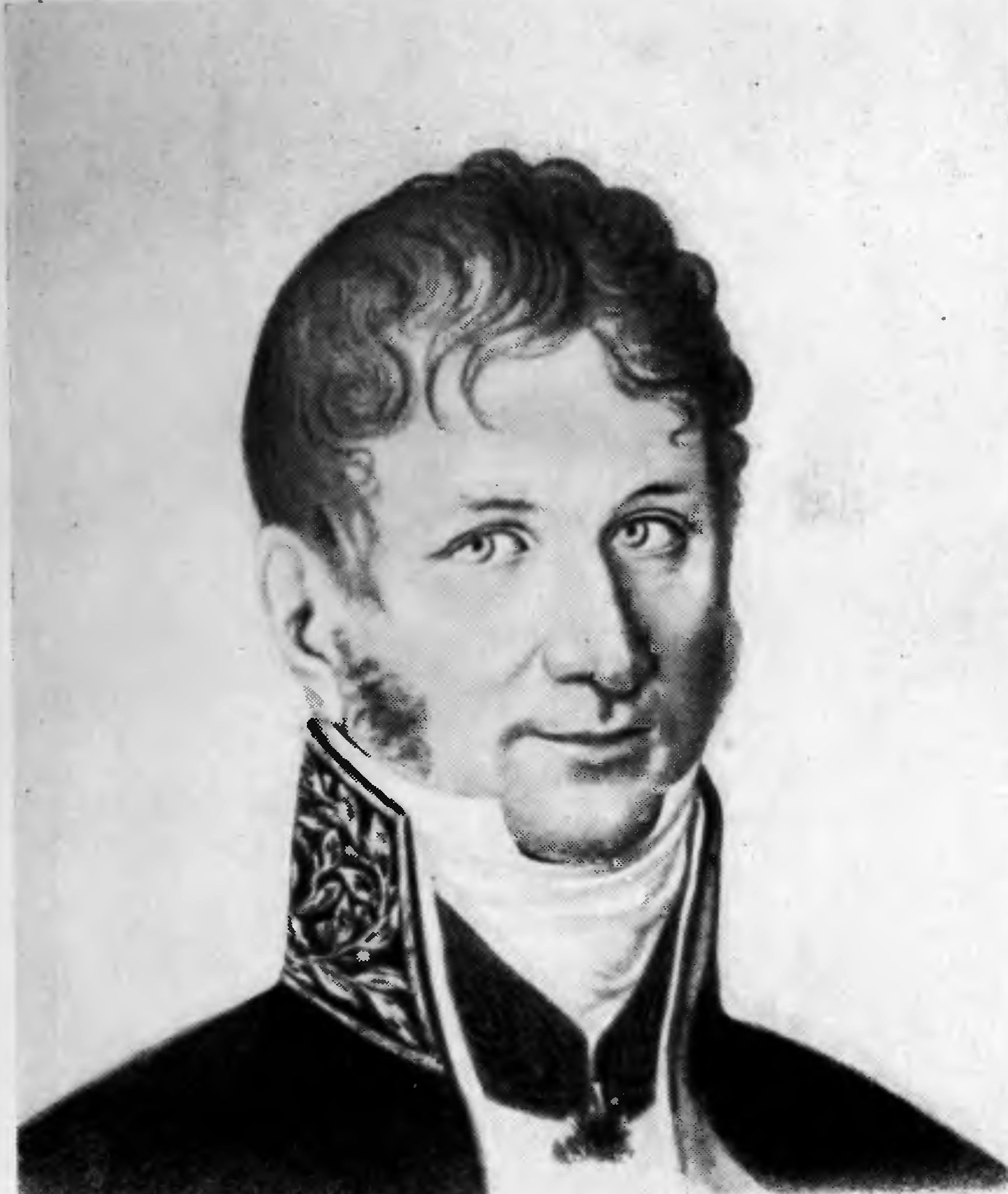
Timofey Fedorovic Osipovsky

Timofei Fyodorovich Osipovsky (Russian: Тимофей Федорович Осиповский; February 2, 1766, Osipovo – June 24, 1832, Moscow) was a Russian Imperial mathematician, physicist, astronomer, and philosopher.

Timofei Osipovsky graduated from the St Petersburg Teachers Seminary. He became a teacher at Imperial Kharkov University, in 1805, the year it was founded. The city of Kharkov, thanks to its educational establishments, became one of the most important cultural and educational centres of Russian Empire. In 1813 he became rector of the university. However, in 1820, Osipovsky was suspended from his post on religious grounds.

Osipovsky's most famous work was the three volume book A Course of Mathematics (1801–1823), which soon became a standard university text and was used in universities for many years.
