= Oleksandr Lushpynskyi =

Ukrainian architect, painter (1878–1943)

- Олександр Онуфрійович Лушпинський
- Born: 11 July 1878; Butsniv, now Ternopil Oblast, Ukraine
- Died: 20 November 1943 (aged 65); Lviv
- Education: Lviv Imperial and Royal Polytechnic School
- Occupations: Architect, painter

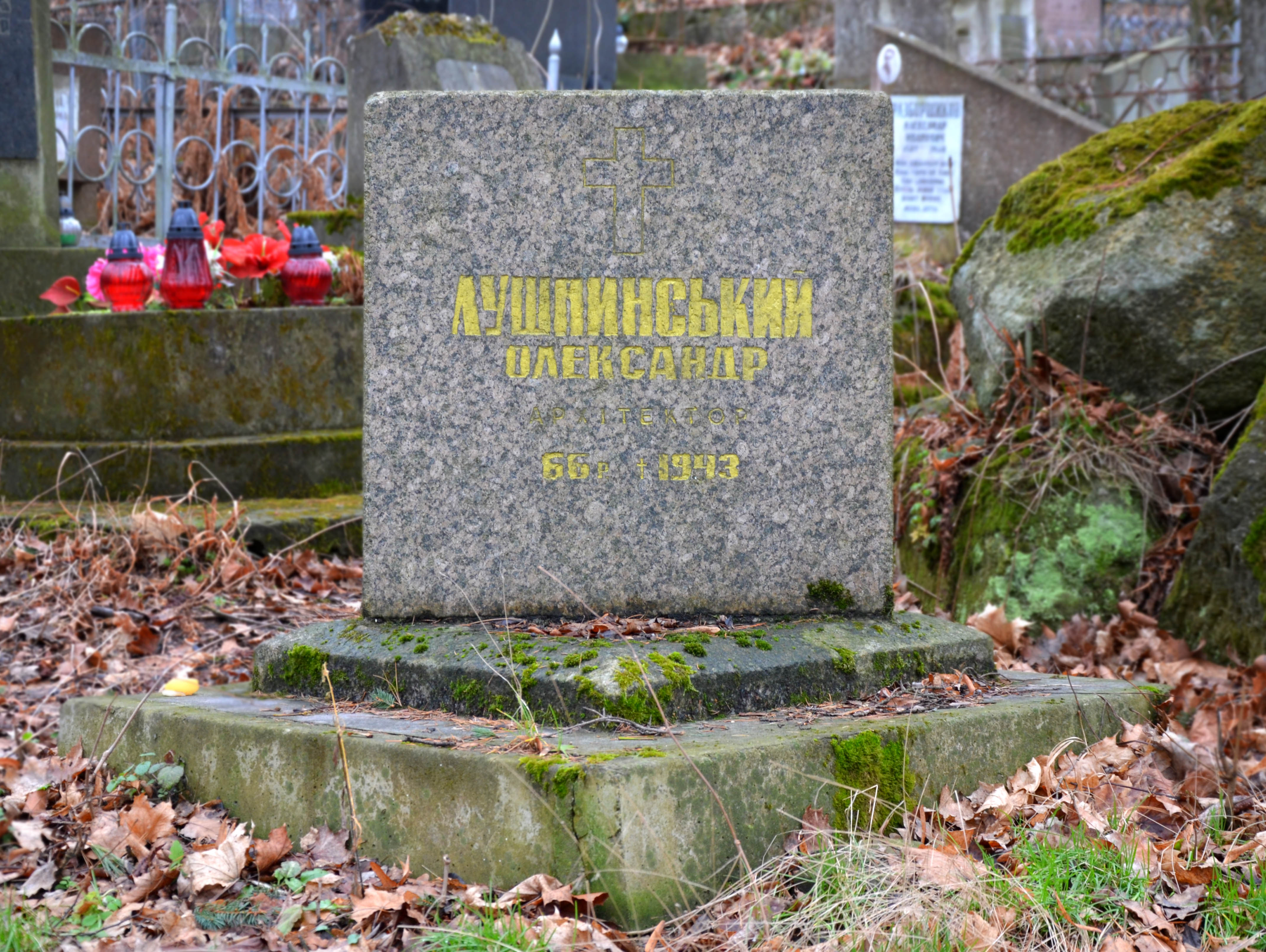
Grave of Oleksandr Lushpynskyi in Lychakiv Cemetery.

Oleksandr Lushpynskyi (Ukrainian: Олександр Онуфрійович Лушпинський; 11 July 1878 – 20 November 1943), Ukrainian architect, painter.

== Biography ==
Lushpynskyi was born on 11 July 1878 in the village of Butsniv in the Ternopil Oblast into a blacksmith's family. He studied at the Ternopil Gymnasium, and from 1898 to 1904, at the architecture department of the Lviv Imperial and Royal Polytechnic School (now the Lviv Polytechnic). Among his teachers was Ivan Levynskyi.

From 1904 to 1919, Lushpynskyi worked at Levynskyi's firm, where he was the author or co-author of a number of buildings constructed by the firm. In many cases, the extent of his involvement in specific projects is difficult to determine.

He was involved in efforts to develop a Ukrainian architectural style, in line with the emergence of national styles in Europe at the time. He applied Otto Wagner ideas in architecture.

The style of Lushpynsky's buildings, with elements of folk styles, is often characterized as "Hutsul Secession". Many buildings are designed in the spirit of Byzantine-Romanesque stylizations. He studied folk wooden construction and sketched examples of Hutsul and Boiko buildings (now preserved in the Andrey Sheptytsky National Museum of Lviv). He exhibited his sketches of wooden churches at the first architectural exhibition in Lviv in 1910. In 1915, he organized a personal exhibition at the National Museum. Later, the State Commission for the Reconstruction of the Region published an album of designs for residential and public buildings for villages. In 1920, he published an album of drawings entitled "Wooden Churches of Galicia in the 16th-18th Centuries".

In 1930, Metropolitan Andrey Sheptytsky appointed Lushpynskyi to the position of restorer and member of the conservation commission of the Greek Catholic Metropolis. In the fall of 1932, together with Ilarion Svientsitskyi, Volodymyr Sichynskyi, and Mariia Strutynska, he participated in the preparation of materials for the restoration of St. George's Cathedral in Lviv on behalf of the Metropolitan Chapter. Member of the jury for the competition for the reconstruction of the Holy Spirit church in Lviv (1942).

He died on 20 November 1943 and was buried in Lychakiv Cemetery. Over time, his grave was lost. In 2004, employees of the Lychakiv Cemetery Museum-Reserve identified the burial site in field No. 18 and erected a tombstone. In 1993, a street in Lviv, in the Riasne microdistrict, was named after Lushpynskyi.

== Architecture ==
- House of Culture in the village of Butsniv, Ternopil Oblast. Built in the early 20th century, the building was constructed in the Ukrainian Art Nouveau style with elements of Ukrainian wooden Secession (shingled roof, decorative tiles, and wooden structures). During the renovation of the House of Culture in the 1960s, the structure and appearance of the building were changed, and the decorative Secession elements were removed.
- The People's House in Kopychyntsi, Ternopil Oblast. Built in 1903–1905. The facade features Secessionist-style pointed Romanesque-Byzantine stylizations.
- The building of the Dnister Credit Union in Lviv, on the corner of Ruska and Pidvalna Streets (1904–1905, co-authored).
- Y. Skvarczynskyi's house at 11a General Chuprynka Street in Lviv (1906–1907). The authorship is attributed to Tadeusz Obmiński and Oleksandr Lushpynskyi.
- The bursary of the Narodny Dom Institute at 14 and 14a Lysenka Street in Lviv (1906–1907).
- Saint Demetrius church in the village of Obroshyne, Lviv Oblast (1906–1907).
- The former sanatorium of Kazimierz Solecki at 107 Lychakivska Street in Lviv. Built by Ivan Levynskyi's company in 1908. Mieczysław Orłowicz claimed that it was built in the Zakopane Style.
- The villa of lawyer Roman Kovshevych on Vyshensky Street in Lviv. Probable author — O. Lushpynskyi.
- The building of the gymnasium and dormitory of the Ukrainian Pedagogical Society in Lviv (1906–1908).
- The People's House in Kamianka-Buzka (1910–1911).
- Memorial sign (cross) to the 50th anniversary of the death of Taras Shevchenko in the village of Burdiakivtsi, Ternopil Oblast (1911).
- Monument to Markiian Shashkevych in the village of Pidlyssia, Lviv Oblast (1911). Made in the metalworking workshop of Mykhailo Stefanivskyi.
- The villa of painter Ivan Trush on Ivan Trush Street in Lviv (1910, now a memorial museum dedicated to the artist).
- The People's House in the village of Klepariv near Lviv (1910–1911, now 1 Sosiura Street).
- The Church of the Intercession in Cherneliv-Ruskyi, Ternopil Oblast (1912).
- The brick Church of the Holy Eucharist in the village of Borynia. It has a cruciform plan and one storey. It has a square nave, a polygonal altar with two sacristies, shortened side arms, and a narthex with an open arcade. The nave is crowned with an octagonal dome, and the arms and narthex have a gable roof. The facades are made of hewn stone and are unplastered. Built in 1912. Lushpynskyi was probably also the designer of the iconostasis.
- The building of the school and monastery of the Basilian Sisters in Stanyslaviv (now Ivano-Frankivsk) on what is now Vasyliianok Street (1910–1913).
- The Church of the Translation of the Relics of Saint Nicholas in Seredynky, Ternopil Oblast (1913), stylized in Byzantine-Romanesque forms.
- Architectural part of the monument to Taras Shevchenko in Vynnyky near Lviv (1913).
- The building of the Ukrainian Music Society named after M. Lysenko at 5 Shashkevych Square in Lviv (1913–1916), co-authors Yevhen Chervynskyi, Ivan Levynskyi, Tadeusz Obmiński, painter Modest Sosenko, sculptor Hryhorii Kuznevych.
- Project for a presbytery in Ułazów (1916).
- Unrealized project for a new building for the National Museum of Lviv (ca. 1917–1918). Designed at the request of Ilarion Svientsitskyi.
- Ivan Levynskyi's tombstone in Lychakiv Cemetery. The design, in the form of a sarcophagus with a broken Romanesque capital, was selected in a competition in 1920. It is made of sandstone.
- Unrealized project to rebuild the war-damaged stone church in Komarno (1923).
- The wooden church of Saint Nicholas in Nove Selo, Lviv Raion. Built in 1923–1924. Traditional three-part, single-story with a high square tower on a square nave.
- The project of the Holy Trinity church in the village of Pyshkivtsi. In the spring of 1925, the church was mentioned in the newspaper Dilo as being under construction.
- Fence of Saint Nicholas church in Lviv (1926).
- The tombstone on the grave of Bohdan and Yosyp Tanchakovskyi's in Lychakiv Cemetery (1929). A stylized trident and crosses of the Sich Riflemen were carved on the white sandstone wall. The original design also included neo-baroque ornamentation.
- The tombstone of Ivan Belei at Lychakiv Cemetery in Lviv. Made by the Tyrovych company in the 1930s.
- Restoration of the wooden Holy Trinity church in Sykhiv. During 1932, the church was raised on its foundations, the bell tower above the narthex was dismantled, and the shingles were replaced.
- A brick church in the village of Styborivka. Designed in 1937. Construction was carried out by builder Vasyl Khomitskyi. Construction, interrupted by the war, was only completed in 1990. The church has a cruciform plan, is single-story, with a polygonal altar and two symmetrical sacristies.
- Church design for the village of Uhersko in the Stryi Raion.
- Project of the Osnova student society building.
- The bell tower of the Church of the Resurrection in Vynnyky, built in 1925, is in the modernized Baroque style.
- Design of the wooden Saint Mykyta church, built in the village of Mykytyntsi, Ivano-Frankivsk Raion (1922–1923).

== Faleristics ==
The author of the award design is the Ukrainian Sich Riflemen Cross "S. U. S. 1914"

== Gallery ==
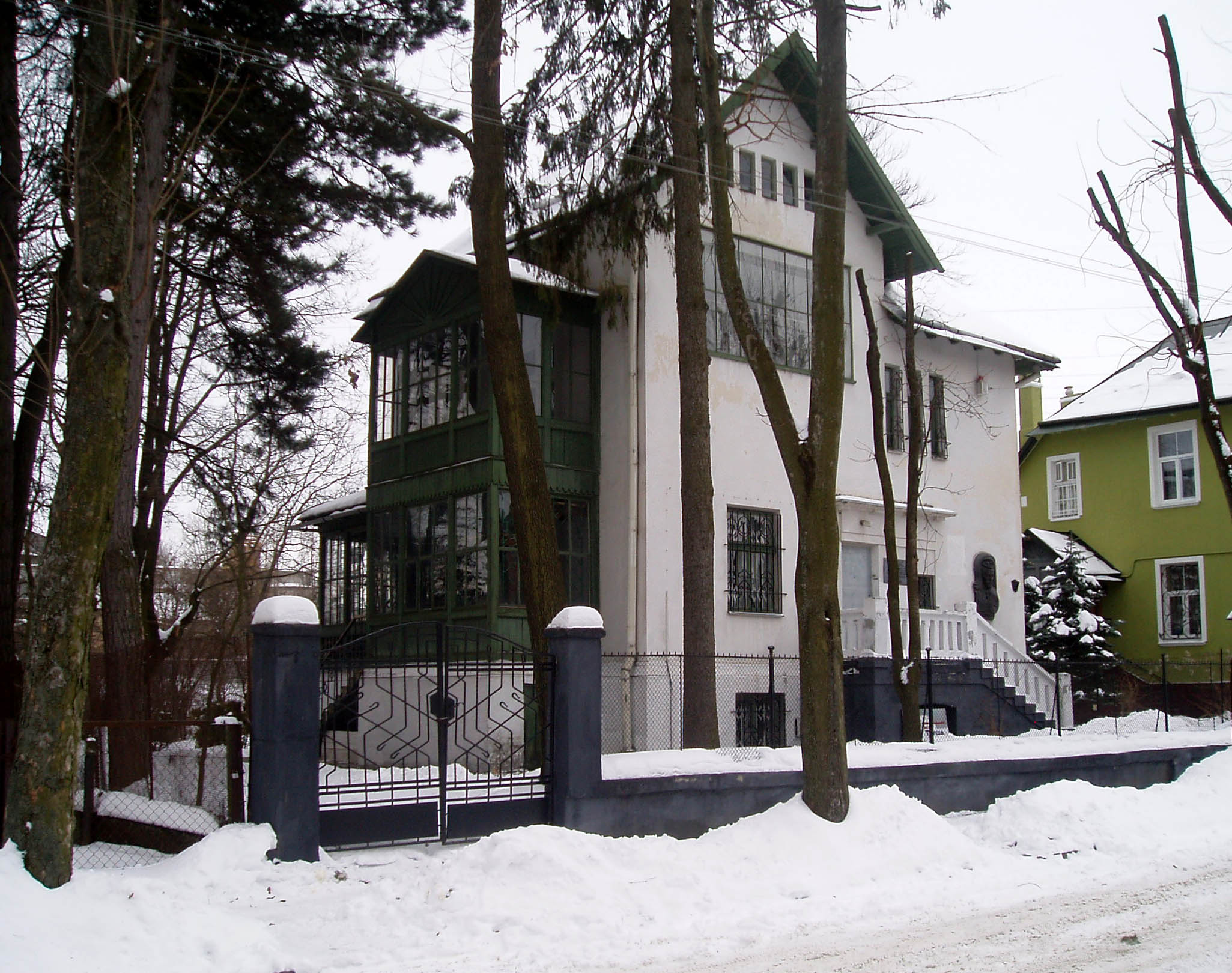
Former villa of Ivan Trush

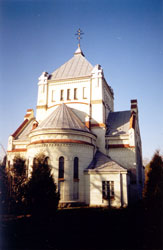
Church in Obroshyne

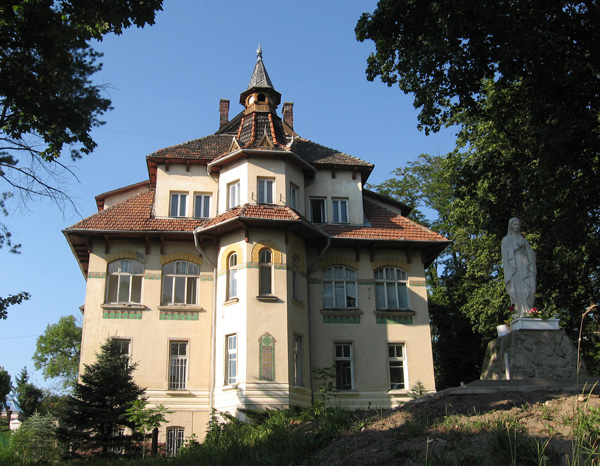
Former Soletskyi Clinic (Lychakivska Street, Lviv)

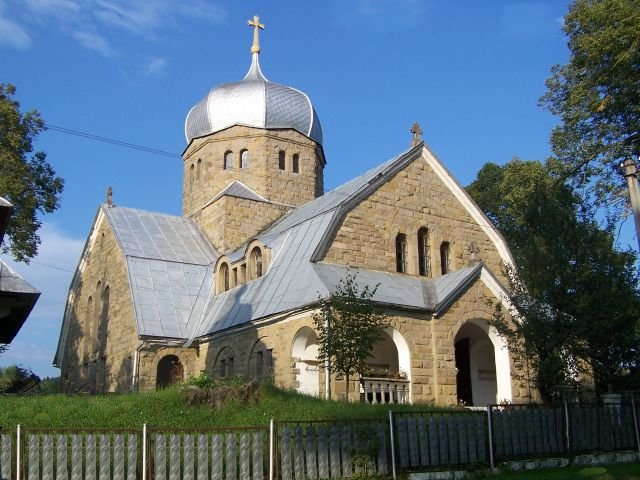
Church in Borynia

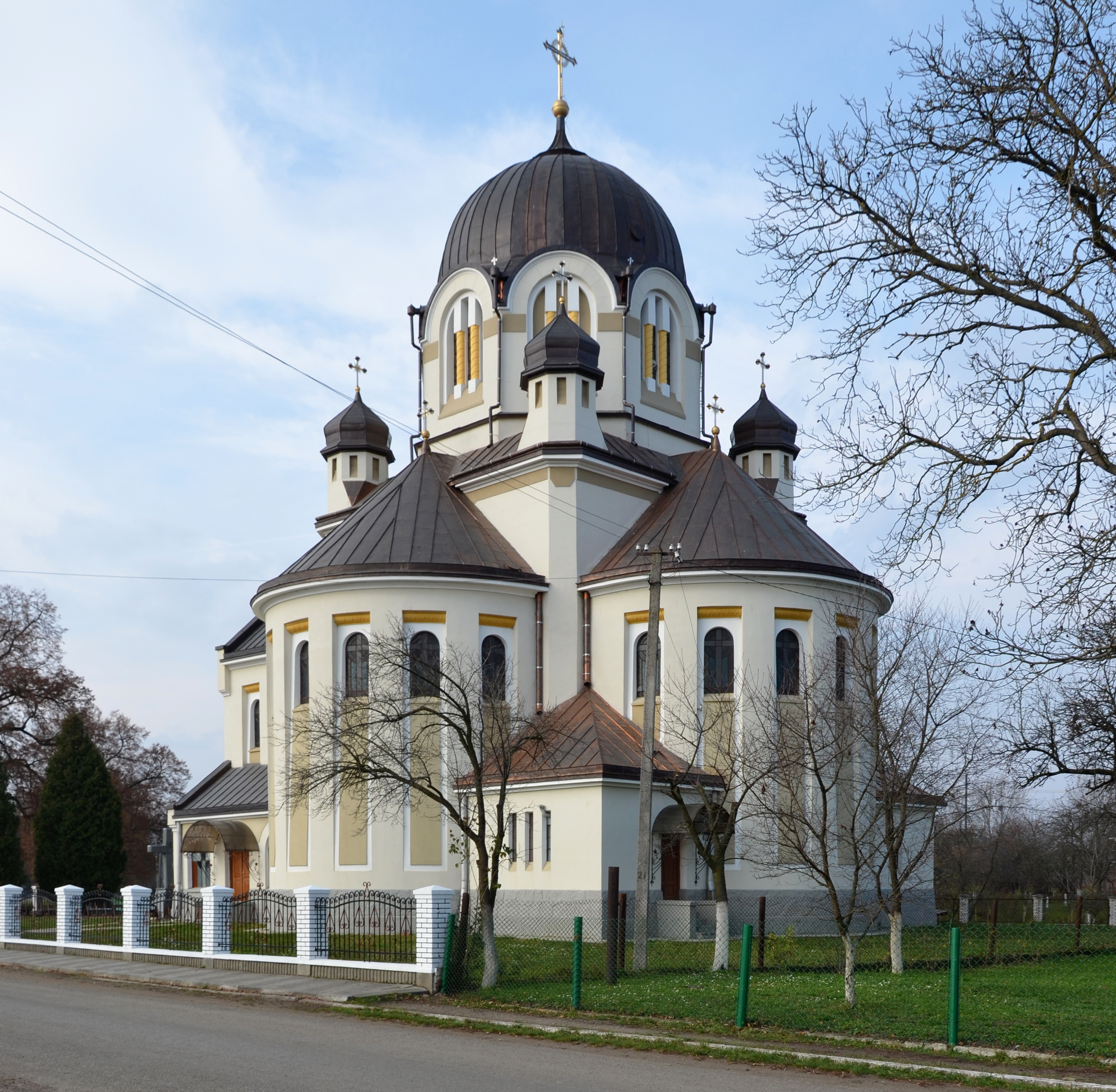
Church in Uhersko

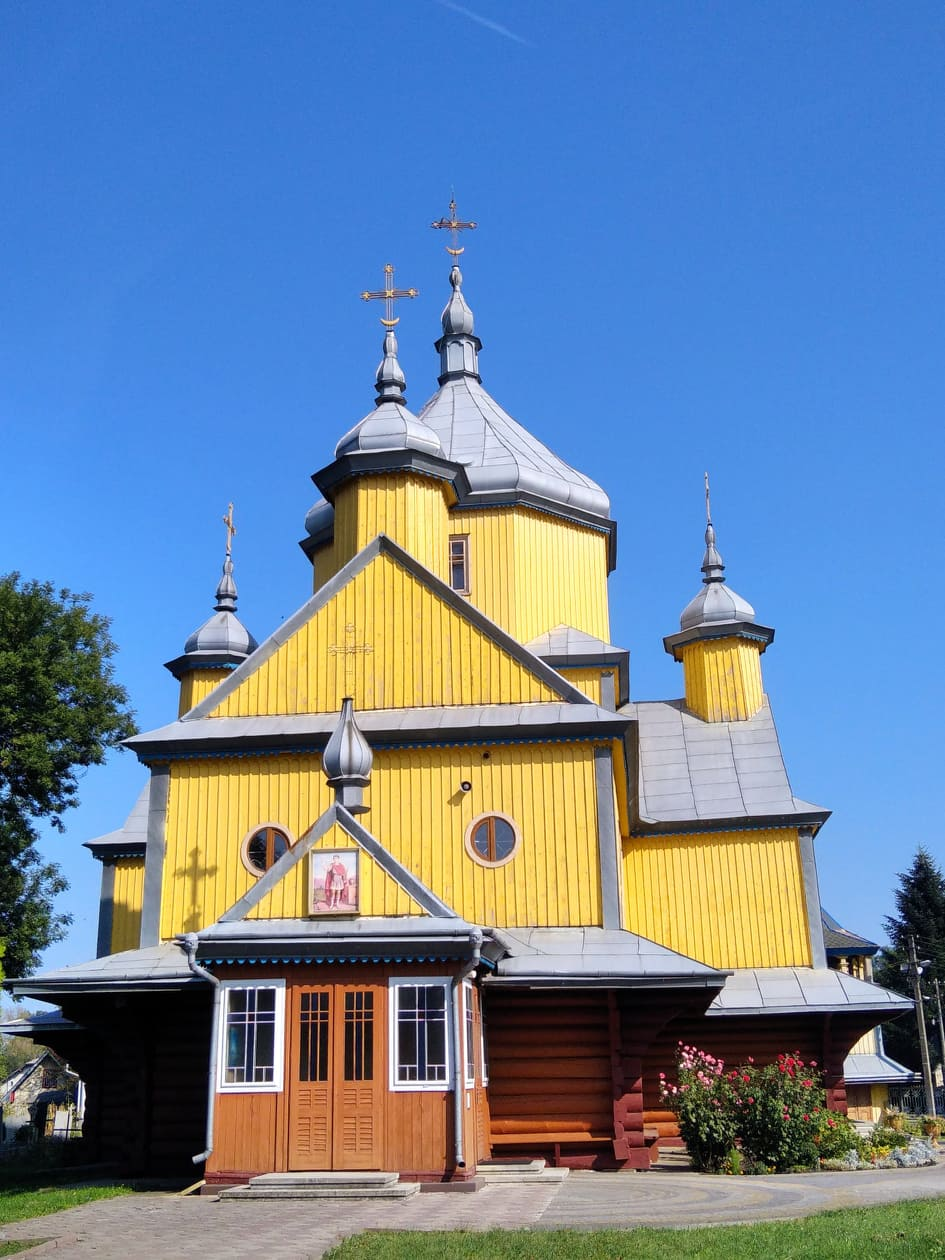
Saint Mykyta church in Mykytyntsi

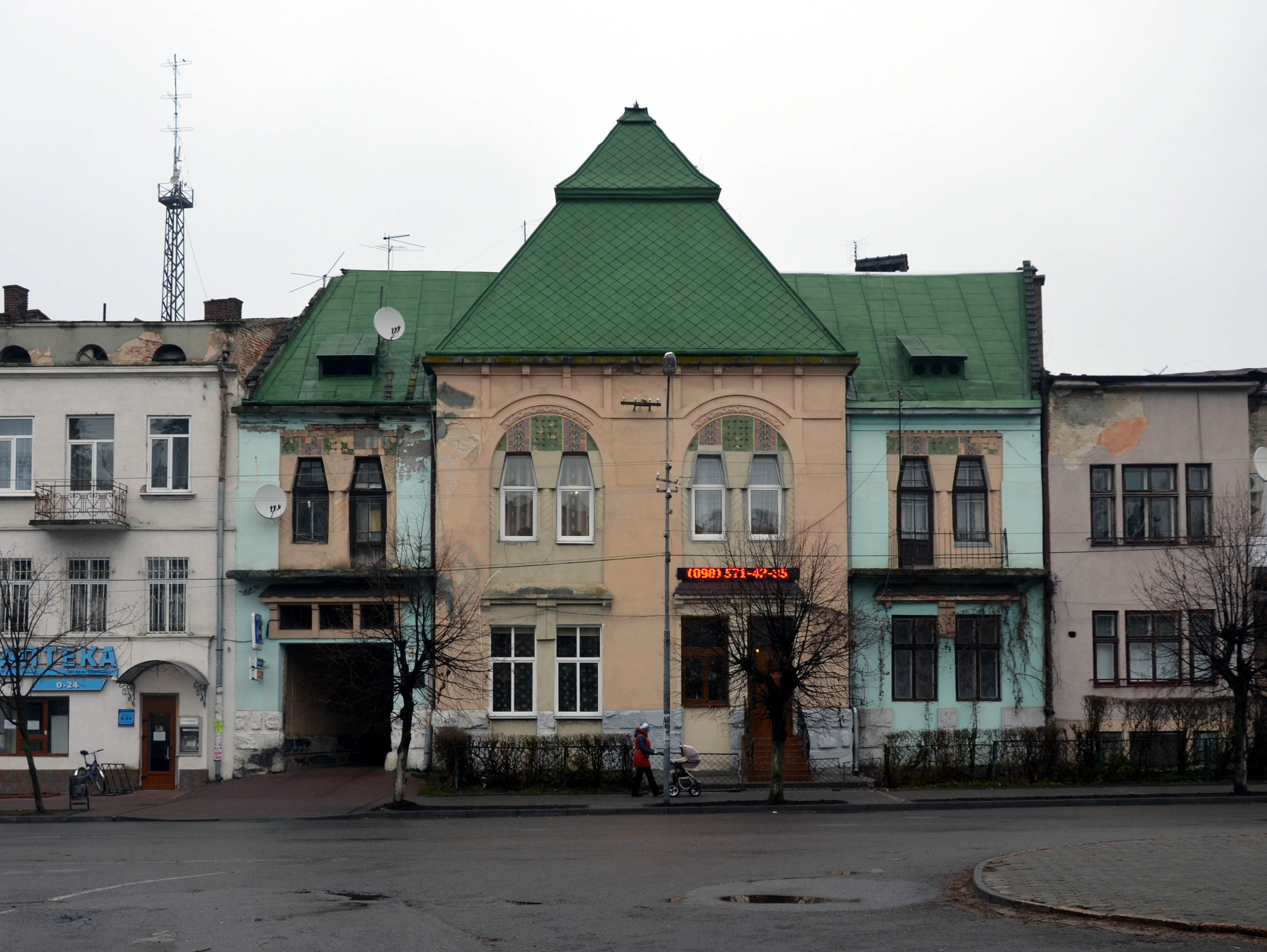
People's House in Kamianka-Buzka

== See also ==
- Hutsul Secession
- Ukrainian Art Nouveau

== Bibliography ==
- Новосядлий Б. Перший пам'ятник кобзареві на Тернопіллі // Вісник Львівської національної академії мистецтв. — 2014. — Вип. 25. — С. 133–138.
- Чепелик В. Визначні майстри українського архітектурного модерну // Український архітектурний модерн / В. В. Чепелик; упоряд. З. В. Мойсеєнко-Чепелик; Всеукр. фонд відтвор. видат. пам'яток іст.-архіт. спадщини ім. О. Гончара, Київ. нац. ун-т буд-ва і архітектури. — К. : КНУБА, 2000.
