= Memorial sign (cross) to the 50th anniversary of the death of Taras Shevchenko =

Memorial in Burdiakivtsi, Ukraine

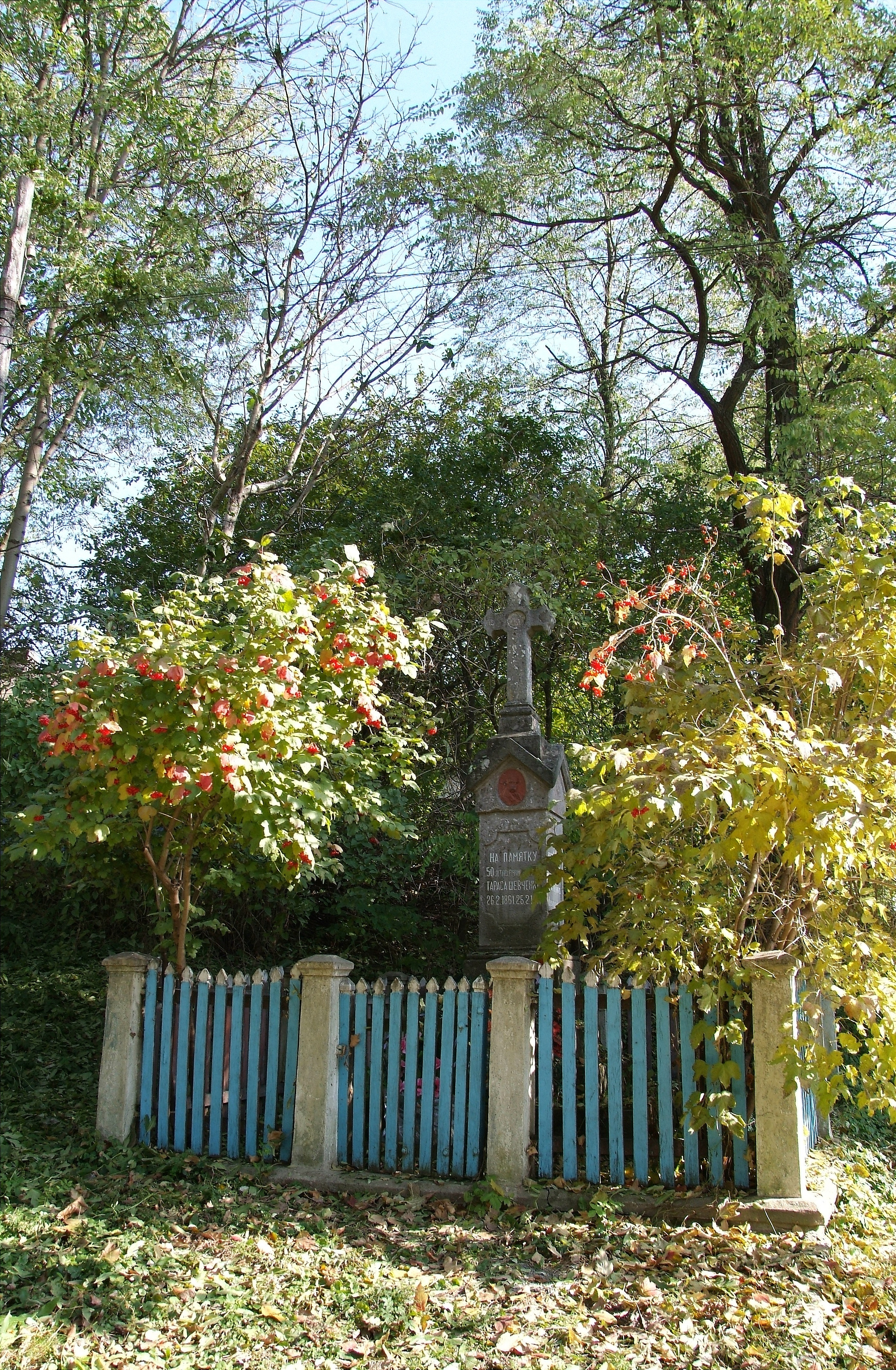
- Completion date: 1911
- Type: memorial sign (cross)
- Location: Burdiakivtsi, Skala-Podilska settlement hromada, Chortkiv Raion, Ternopil Oblast, Ukraine; 48°53′38.2″N 26°09′32″E

The memorial sign (cross) to the 50th anniversary of the death of Taras Shevchenko (Ukrainian: Пам'ятний хрест до 50-річчя смерті Тараса Шевченка) is a memorial to the prominent poet Taras Shevchenko. It is located in the village of Burdiakivtsi, Skala-Podilska settlement hromada, Chortkiv Raion, Ternopil Oblast.

It has been declared a monument of monumental art of local importance.

== Description ==
The 3-meter-high stone memorial cross was erected in 1911. It is one of the first monuments to Taras Shevchenko in Galicia, designed by architect Oleksandr Lushpynskyi from Butsniv, Ternopil Raion.

A monument in the form of a cross on a rectangular pedestal was made of stone by local craftsmen and installed near the school. At the top of the monument is a bas-relief of Kobzar, and on the sides of the pedestal are quotes from the poems of Taras Shevchenko and Sydir Vorobkevych.
