= Immaculate Conception Church, Butsniv =

Church in Butsniv, Ukraine

Immaculate Conception Church
- Церква Непорочного Зачаття Пречистої Діви Марії
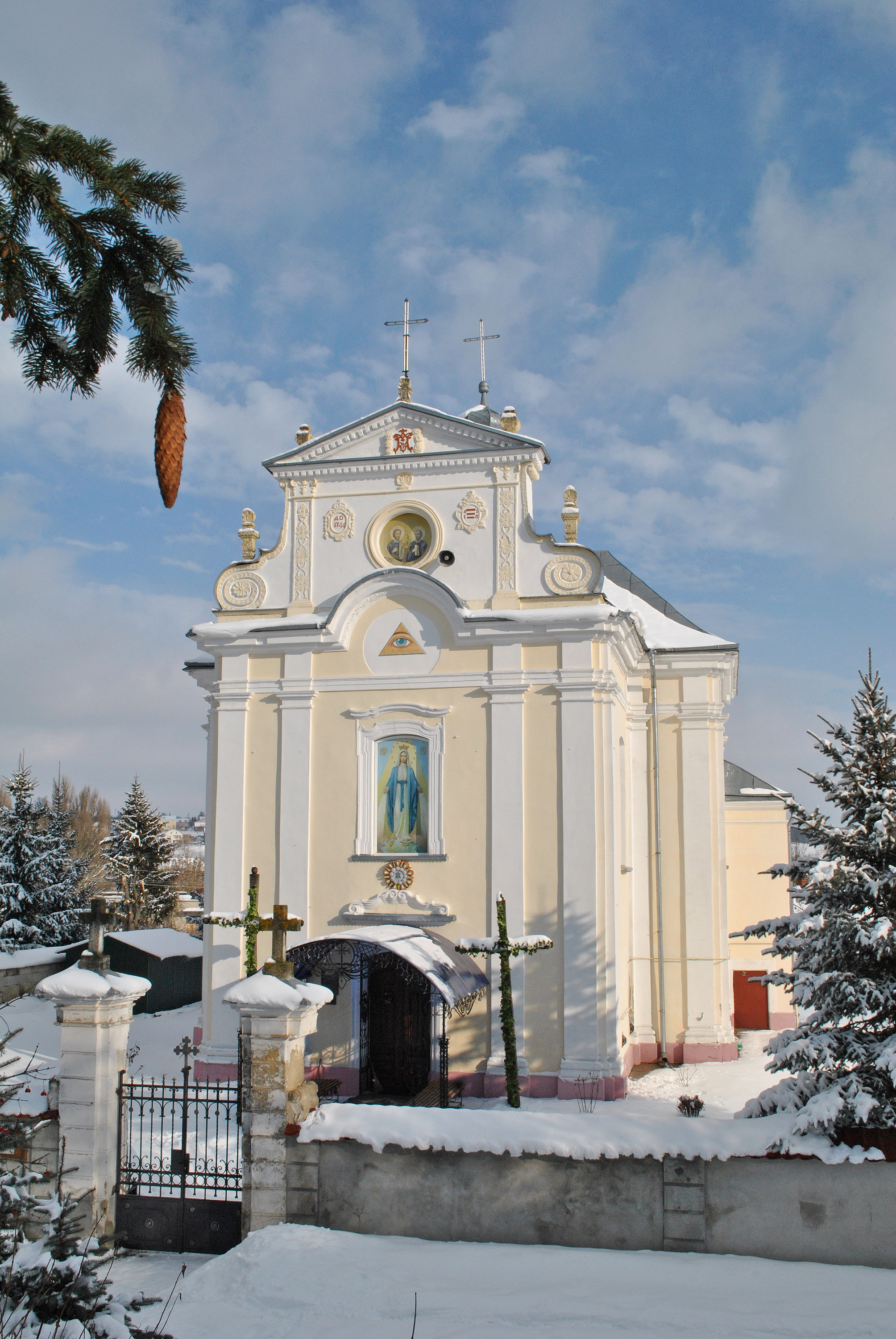

- Location within Ternopil Oblast

Location
- Location: Butsniv
- Coordinates: 49°28′34″N 25°34′26″E

Immovable Monument of National Significance of Ukraine
- Official name: Петропавлівська церква та дзвіниця (Sts Peter and Paul Church and bell tower)
- Type: Architecture
- Reference no.: 190050

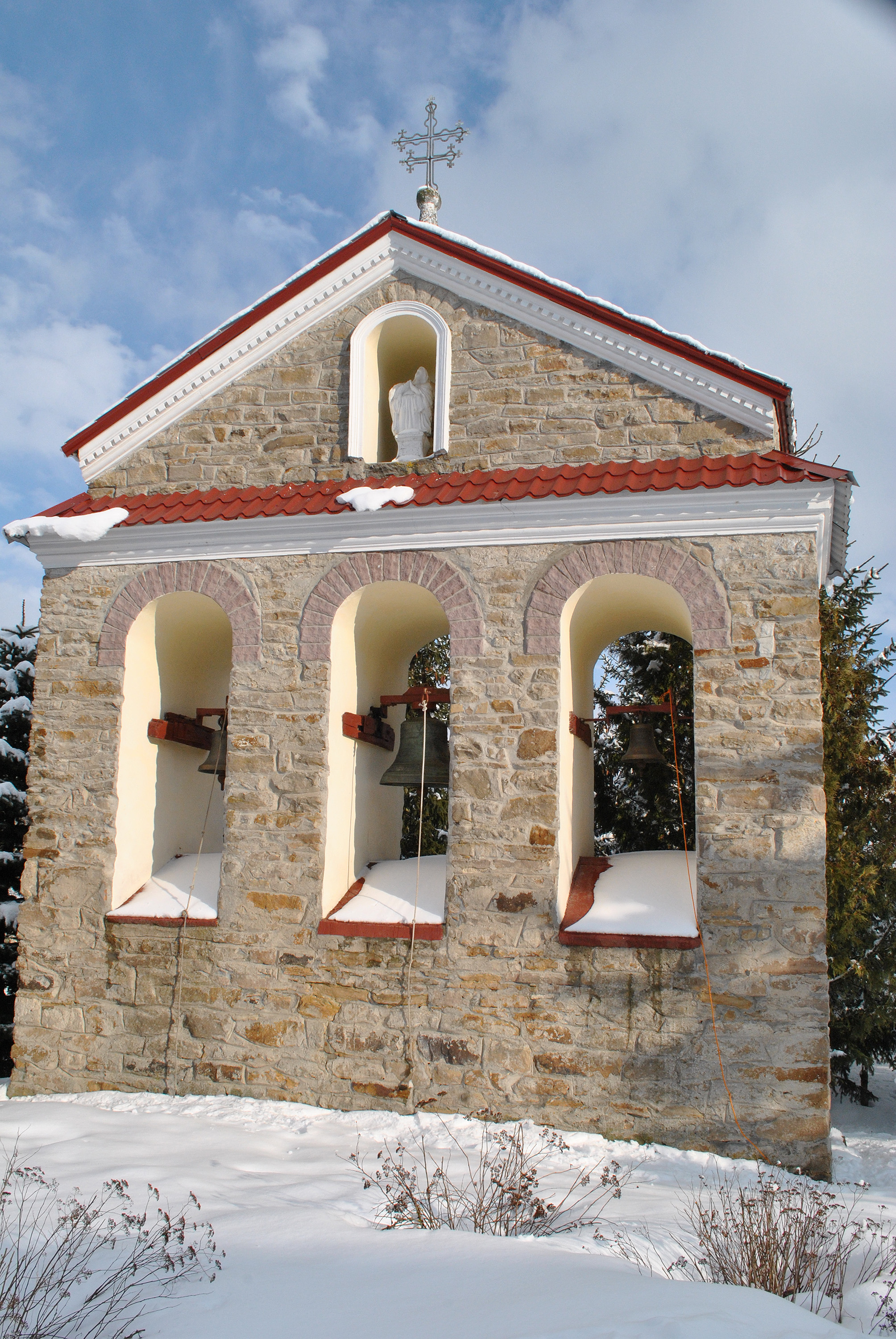
Bell tower

Immaculate Conception Church or Saints Peter and Paul Church (Ukrainian: Церква Непорочного Зачаття Пречистої Діви Марії, Церква Святого Петра і Павла) is a parish and church of the Velyka Berezovytsia Deanery of the Ternopil-Zboriv Archeparchy of the Ukrainian Greek Catholic Church in Butsniv, Ternopil Raion, Ternopil Oblast. It is an architectural monument of national significance.

== History ==
The brick church was built as a church for the Basilian monastery in 1744. Funds for the construction were provided by Andrzej Szumlański, the starost of Butsniv, in 1744 (or 1751). After the Basilian monks moved from Butsniv to the Krekhiv Monastery, they transferred the monastery church to the local community of the Ukrainian Greek Catholic Church. The church became a parish church.

In his will, magnate Mikołaj Bazyli Potocki bequeathed 7,000 gold coins to the Basilian Church in Butsniv.

In the 1880s, the church was painted by the famous Ukrainian artist Kornylo Ustiianovych.

The facade of the building resembles that of the Church of the Gesù in Rome, and in 1992, a commemorative plaque was installed on it with the inscription: "From 1933 to 1944, priest Vasyl Kurylas, a confessor who suffered for ten years for his faith in Christ in Bolshevik prisons, was the parish priest of this church".

On 9 July 2017, the church received a special privilege—from now on, it will be a place of pilgrimage for the next seven years. Bishop Teodor Martynyuk led the Holy Liturgy on the occasion of this event. Three days are designated for a full indulgence: the first Sunday after the Nativity of John the Baptist, the feast of the Holy Apostles Peter and Paul, and the feast of the Immaculate Conception of the Blessed Virgin Mary.

== Bell tower ==
Architectural monument of national importance in Ukraine, protection number 1598/2.

== Theotokos of Butsniv ==
The main icon is the miraculous Theotokos of Butsniv, a copy of the Belz (now Częstochowa) Virgin Mary, which was presented to the community of Butsniv by the mayor Matvii Tsyvinskyi in 1729. On 25 January 1737, Metropolitan Athanasius Szeptycki proclaimed it miraculous in his letter.

== Parish ==
The Greek Catholic parish in Butsniv was established in the first half of the 18th century.

Before World War II, Metropolitan Andrey Sheptytsky visited the parish, and in 2012, Metropolitan Vasyl Semeniuk visited.

The parish has the following groups: Mothers in Prayer, Marian and Altar Servers. Catechesis in the church is conducted by the priest. The parish cooperates with the school and local authorities.

The parish owns a residential building for clergy. Volodymyr Hladkyi is the head of the parish council.

Currently, out of approximately 1,200 people living in the village, 780 belong to the parish.

== Priests ==
- Izydor Hlynskyi (12 December 1887 – 1931)
- Mykola Kulynych (1932)
- Vasyl Kurylas (1933–1944)
- Petro-Oles Gereta (1944–1946)
- Mykola Nikolaiev (from 1990)
- Vasylii Semeniuk
- Volodymyr Dutka
- Roman Hrydzhuk
- Vasyl Didukh
- Yaroslav Pivtorak (from 1996)
- Vasyl Didukh (from July 2003)

== See also ==
- Saints Peter and Paul Church, Butsniv

== Bibliography ==
- Новосядлий Б. Буцнів. Екскурс у минуле на хвилях любові: Іст.-краєзн. нарис // Б. Новосядлий. — 2-е вид., перероб. і доп. — Т. : Джура, 2006. — 296 с.
- Парафія с. Буцнів. Церква Непорочного Зачаття Пресвятої Діви Марії // Тернопільсько-Зборівська архиєпархія. Парафії, монастирі, храми. Шематизм / Автор концепції Куневич Б.; керівник проєкту, науковий редактор Стоцький Я. — Тернопіль : ТОВ «Новий колір», 2014. — С. 69. : іл. — ISBN 978-966-2061-29-1.
- Нехай береже Вас Господь! [Текст] : [про настоятеля церкви Непорочного Зачаття Пречистої Діви Маріїї с. Буцнів Терноп. р-ну о. Є. Кобилюка] // Сільський господар плюс Тернопільщина. — 2020. — No. 16 (22 квіт.). — С. 3.
- Czołowski A. Przeszlość і zabytki województwa Tarnapolskiego. — Tarnopol, 1926. — S. 164. (in Polish)
