= Butsniv Castle =

Castle in Butsniv, Ternopil Oblast, Ukraine

- Буцнівський замок
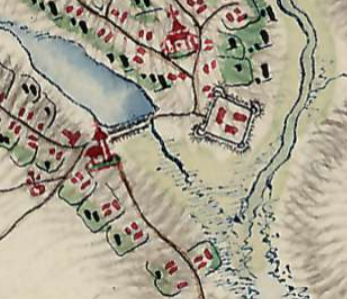
- Butsniv Castle on the map by Friedrich von Mieg, 18th century

General information
- Location: Butsniv, Ternopil Raion, Ternopil Oblast
- Country: Ukraine
- Coordinates: 49°28′42″N 25°33′58″E

Butsniv Castle (Ukrainian: Буцнівський замок) is a defensive castle built in Butsniv, Ternopil Oblast, Ukraine.

== History ==
Butsniv was a royal estate owned in the middle of the 17th century by Gabriel Silnicki of the Jelita coat of arms, castellan of Chernykhiv, later of Kamieniec. An instruction sent from the army from the General Circle near Bratslav, dated 1 November 1671, mentions that due to the merits of the war, the Bishurmese captivity and the costs incurred for the fortification of Butsniv, a commission was appointed to determine the sum and costs incurred for the fortification of the castle in the prince's estate.

By the mid-19th century, three four-sided towers, one story high, had survived from the castle. One of them had a vaulted cellar. Two towers in the early 19th century were joined by a one-story wing, topped with a gable roof. The last owners of the Butsniv palace, the Serwatowskis, were exiled to Kazakhstan in April 1940, and the palace's collections were lost. Today there is no visible trace of the palace or the earlier castle.

== Bibliography ==
- (in Ukrainian) Новосядлий Б., Уніят-Карпович, В., Буцнів // Ternopil region. History of cities and villages: in 3 v. / Ternopil: "Terno-graph", 2014..
- Roman Aftanazy: Dzieje rezydencji na dawnych kresach Rzeczypospolitej. Województwo ruskie, Ziemia Halicka i Lwowska, T. 7, wyd. 2 przejrzane i uzupełnione, Zakład Narodowy im. Ossolińskich, Wrocław, Warszawa, 1995, s. 23–24. ISBN 83-04-03701-7 całość, ISBN 83-04-04229-0.
