= Saints Peter and Paul Church, Butsniv =

Church in Butsniv, Ukraine

Saints Peter and Paul Church
- Церква святих апостолів Петра і Павла
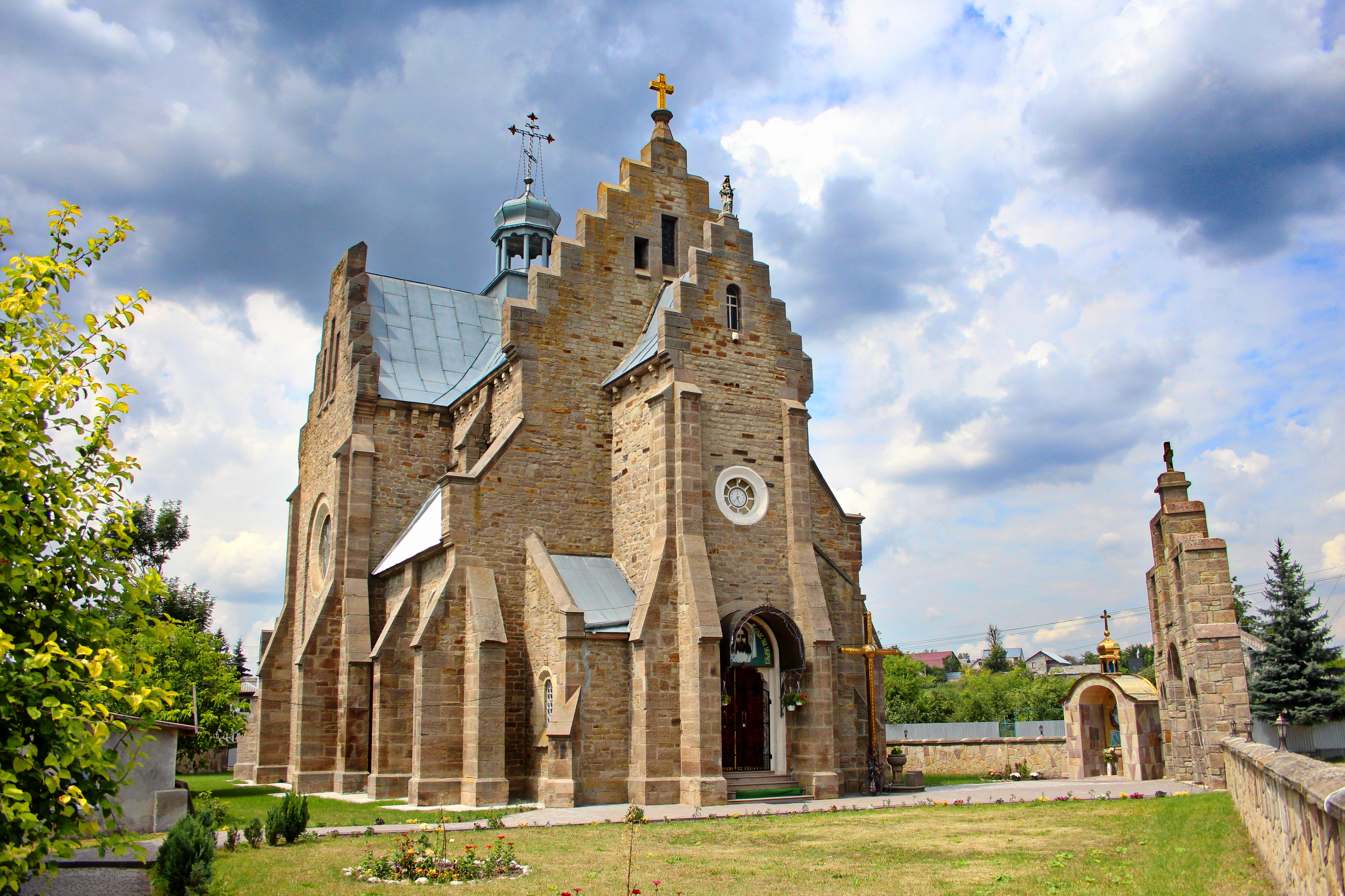

- Location within Ternopil Oblast

Location
- Location: Butsniv
- Interactive map of Saints Peter and Paul Church
- Coordinates: 49°28′45″N 25°34′36″E

Saints Peter and Paul Church (Ukrainian: Церква святих апостолів Петра і Павла) is a parish and church of the Ternopil Deanery of the Ternopil Diocese of the Orthodox Church of Ukraine in Butsniv, Ternopil Raion, Ternopil Oblast. An architectural monument of local importance.

== History ==
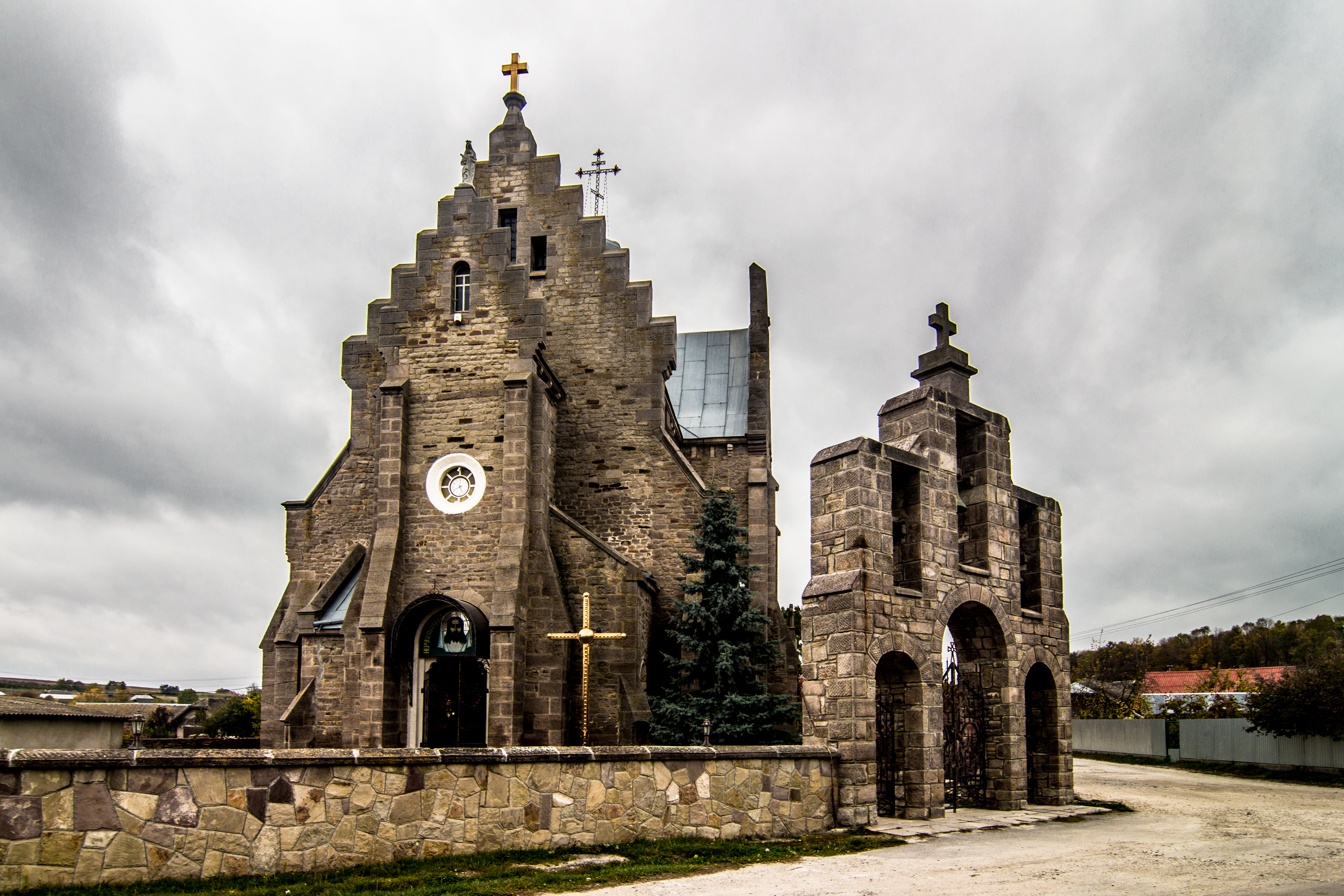
View of the church with bell tower

The temple was built as a church in 1890–1891 according to the design of Lviv architect Julian Zachariewicz. The consecration of the new building took place in 1890 by Bishop Jan Puzyna.

The Serwatowski were the ones who started the construction. To show their contribution, there's a family tomb on the back of the church. There's also a memorial plaque dedicated to Henrika of Kruszewski (Serwatowska), who died at the age of 36 on 20 December 1880.

The historical value of the temple was enhanced by the fact that it housed a reproduction of the icon of the Belz Virgin Mary, which Mykola Polihailo managed to save during World War II.

During World War I, the church suffered partial damage, but was rebuilt and restored in 1922–1923.

The further history of the temple is closely linked to the Soviet period, when the building was removed from religious use. It served first as a grain warehouse and then as a storage facility for mineral fertilizers.

The revival of the temple began in 1993, when the community of the Ukrainian Orthodox Church – Kyiv Patriarchate (now the Orthodox Church of Ukraine) was registered. The building was rebuilt and adapted for Orthodox rites, receiving its current name.

== Architecture ==
The temple demonstrates eclectic architecture, dominated by features of the Neo-Gothic and Neo-Romanesque styles.

It is a three-nave structure on a cross plan, including a transept, a porch, a five-sided presbytery, and two sacristies. An octagonal bell tower rises above the crossing. The walls are structurally reinforced with two-stage buttresses. The facades are crowned with triangular stepped pediments decorated with blind arches, and the entrances are decorated with Neo-Romanesque portals.

== Priests ==
- Mykola Koziar (April 1946 – 1983)
- Volosymyr Shvets (1983)
- Yaroslav Mykhalchuk (1984)
- Mykola Nikolaiev (1984–1990)
- Myron Hakh (1993–2013)
- Oleg Hakh (from October 2013)

== See also ==
- Immaculate Conception Church, Butsniv

== Bibliography ==
- Б. Новосядлий. Буцнів. Екскурс у минуле на хвилях любові: Іст.-краєзн. нарис // Б. Новосядлий. — 2-е вид., перероб. і доп. — Т.: Джура, 2006. — 296 с.
