= Golden Rose Synagogue (Lviv) =

Former synagogue in Lviv, Ukraine

- Hebrew: בית הכנסת טורי זהב)
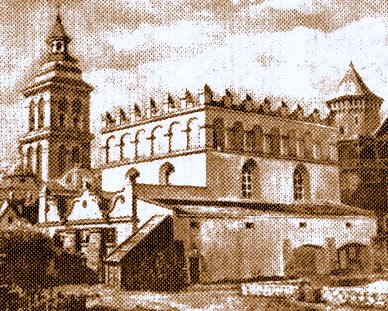
- The former synagogue, in 1901

- Location of the destroyed synagogue in Ukraine

Religion
- Affiliation: Orthodox Judaism (former)
- Ecclesiastical or organizational status: Synagogue (1582–1941)
- Status: Destroyed

Location
- Location: Lviv, Lviv Oblast
- Country: Ukraine
- Interactive map of Golden Rose Synagogue
- Coordinates: 49°50′46″N 24°01′47″E

Architecture
- Architect: Paweł Szczęśliwy
- Type: Synagogue architecture
- Style: Renaissance
- Funded by: Yitzhak ben Nachman (Izak Nachmanowicz)
- Completed: 1582
- Destroyed: August 1941 (desecrated); 1943 (ruins demolished)

The Golden Rose Synagogue (Ukrainian: Золота Роза, romanized: Zolota Roza; Polish: Złota Róża; Yiddish: די גאָלדען רויז, romanized: Di Golden Royz), known also as the Nachmanowicz Synagogue, or the Turei Zahav Synagogue (Hebrew: בית הכנסת טורי זהב) was an Orthodox Jewish synagogue, located in Lviv, in what is now the Lviv Oblast in western Ukraine. The Golden Rose Synagogue, established in 1582 in the Polish–Lithuanian Commonwealth, was the oldest synagogue in what is now Ukraine. From September 1603 until 1801, the Golden Rose served as the main communal synagogue while the Great City Synagogue expanded its facilities. Both the Golden Rose and Great City synagogues were destroyed by Nazis during World War II.

== History ==
A midtown plot of land in the south-eastern corner of the city, right beside the walls, was bought in 1580, and the synagogue was founded and funded in 1581 by Yitzhak ben Nachman (Izak Nachmanowicz), a financier to Stefan Batory, King of Poland. Therefore, the oldest name of the synagogue was the Nachmanowicz Synagogue.

It was built in 1582 by Paulus Italus ("Paolo the Italian") from Tujetsch (Tschamut) village in canton Graubünden, Switzerland, a master builder known by his guild nickname Paweł Szczęśliwy (Paul the Fortunate, in Polish).

In 1595, the same Paolo, assisted by Ambrogio Nutclauss (alias Ambroży Przychylny), by Adam Pokora, and by master Zachariasz (most probably, Zachariasz Sprawny, alias Zaccaria de Lugano) built a vestibule and a women's gallery in the synagogue. Men prayed in a hall that was spanned by a cloister rib vault with pointed lunettes above the windows. An alabaster Torah ark in renaissance style was located at the eastern wall. A bimah was located in the middle of the prayer hall. The building was topped by an attic in Mannerist style.

In 1606 the building was confiscated by the Jesuits. In 1609, after paying a ransom of 20,600 guilders the synagogue was returned to the Jewish community. A local legend (first published in 1863) ascribed the merit of the restitution of the synagogue to Rosa bat Ya'akov, Yitzhak's daughter-in-law. The synagogue was therefore also called the Golden Rose Synagogue after her. Rabbi Yitzhak ben Shemuel HaLevi composed in 1609 Shir Ge'ula (a Song of Deliverance) – which was read each year as a part of the shacharit prayer on Shabbat following Purim. The Song of Deliverance compared the return of the synagogue to the Jewish community to the salvation of the Jews from the Babylonian and Egyptian captivities.

In 1654-67, rabbi David HaLevi Segal, called TaZ after his main work Sefer Turei Zahav, the younger brother of Yitzhak HaLevi and his pupil, prayed in this synagogue. For that reason the building was also named the TaZ Synagogue.

In 1941, the synagogue was desecrated, and in 1943 ruined by the Nazis.

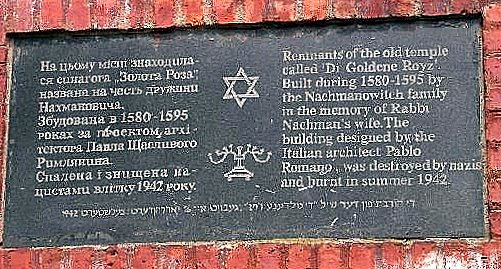
The plaque commemorating the TaZ.

There is a plaque commemorating the Golden Rose Synagogue: "Remnant of the old temple called 'Di Goldene Royz'. Built during 1580-1595 by the Nachmanowicz family in the memory of Nachmanowicz's wife. The building designed by the Italian architect Pablo Romano was destroyed by Nazis and burnt in summer 1942."

The members of the Jewish community of Lviv desire a reconstruction of the synagogue "as it once was". The project by the Office of Historic Environment Preservation of Lviv City Council, commissioned 2016, envisages a commemorative space. "Rebuilding of the Golden Rose Synagogue is not foreseen in the plan."

== Conservation ==
The synagogue was located in the Old Town of Lviv, that was designated as a UNESCO World Heritage Site on 5 December 1998.

In 2010, an initiative of the Lviv City Council, the Center for Urban History of East Central Europe, and the German Society for International Cooperation, The Space of Synagogues project was announced to commemorate the sites of the former Great City Synagogue, the former Golden Rose Synagogue, remnants of the Old Jewish Cemetery, and the site of the Janowska concentration camp. Some asserted that the project will contribute significantly to the conservation of the remains of the Golden Rose Synagogue. Others, however, believed that the Center caters to the local government, which, in view of its support of a plan to build a hotel on the former synagogue site, has thwarted the restoration of the synagogue. After a design competition, the first stage was opened in 2016 featuring landscape designs by Franz Reschke, with additional stages planned.

In an article by Tom Gross published in The Guardian's "comment is free" section on September 2, 2011 under the headline "Goodbye Golden Rose" reported that the authorities in Lviv, contrary to Ukraine's laws designed to preserve historic sites, were allowing a private developer to demolish parts of the adjacent remnants of the synagogue complex in order to build a hotel, which would endanger the mikvah and other Jewish artefacts, as well as possibly the remaining outer walls of the synagogue itself. Lviv officials refuted that information. Reacting to international pressure generated by Gross's article, and by pressure from the Ukrainian president's office in Kyiv, the city authorities ordered a halt to the hotel work in order to preserve the Jewish artefacts and to ensure the synagogue's outer walls would not be threatened. The mayor of Lviv also announced the city would proceed with long-delayed plans to build a Holocaust memorial near the Golden Rose Synagogue in the former Jewish quarter of Lviv's old town.

== Controversy ==
Adjacent to the site of the synagogue, Ukrainian entrepreneurs run a Jewish-themed restaurant, Under the Golden Rose, which opened in 2008. The restaurant claims to honour the city's Jewish past. Diners are, for example, offered black hats with artificial sidelocks attached (suggestive of the traditional look of a religious Eastern European Jew); and, concerning the absence of prices from the menu, servers explain that it is Jewish tradition to bargain over the prices. Some local historians and members of the city's small Jewish community, as well as Jewish visitors from abroad, find such an approach kitschy and offensive, and argue that it fosters antisemitic stereotypes.

== Gallery ==
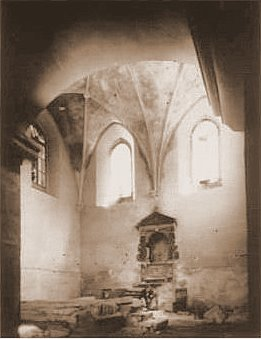
Interior of the synagogue

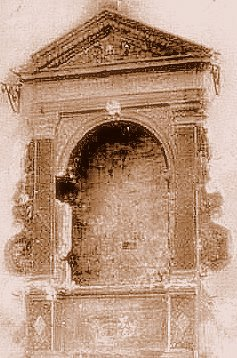
Aron Kodesh

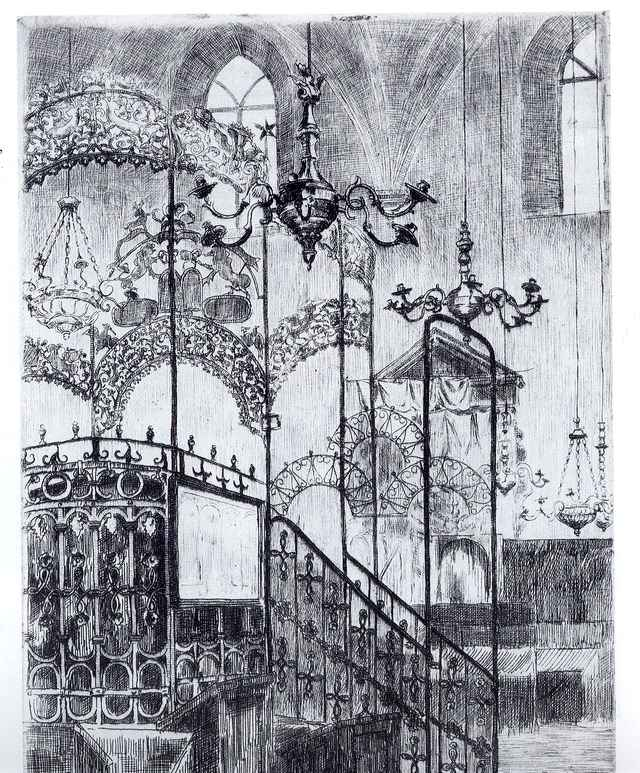
Interior of the synagogue

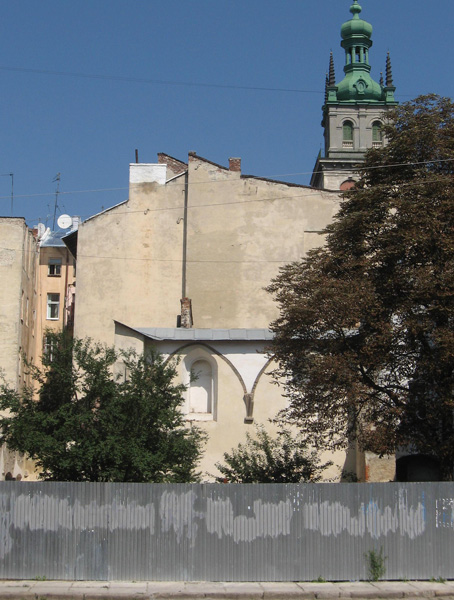
Exterior of the synagogue before restoration, 2007

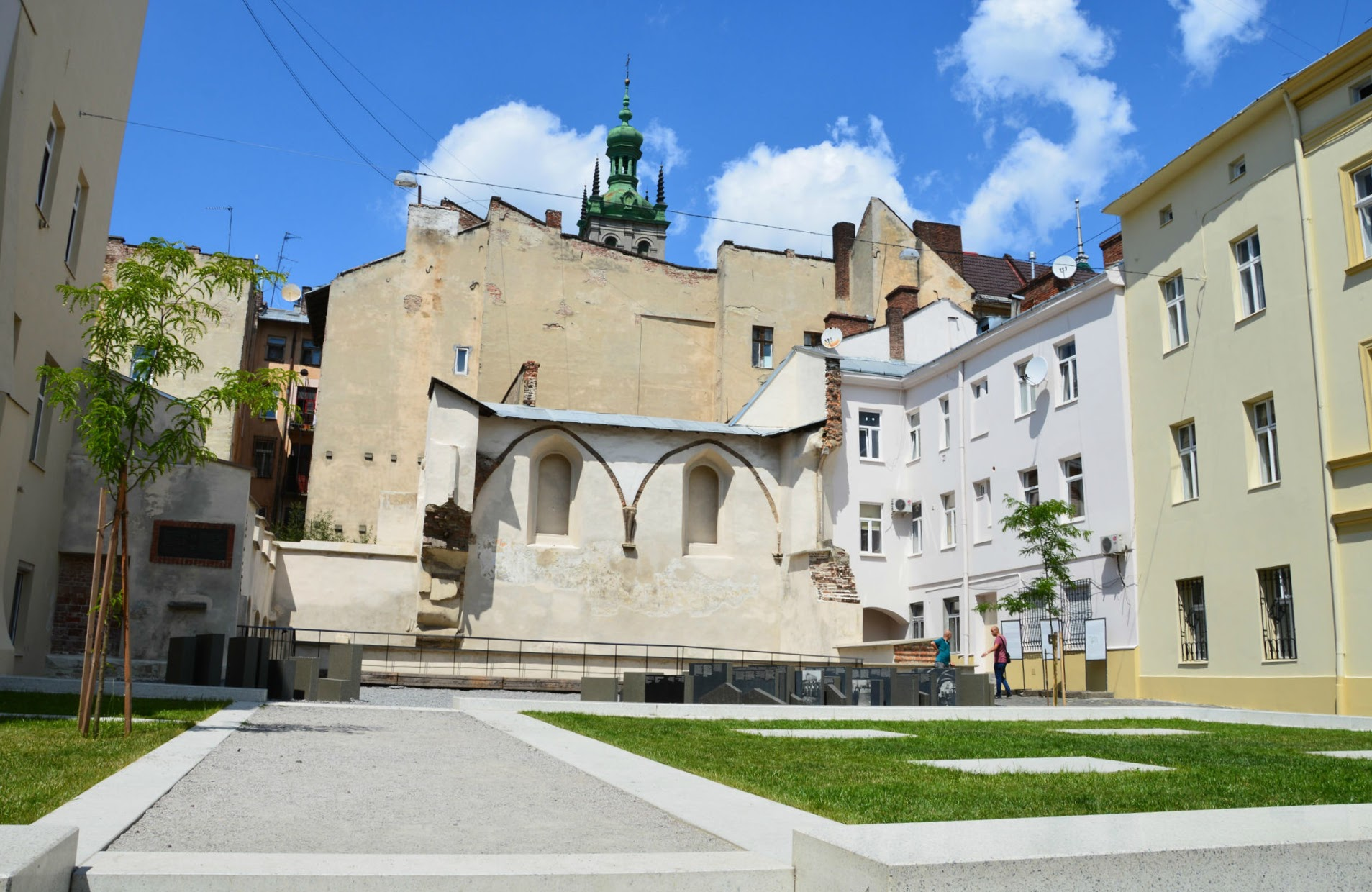
Remains of the synagogue after restoration, 2017

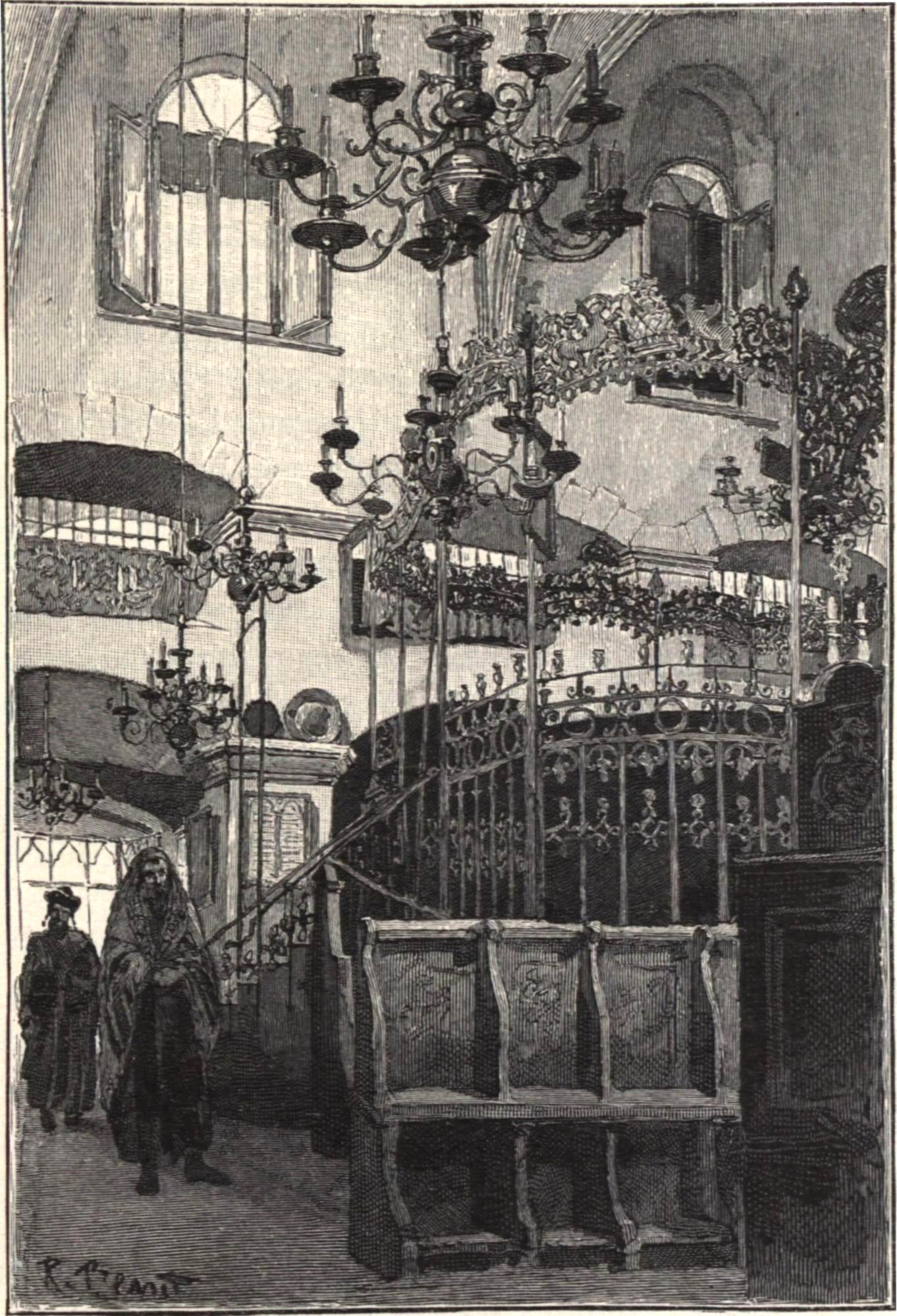
Interior of the synagogue (1898)

== See also ==
- History of the Jews in Ukraine
- List of synagogues in Ukraine
- Oldest synagogues in the world
