= Hutsul Secession =

Architectural style

Hutsul Secession (also called Carpathian style or East Galician style) is an architectural style that developed in Eastern Galicia, particularly in Lviv. The style represents the first attempt to create a national Ukrainian architectural style in the late 19th and early 20th centuries. The style is based on local folk architecture, but incorporates elements of other regional Secession styles. Specifically, the Vienna Secession coupled with the folk architecture of the Hutsul highlanders formed the basis of the Hutsul Secession. Its incorporation of folk designs makes it similar to Ukrainian Art Nouveau in the Dnieper Ukraine region.

The most prominent Hustul Secessioinist was Ivan Levynskyi, who headed a firm of several other architects, including Tadeusz Obmiński, Oleksandr Lushpynskyi, and Lev Levynskyi.

== Description ==
The style is characterized by expressive massing and large, sloping roofs with elaborate contours. Buildings are often topped with towers resembling the bell towers of Hutsul churches. Also drawn from the Hutsul folk architecture is the range of color and décor from the utilization of metals and ceramics in the decorative aspects of buildings. The forms of windows, awnings, and doorways are distinctly elastic, embodying the expressive forms of the movement. Decorative elements and color schemes derived from Hutsul folk architecture were incorporated into building design through the use of metal and ceramic ornamentation.

== Examples ==
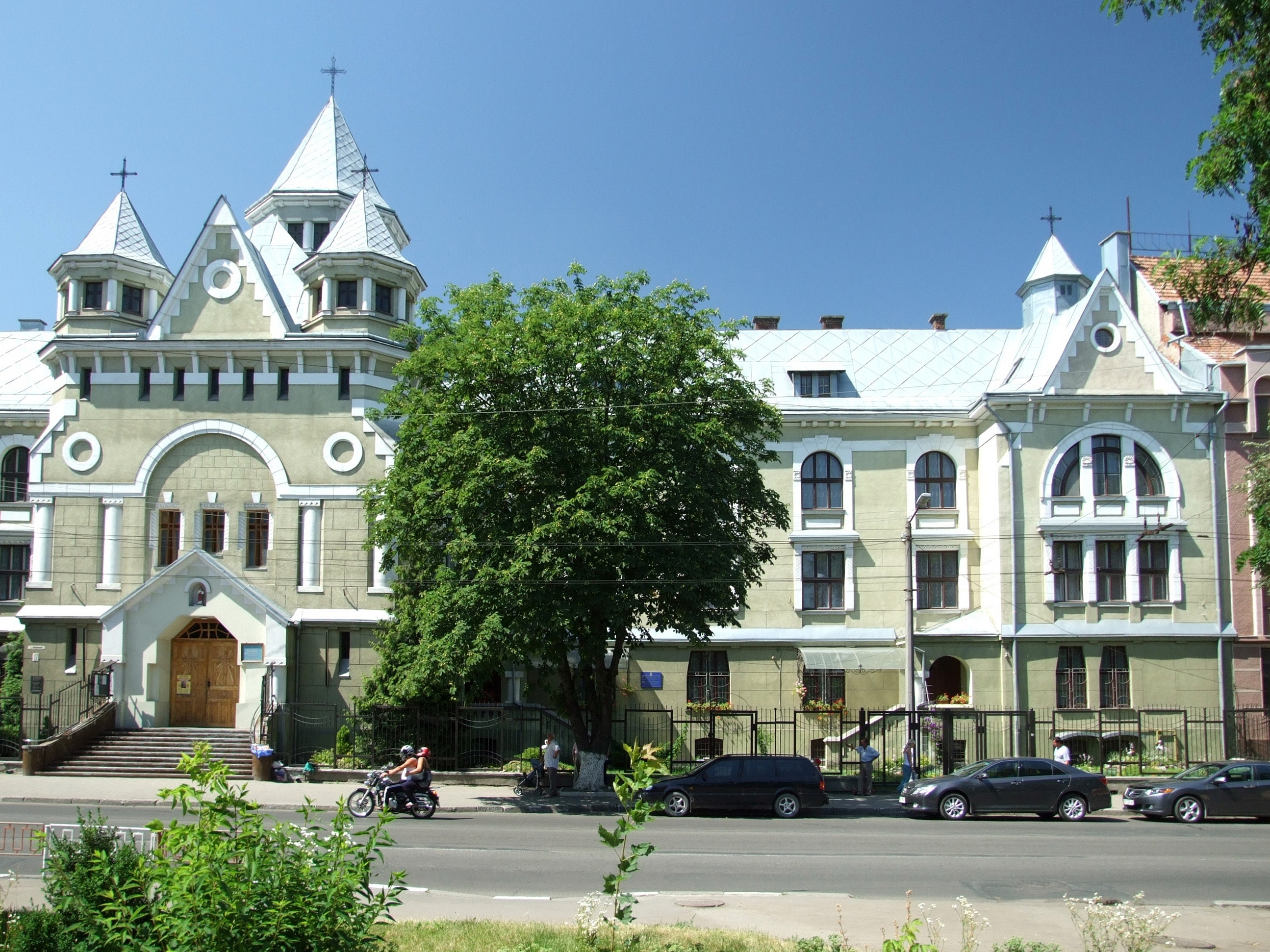
Monastery of the Basilian Sisters in Ivano-Frankivsk (Stanislaviv) designed by Levynskyi and Lushpynskyi

One of the first architects to explore the aesthetics of the “Carpathian” style was the Lviv-based architect Julian Zachariewicz in the 1890s. Later, theories of a new “Eastern Galician” style were articulated by Edgar Kováts in his book The Zakopane Method (1899) and by Kazimierz Mokłowski in a series of articles and in his book Folk Art in Poland.

The ideas of the Hutsul Secession were most fully expressed in the works of the architectural firm headed by Ivan Levynskyi, who is considered the most prominent representative of the style. His firm included architects such as Tadeusz Obmiński, Oleksandr Lushpynskyi, and Lev Levynskyi.

In addition to Lviv, the style was also employed in the urban development of Stanislaviv.

=== First Municipal Polyclinic ===
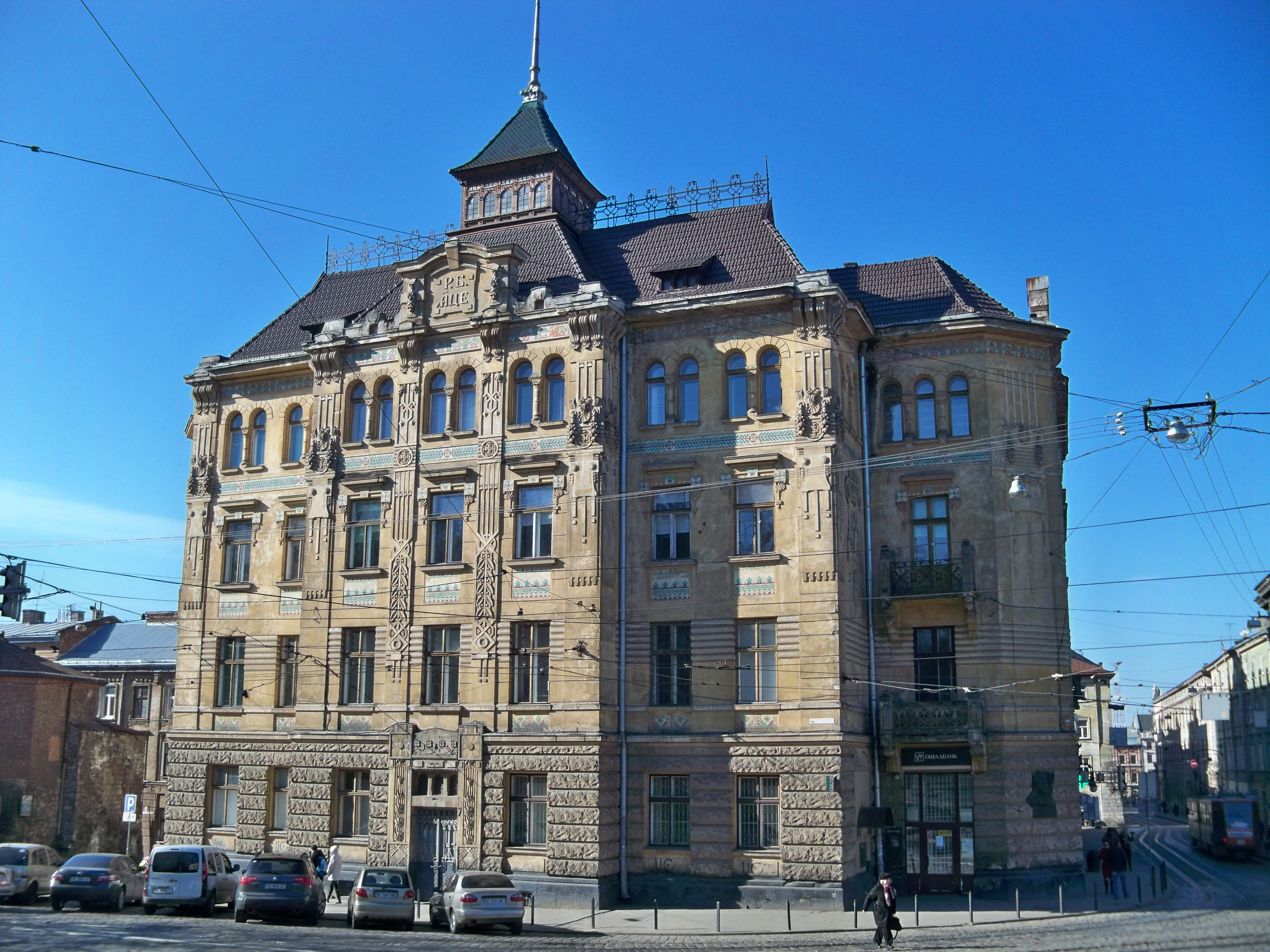
First Municipal Polyclinic

The First Municipal Polyclinic is a four-story building which was constructed in 1906. The building was designed by Ivan Levynskyi and Tadeusz Obmiński and is today designated as an Architectural Monument. Formerly the Dnister Insurance Company Building, it played an important role in the cultural community of Ukraine in the years after its completion. In the 1950s, the building was redesigned, losing almost all its original interior. It was host to a Communist Party regional committee as well as several other community amenities and shops during the Cold War era, and today it is home to the clinic, a gymnasium, a pharmacy, and a binding shop.

=== Bursa of the Deacons of St. George's Cathedral ===
The Bursa of the Deacons of St. George's Cathedral finished construction in 1904 and was designed by Tadeusz Obmiński. Decorations on the façade, especially under the windows and roof, were inspired by Ukrainian embroidery. The colors of the decorative tiles on the building are brown, yellow, green, and white, also reminiscent of the traditional colors of Hutsul folk art.

=== Solecki Clinic ===
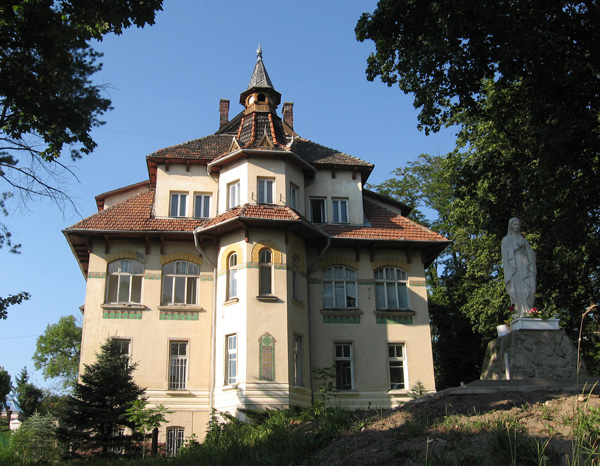
Solecki Clinic

The Solecki Clinic was completed in 1908 and was designed by Oleksandr Lushpynskyi. The building was owned by Kazimierz Solecki, for whom it was named, until WWI, and it was built to be a sanatorium for the Red Cross. While the building was constructed in the Art Nouveau style, it incorporated motifs of the Hutsul Secession.

=== Dormitory of the Academic House ===
The Dormitory of the Academic House was completed in 1906 and was a joint project between several architects of Levynskyi's firm. This building ties together the ornamentation of the Hutsul style with the underlying elements of the Zakopane style. The building serves as an academic center for local students in Lviv.

=== Gymnasium and Bursa of the Ukrainian Pedagogical Society ===
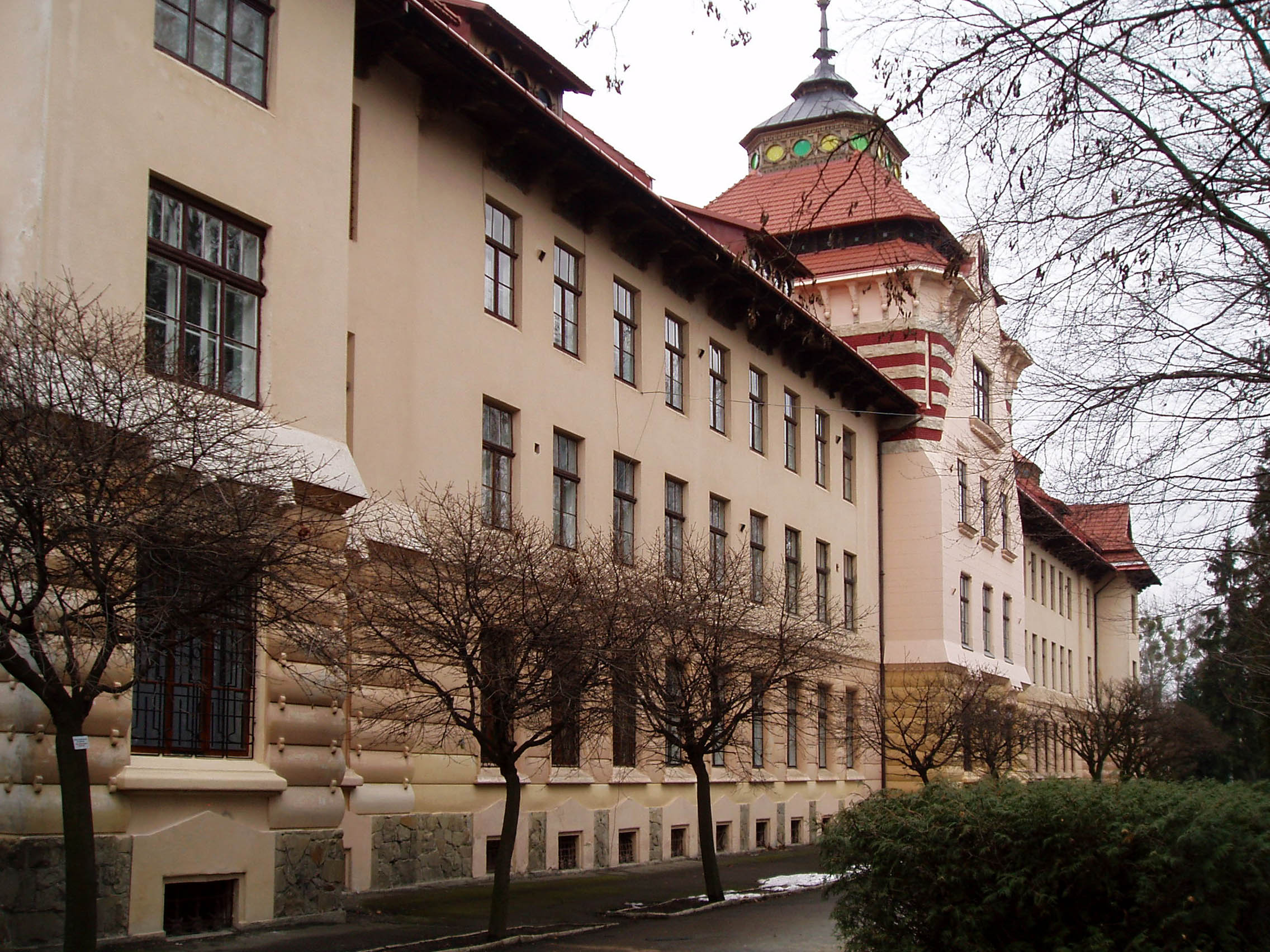
Ukrainian National Forestry University administrative building

Constructed by Ivan Levynskyi and Tadeusz Obmiński in 1906-1909 in late Secession style with elements of folk architecture. Today housing the Ukrainian National Forestry University.

=== Bursa of the National House Institute ===
The Bursa of the National House Institute, completed in 1907, was another joint project undertaken by Levynskyi's firm. Serving as a dormitory for boys of the National House Institute, the building was capable of housing upwards of 200 students.

== See also ==
- Ukrainian Art Nouveau
- Ivan Levynskyi
- Oleksandr Lushpynskyi
