= Center for Urban History of East Central Europe =

Private non-profit organization independent research center

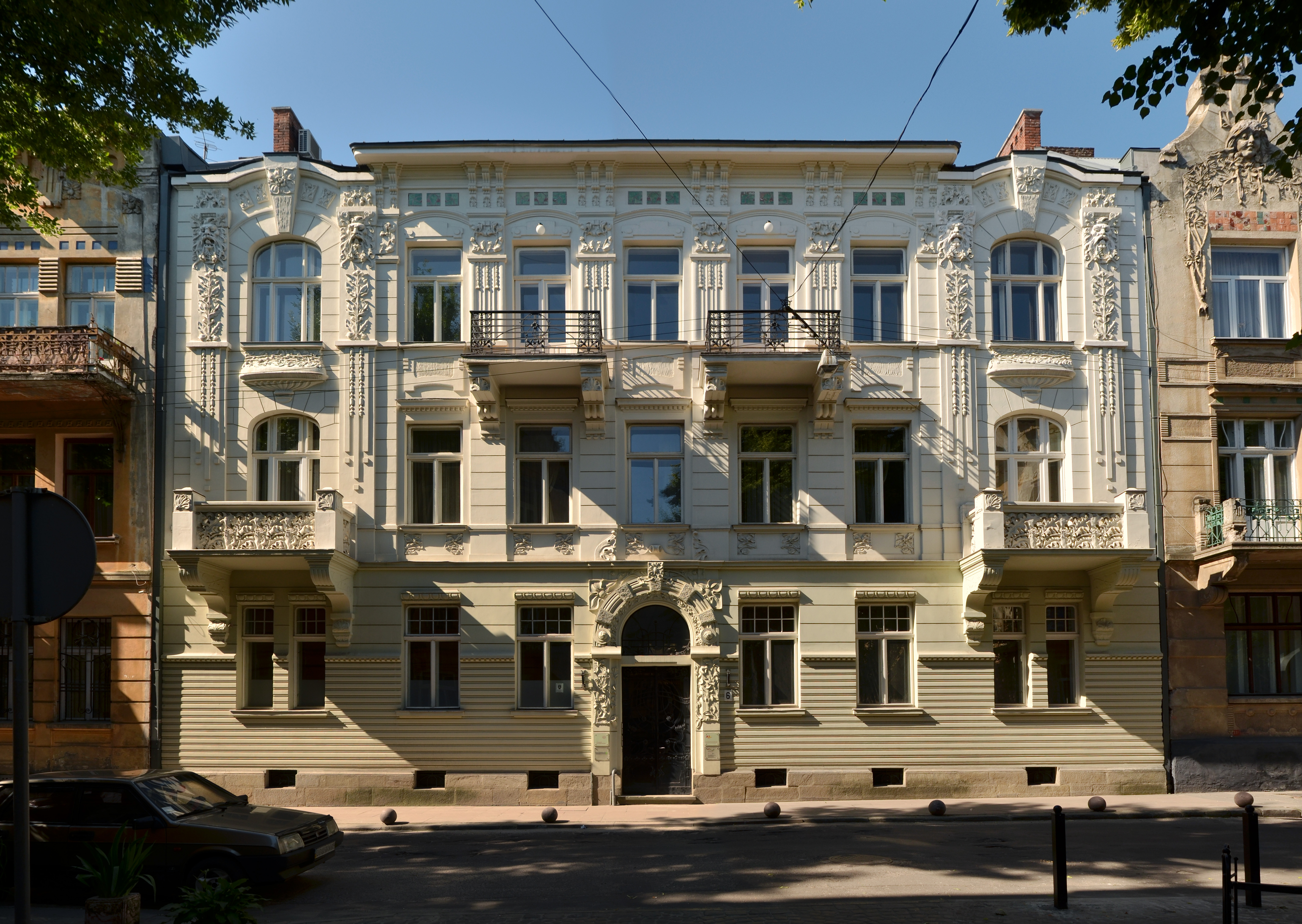
- Front view of Bohomoltsia 6
- Founder: Harald Binder
- Established: 2004
- Address: Vul. Akad. Bohomoltsia 6, Lviv 79005, Ukraine
- Location: Lviv, Lviv Oblast, Ukraine
- Website: www.lvivcenter.org/en/

The Center for Urban History of East Central Europe (Ukrainian: Центр міської історії центрально-східної Європи, Tsentr miskoi istorii tsentralno-skhidnoi Yevropy) is an independent research center, that was founded by the Austrian historian Harald Binder in 2004 as a private non-profit organization. It is one of the principal academic establishments looking at the urban history of East Central Europe, the region between the German-speaking countries and Russia. The academic principal of the center is Sofia Dyak.

== Location ==
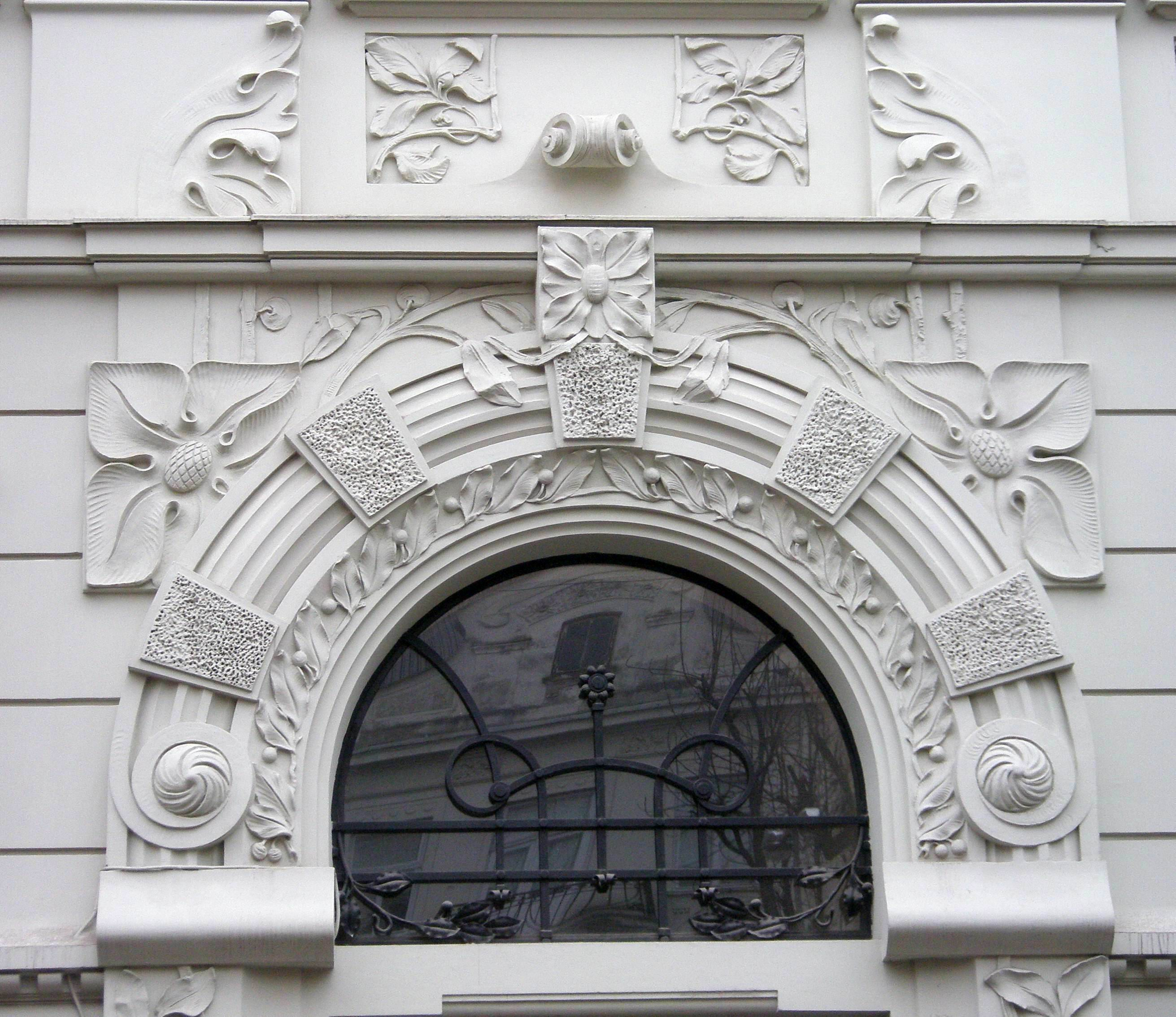
Lunette window above the main entrance.

The Center for Urban History is located on Akademika Bohomoltsia Street off of Ivana Franka Street. The Center is not far from Soborna Square and the Danylo Halytsky Monument and about a ten-minute walk from Rynok Square. The building was developed by the renowned Ukrainian architect Ivan Levynskyi and is considered to be one of Lviv's best preserved clusters of Art Nouveau architecture. Secessionist latticework consisting of leaves and flowers dominates in its facade over its Neo-Renaissance layout which follows Classical order principles.

== The Center ==
The Center promotes the development of extensive research in the field of East Central Europe’s history and cooperates with related scientific institutions in Ukraine and abroad. It offers young Ukrainian researchers opportunities to do advanced, internationally recognized work in their own country, seeking to reduce the “brain-drain” emigration of qualified scholars. Through organization of numerous exhibitions and academic conferences it focuses especially on the cultural heritage of the city of Lviv, and promotes scholarly and cultural exchange. One of the largest projects is “Lviv Interactive” – a platform that is based on a modern map of the city that allows users to explore the city in all its various historical aspects. Some other projects are about the history of different areas of the city (like Sykhiv, Kastelivka, etc.). In order to maintain and develop its various activities in the academic and cultural sphere, the Center has been cooperating with various other institutions, such as the Canadian Institute of Ukrainian Studies (CIUS) in Edmonton, or the Institute for Human Sciences (IWM) in Vienna. It periodically hosts various international and local historical and art exhibitions, often about controversial subjects. Major exhibits are usually connected with the Center’s own academic activities and include innovative content that combines texts, image, films and objects. The Center publishes scientific articles from the urban history of East Central Europe in the series “ece-urban”, which is available online. It also conducts competitions in its January scholarship program, providing scholarships for researchers. The database project “Urban Images” (Ukrainian: «Урбаністичні образи») aims at collecting and processing the urban image of East and Central Europe through engravings, photos and postcards and openly accessible.

== Conferences ==
The Center has hosted a number of conferences:

- In June 2009 the centre co-hosted a conference on "Sex in the Cities: Prostitution, White Slaving, and Sexual Minorities in Europe" which was organised in conjunction with the Centre for Austrian Studies University of Minnesota and the Wirth Institute for Austrian and Central European Studies.
- In November 2010 the "Futurological Congress", an international project with the aim to address the problems of understanding, planning and creating the future as depicted by the Lviv born writer Stanislav Lem, took place in the Center.
- In co-operation with the International Railway History Association the Center hosted "The Great Longing for Railways" in 2011, a conference covering the revolution in transport by the railway system in the 19th century.
- In November 2012 the center hosted international conference "The Ukrainian and Jewish Artistic and Architectural Milieus of Lwów/Lemberg/Lviv: From Ausgleich to the Holocaust", which was co-organized with the Center for Jewish Art, Hebrew University of Jerusalem, amongst others.
- In 2013, the Center conducted a workshop on multi-ethnic Ukraine in conjunction with the summer school "Jewish History and the Multiethnic Past of East Central Europe: Societies, Cultures, and Heritage", with the Ukrainian Jewish Encounter.
- Together with the Pedagogical University of Krakow, the Center launched a series called "“Lviv: City – Society – Culture". The twelfth conference in the series was "Urban Spaces of Lviv/Lwów/Lemberg: Conceptions, Experiences, Practices” of 2014.
- In October 2015 the Center for Urban History hosted the conference "Ludwig von Mises and Modern Societies: Liberalism, Postcommunism and Reforms". It is the third conference dedicated to the world renowned scholar, a well-known Austrian economist and advocate of Laissez-faire liberalism, born in Lviv

== Projects ==
- Space of Synagogues :In July 2015 the Center started work with a range of organisations on the memorialisation of the Synagogues of Lviv, including the conservation of the ruins of the Golden Rose Synagogue.
