= Eugeniusz Czerwiński =

Polish architect

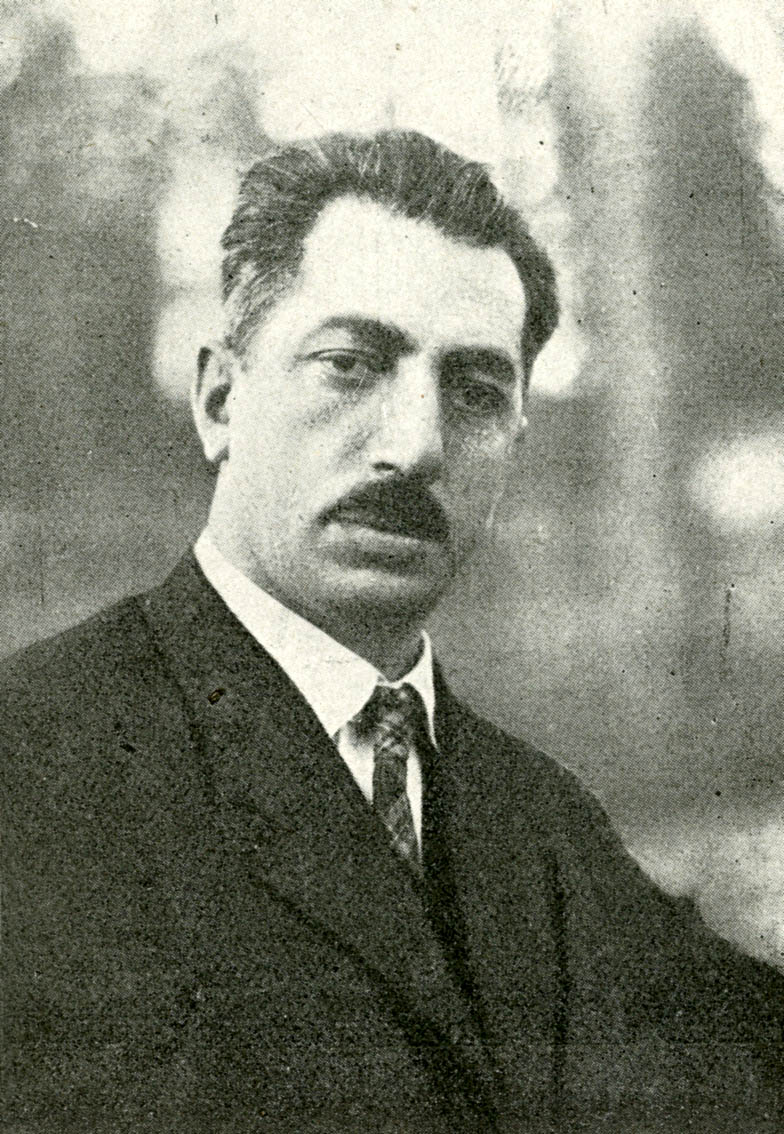
Eugeniusz Czerwiński

Eugeniusz Czerwiński (1887–1930) was a Polish architect.

Czerwiński worked underneath Ivan Levynskyi at his office in Lviv. Between 1914 and 1916, he helped to design the city's Lysenko Music Institute.
