= Butsniv =

Village in Ternopil Oblast, Ukraine

Butsniv Буцнів
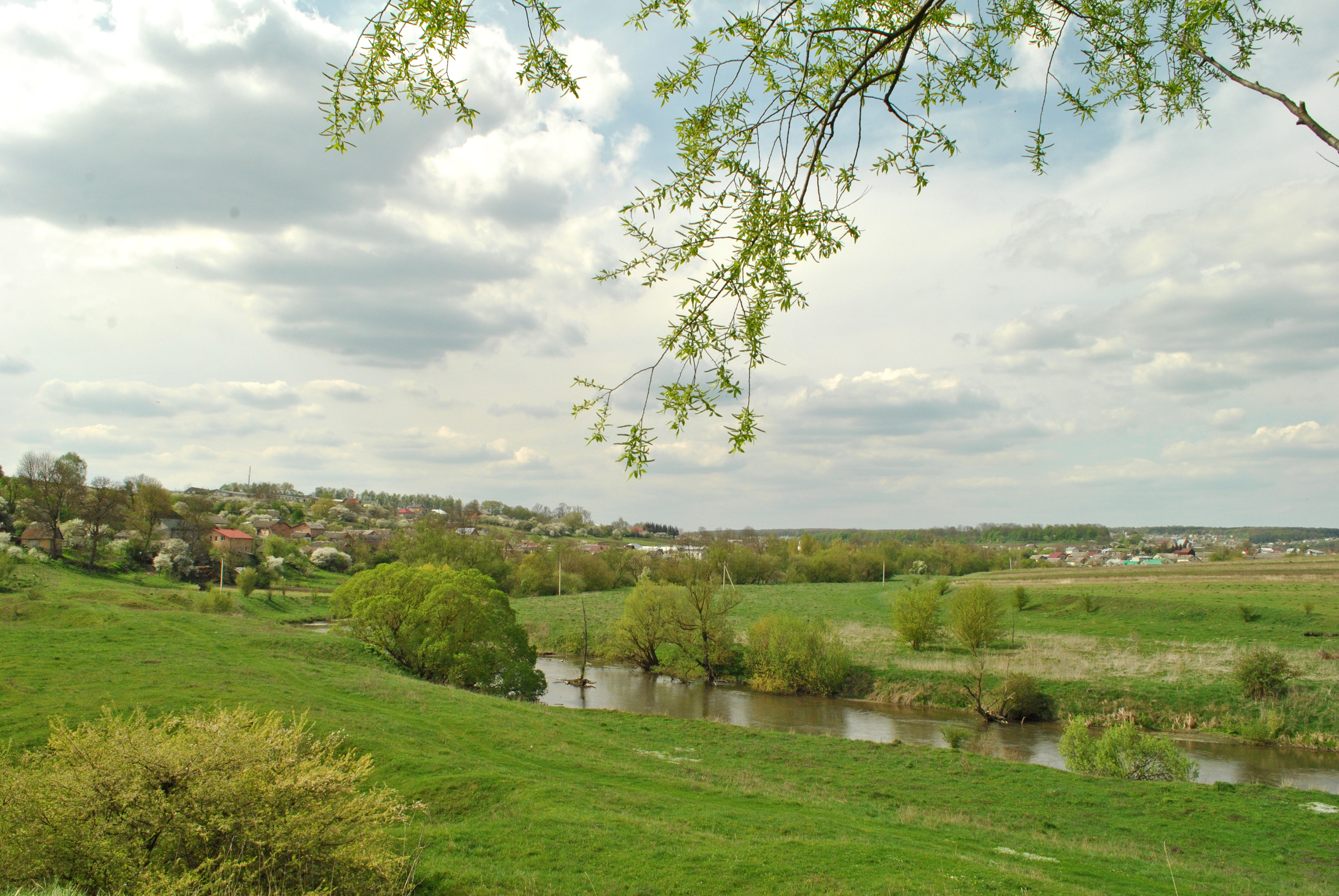
- A view of Butsniv from the southeast

- Location in Ternopil Oblast
- Coordinates: 49°28′42″N 25°33′58″E
- Country: Ukraine
- Oblast: Ternopil Oblast
- Raion: Ternopil Raion
- Hromada: Velyka Berezovytsia Hromada
- Postal code: 47730

Butsniv (Ukrainian: Буцнів) is a village in Velyka Berezovytsia settlement hromada, Ternopil Raion, Ternopil Oblast, Ukraine.

== History ==
The first written mention is from 1464.

== Religion ==
- Immaculate Conception Church (UGCC; 1744, brick, painted by Kornylo Ustiianovych in the 1880s; architectural monument of national importance), the church houses the miraculous Theotokos of Butsniv (18th century, restored in 2005)
- Saints Peter and Paul Church (OCU, former church, 1888, brick, architect Julian Zachariewicz)

== Monuments ==
- Butsniv Castle

== Notable residents ==
- Oleksandr Lushpynskyi (1878–1943), Ukrainian architect, painter
- Bohdan Novosiadlyi (born 1956), Ukrainian journalist, publicist, local historian, editor

The village was visited by writer, teacher, and folklorist Ivanna Blazhkevych, astronomer Ivan Klymyshyn, UGCC Metropolitan Andrey Sheptytsky, and others.

== In literature ==
Bohdan Novosyadlyi published two books: Butsniv – selo nad Seretom (1998) and Butsniv. Ekskurs u mynule na khvyliakh liubovi (2006).

== Sources ==
- "Bucniów". Geographical Dictionary of the Kingdom of Poland (in Polish). 1. Warszawa: Kasa im. Józefa Mianowskiego. 1880. p. 433.
- "Bucniów". Geographical Dictionary of the Kingdom of Poland (in Polish). p. 254.
