= Burdiakivtsi =

Village in Ternopil Oblast, Ukraine

Burdiakivtsi Бурдяківці
- Location in Ternopil Oblast
- Coordinates: 48°53′36″N 26°10′1″E
- Country: Ukraine
- Oblast: Ternopil Oblast
- Raion: Chortkiv Raion
- Hromada: Skala-Podilska Hromada
- Postal code: 48715

Burdiakivtsi (Ukrainian: Бурдяківці) is a village in Skala-Podilska settlement hromada, Chortkiv Raion, Ternopil Oblast, Ukraine.

== History ==
Known since 1458, in 1546 it was mentioned as the village of Bordiakivtsi.

== Religion ==
- Saint Demetrius Church (1823, restored in 1896, stone, UGCC)
- Church of the Nativity of the Blessed Virgin Mary (1871, restored in the 1930s and 1990s, stone, RCC)

== Monuments ==
- memorial sign (cross) to the 50th anniversary of the death of Taras Shevchenko (1911)
- monument to the 150th anniversary of the birth of Taras Shevchenko (1964, sculptor V. Odrekhivskyi)
