= Ivan Levynskyi =

Ukrainian architect and businessman

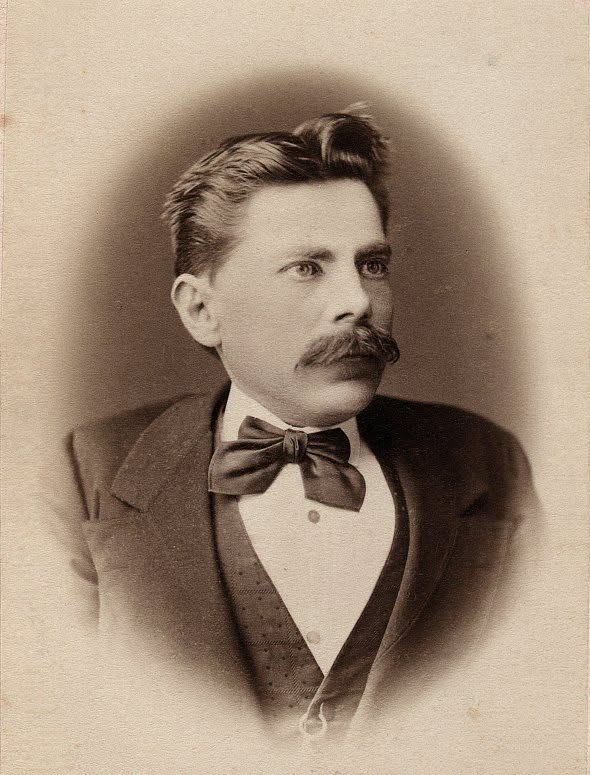
- Born: 6 July 1851; Dolina (Dolyna), Kingdom of Galicia and Lodomeria
- Died: 4 July 1919 (aged 67); Lwów (Lviv), (disputed Poland / Ukraine)
- Occupation: Architect

Ivan Ivanovich Levynskyi (Ukrainian: Іва́н Іва́нович Леви́нський; Polish: Jan Lewiński; German: Johann Lewiński; * July 6, 1851, Dolyna, now Ivano-Frankivsk region - † July 4, 1919, Lviv) was a Ukrainian-German architect, teacher, businessman and public figure.

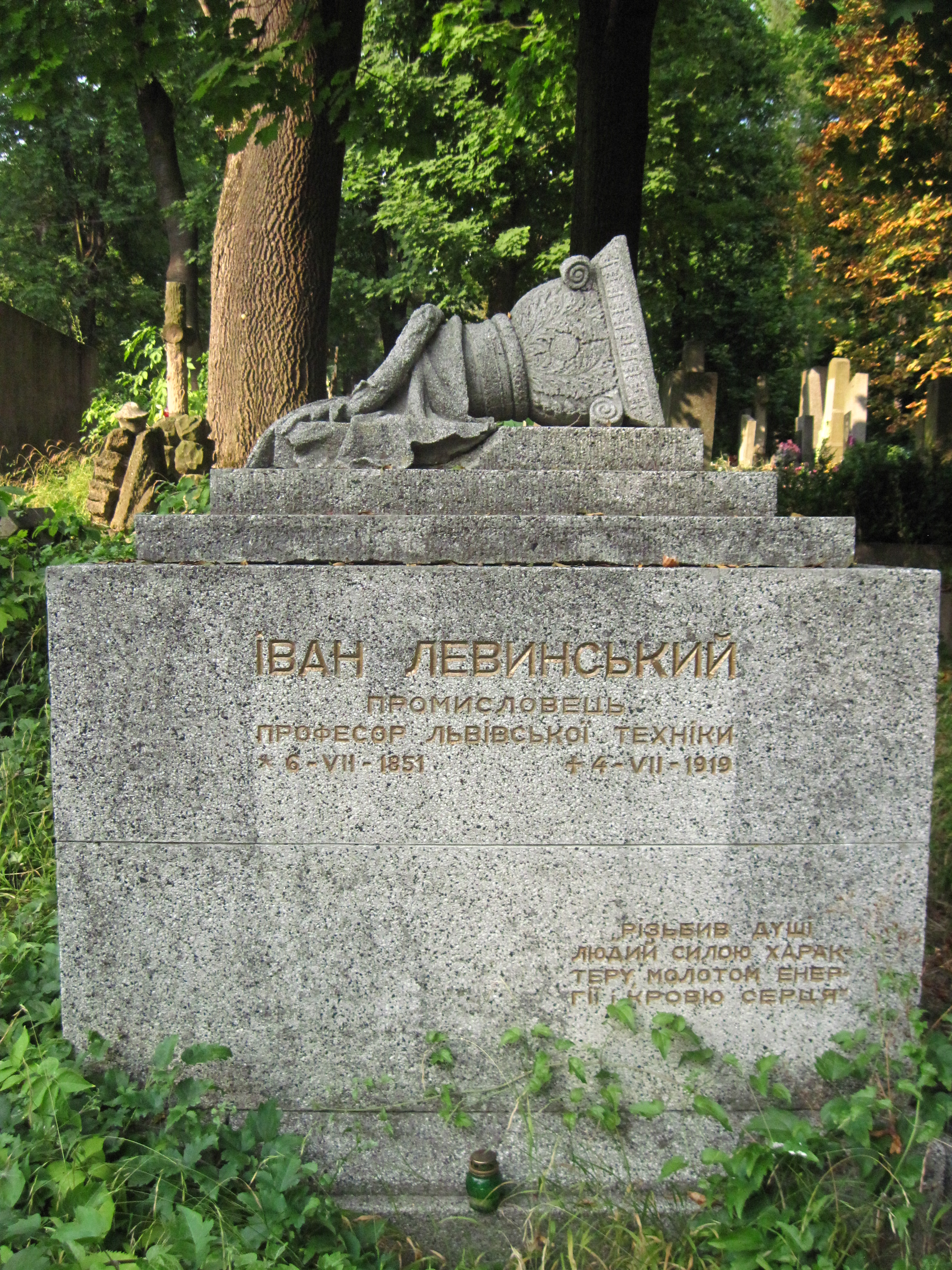
Levinskyi's grave on the Lychakivskiy Cemetery

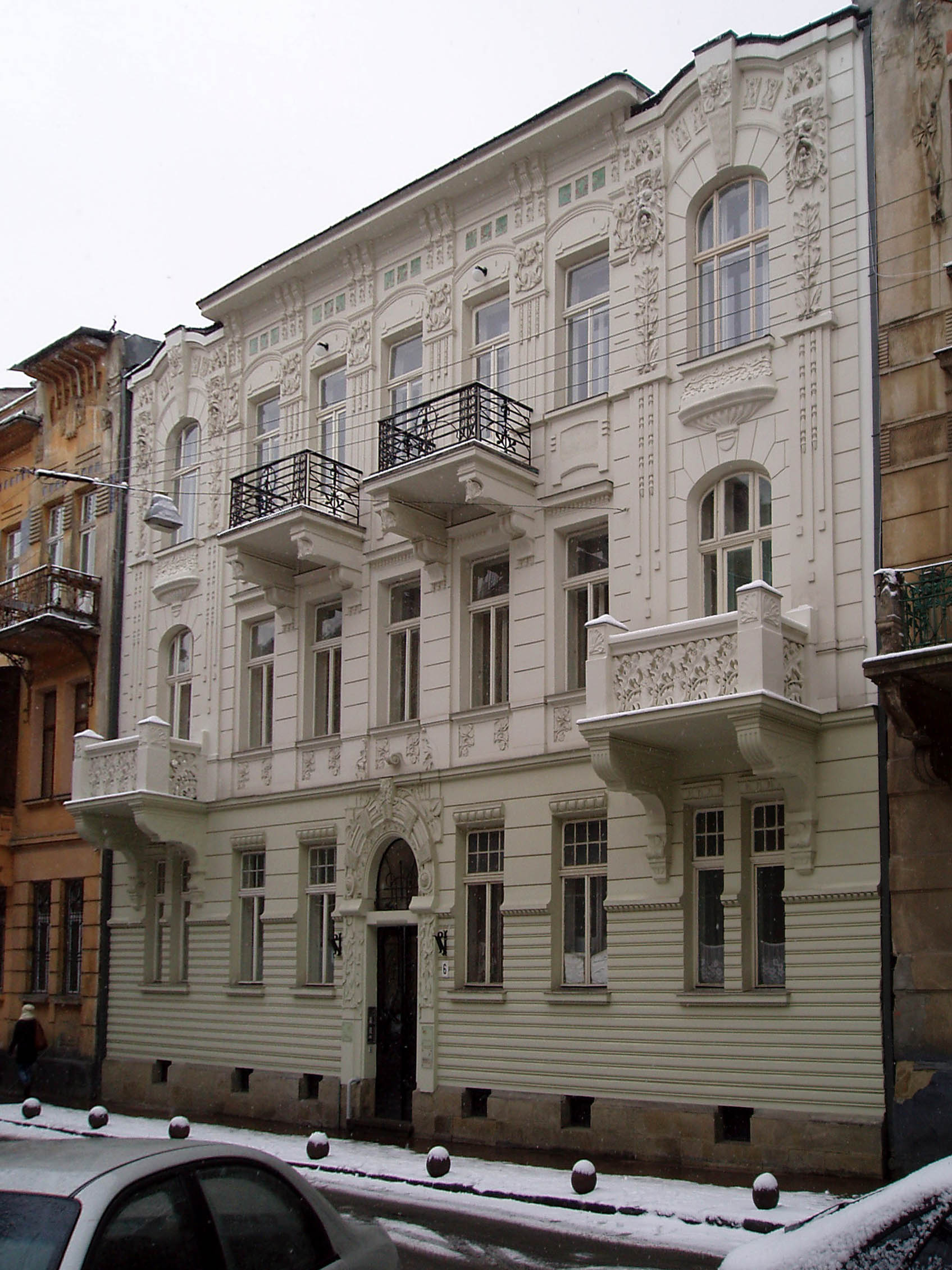
Richly ornamented building by Levynskyi in Akad. Bohomoltsia Str., Lviv. (today housing the Center for Urban History of East Central Europe)

== Biography and work ==
Ivan Levynskyi was born 1851 in Dolina (today in Dolyna, Ivano-Frankivsk Oblast), as the son of a Ukrainian national school director. His father Ivan Levynskyi was from Ukrainian family from Dnieper Ukraine, while his mother Josepha Hauser came from a family of Bavarian colonists. The family moved to Stryj (Stryi) after the death of his father 1859 and later to Lemberg (Lviv) so he could attend the Lemberg Real School, which offered a technical and applied sciences curriculum. In 1874 he graduated with honours from construction faculty of the Lemberg Technical Academy (today Lviv Polytechnic), to which he enrolled back in 1868. His mentor in the academy was professor Julian Zachariewicz. Upon graduation Levynskyi remained with the academy. It was this technical education, combined with his father’s love of folk art, which would lead Levinsky to start his own artistic pottery company. Soon after graduating in 1875, Levinsky partnered with Julian Zachariewicz to buy land in northwest Lviv (Kastelivka).

In 1881 Levynskyi organized architectural and design bureau that was engaged in the development of interiors of houses, drawings of windows, doors, articles of architecture. With time the bureau became one of the best in the city, employing notable regional masters. In 1888, he began building his factory on ulica Andrzeja Potockiego (now vulytsia Tarasa Chuprynky, 58) and by the next year he opened his seminal Ivan Levinsky Tile Stoves Factory. At the beginning, it was a small enterprise – only 2 floors and 5 employees. Levinsky was interested in the development of pottery and bought equipment and a special furnace for making tiles, ceramic dishes, and the like. Soon after he hired professional potters and ceramists and by 1894 his company featured 25 employees making tiles, bricks, vases, sculptures, and other building materials. Clay was imported from nearby Hlynsk (near Zhovkva) and Oleyov (near Zolochiv), as well as premium coal clay from the Czech Republic. Just 20 years later, his company would become one of the most successful enterprises in eastern Galicia (Halychyna), employing over 800 Leopolitans (Lviv residents).

Levynskyi became a professor of architecture at the Lviv Polytechnical Institute in 1903. At the same time he was building his factory into one of Galicia’s premiere businesses, Levinsky continued to work as an architect and constructor. Many of his architectural works can still be seen today, especially in buildings on Chuprynky St. (11, 11a, 60, 103), Kotlyarevskoho St. (25), and Bandery St. (4, 6). His Ivan Levinskogo architectural bureau helped design and build many of the most famous buildings in Galicia – including such eminent masterpieces as Lviv’s main train station, Hotel George, and the Opera & Ballet Theatre. Working together with such esteemed architects as H. Helmer and F. Fellner, they also designed the Galicia Pavilion at the World Exhibition in Paris, the Chamber of Commerce, and many of Lviv’s hotels and banks. It is difficult to move around Lviv without noticing something that Levinsky and his companies had their hands in designing. It’s important to remember that Levinsky was celebrated even in his own time. For example, his company was awarded the Imperial Russian Technical Society’s gold medal at an international exhibition in Odessa in 1911.

At the turn of the century, Levinsky’s enterprises employed nearly 1000 people and until 1914, his company received the exclusive right to supply facing and building bricks for government buildings across the Austro-Hungarian Empire. However, at the end of World War I, the Polish authorities refused to pay for the Levinsky’s Austrian orders and his company collapsed as a result. He died in Lviv of a heart attack soon afterward and is now buried in Lviv’s Lychakivskiy cemetery. Remembered as an architect, businessman, philanthropist, and patriot, Levinsky is today considered to be the Man Who Built Lviv.

His factory changed hands several times over the years, and it was never again as influential as the Ivan Levinsky Tile Stoves Factory. During the factory’s golden years (1910-1912 especially), there were five separate units – each considered to be their own ‘factory’: floor and all tiles; decorative vases and dishes; small ceramic items; stoves; and sculptures. Levinsky engaged local artists, architects, and sculptors to create his original stoves, stove tiles, and tile sets that introduced Ukrainian folk motifs into the Western European tradition. His products were considered to be of exceptional high quality and unique style.

== Architectural style ==
Levinski’s style combined Carpathian folk architecture into Viennese Secession. He designed and built hospitals and sanatoria right across Galicia, including Horodenka, Kolomyia, Ternopil, Vorokhta, Zalishchyky, and Zolochiv. For example, in the Galician capital, he helped design the maternity hospital (originally the Jewish Beth Holim Hospital) on Rapoport Street by incorporating Eastern and Jewish symbols into the Moorish Revival style of architecture. His pièce de résistance, however, remains Lviv’s spectacular Opera & Ballet Theatre, of which his building company provided local materials for the undertaking.

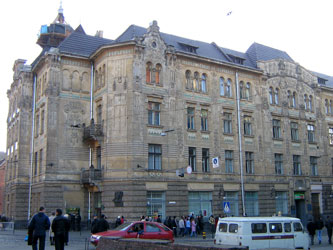
Building of the joint-stock company "Dnister", Lviv

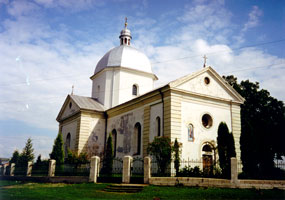
Church in the village of Pidberiztsi

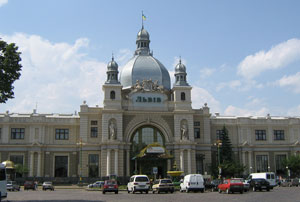
Main railway station in Lviv

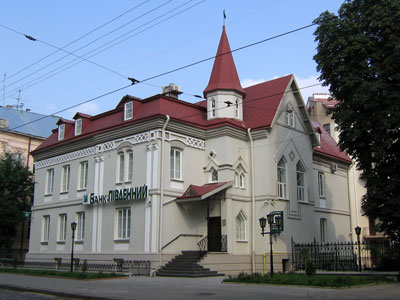
Building of the "Pivdennyi" bank at 11 Chuprynka Street

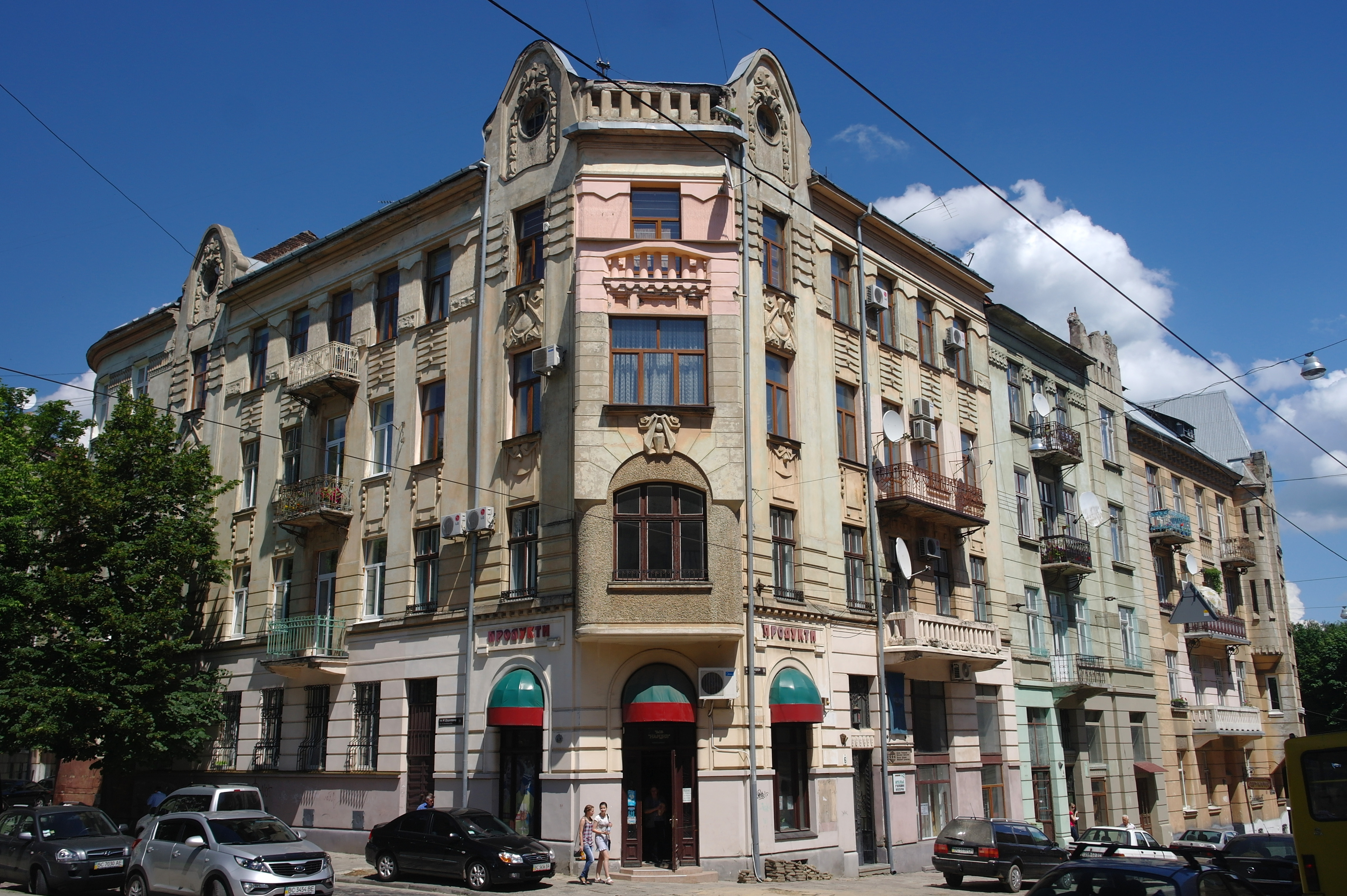
Residential building at 6 Bandera Street

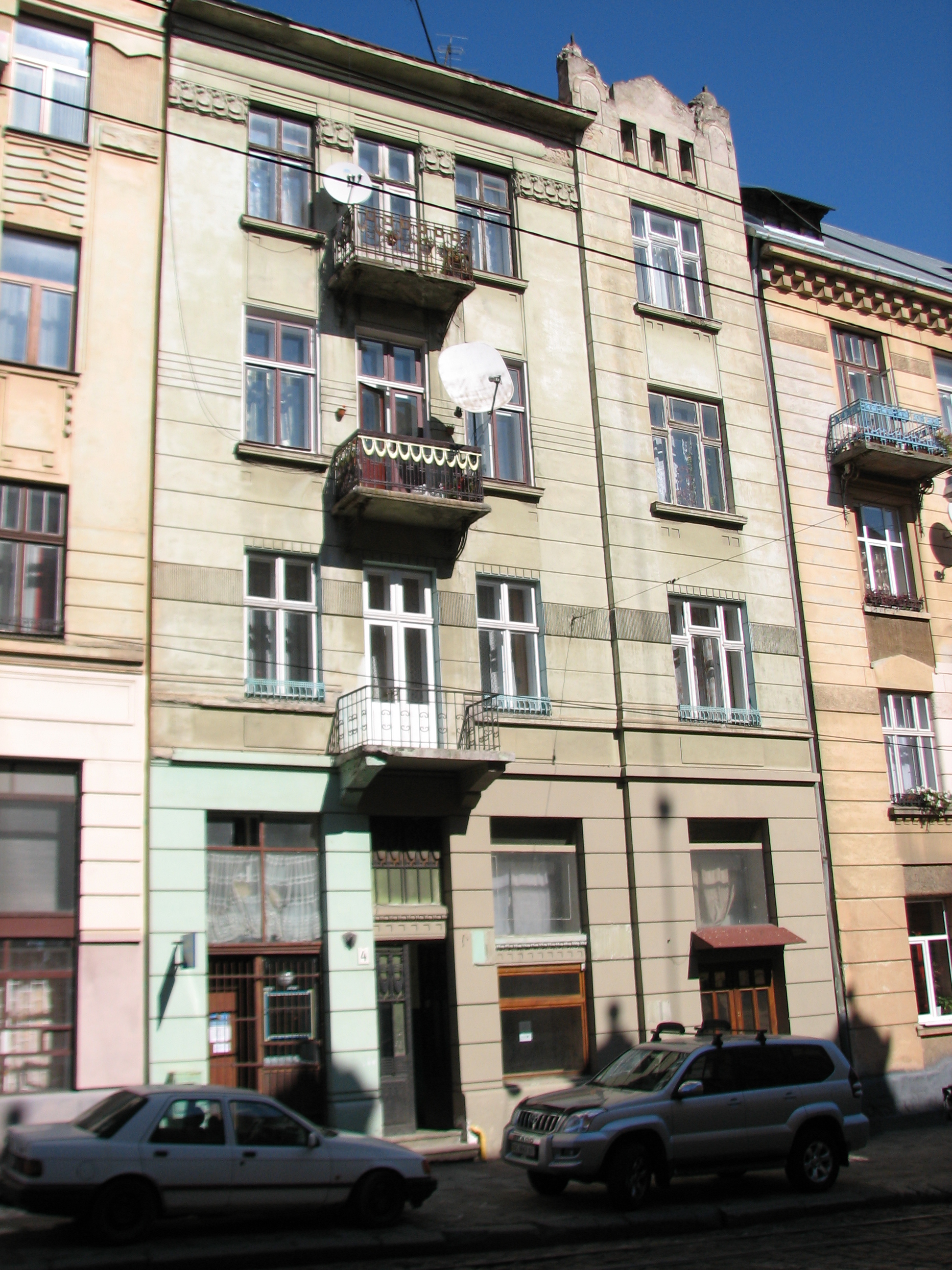
Residential building at 4 Bandera Street

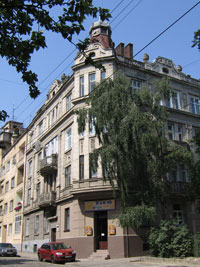
Residential building at 60 Chuprynka Street

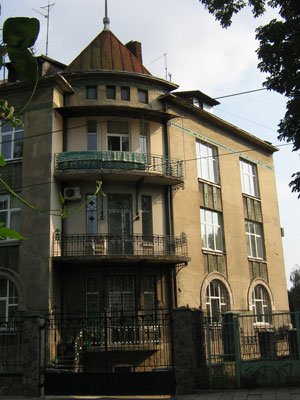
Residential building at 25 Kotliarevskyi Street

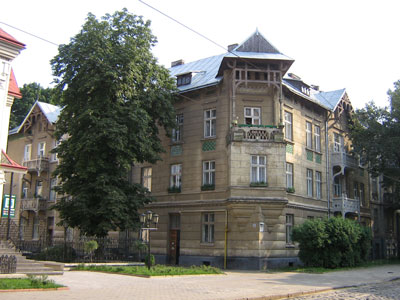
Residential building at 11a Chuprynka Street

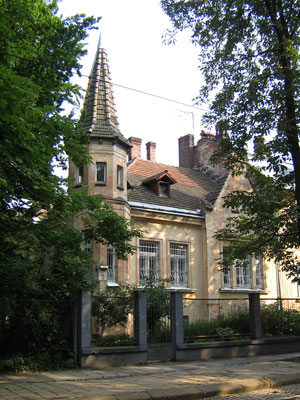
Residential building at 71 Konovalets Street

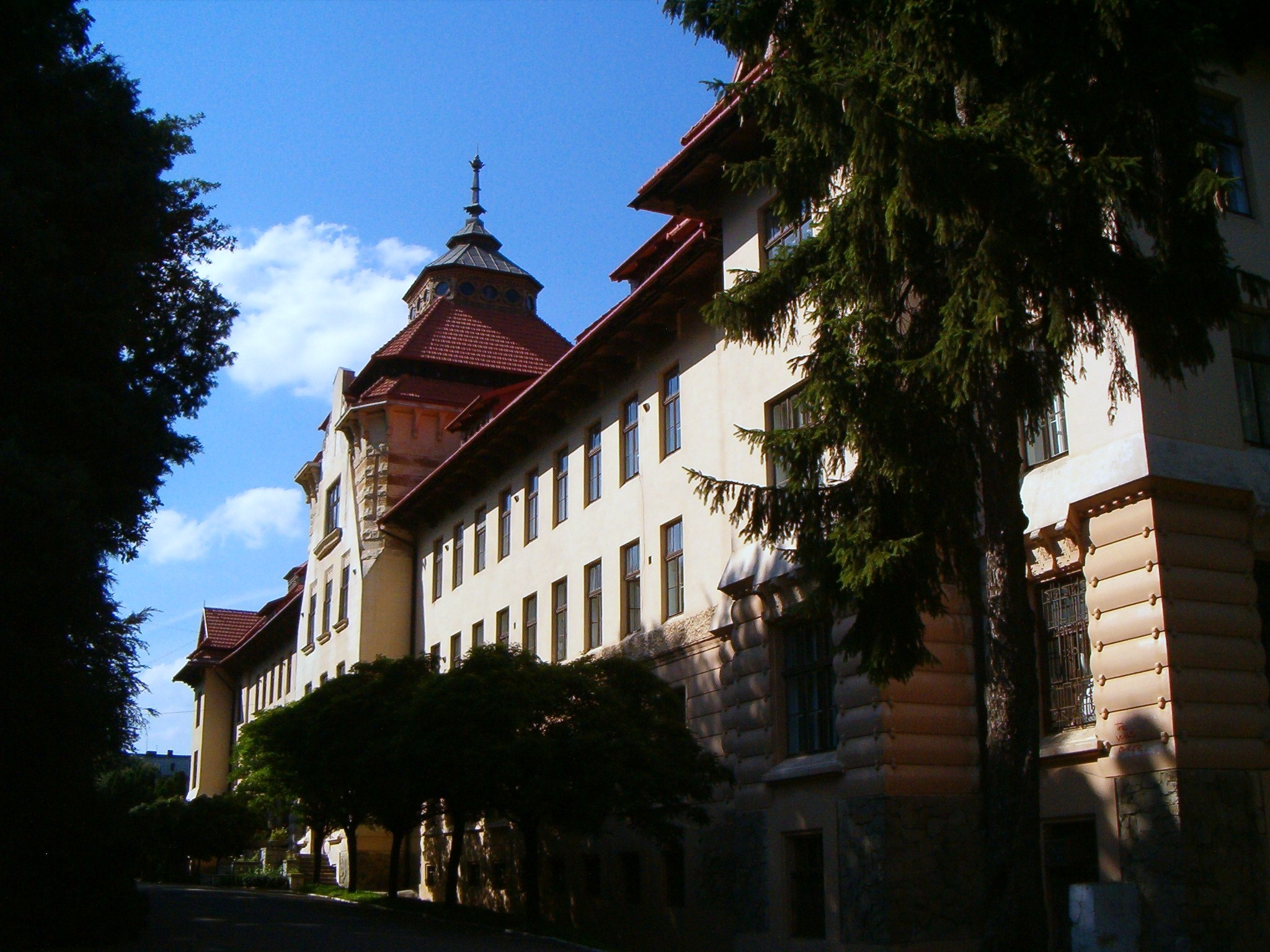
Administrative building of UNFU at 103 Chuprynka Street

== See also ==
- Hutsul Secession
- Ukrainian Art Nouveau

== Literature ==
- Мистецтво України // Біографічний довідник (за редакцією А. В. Кудринецького).— Київ, 1997.— С. 357.
- Volodymyr Sichynskyi Історія українського мистецтва (History of Ukrainian art (edition)) — І том: Архітектура. — Нью-Йорк: НТШ в Америці, 1956.— С. 156
- Енциклопедія Українознавства.— Перевидання в Україні. — Львів: НТШ, 1996 р.— Т. 4.— С.1263
- Noha, O. (1993) Ivan Levynsky: artist, architect, industrialist, educator, public figure
- Noha, O. (1997) Проект пам'ятника Івану Левинському.— Львів: «Українські технології», 1997 р.— 327 с
- Noha, O. (2005) Іван Левинський: Архітектор, підприємець, меценат / Наук. і літ. редактор, автор концепції ілюстрат. матеріалу Ю. Бірюльов.— Львів: Центр Європи, 2009. — 192 с. ISBN 978-966-7022-81-5
- Yuri Biryulev Мистецтво львівської сецесії. — Львів: Центр Європи, 2005. — 184
- Жук І. Львів Левинського: Місто і будівничий: Альбом. — К.: Грані-Т, 2010. — 184 с. ISBN 978-966-465-322-7
- Petrovska, Y. and Oleshko, O. (2019) "The Influence of Ivan Levynskyi on the Formation and Development of the Lviv Architectural School at the end of the 19th and the Beginning of the 20th Centuries", Series of Architecture, 1(2):1-7, doi:10.23939/sa2019.02.001.
