= Bohdan Novosiadlyi =

Ukrainian journalist (born 1956)

- Богдан Теодорович Новосядлий
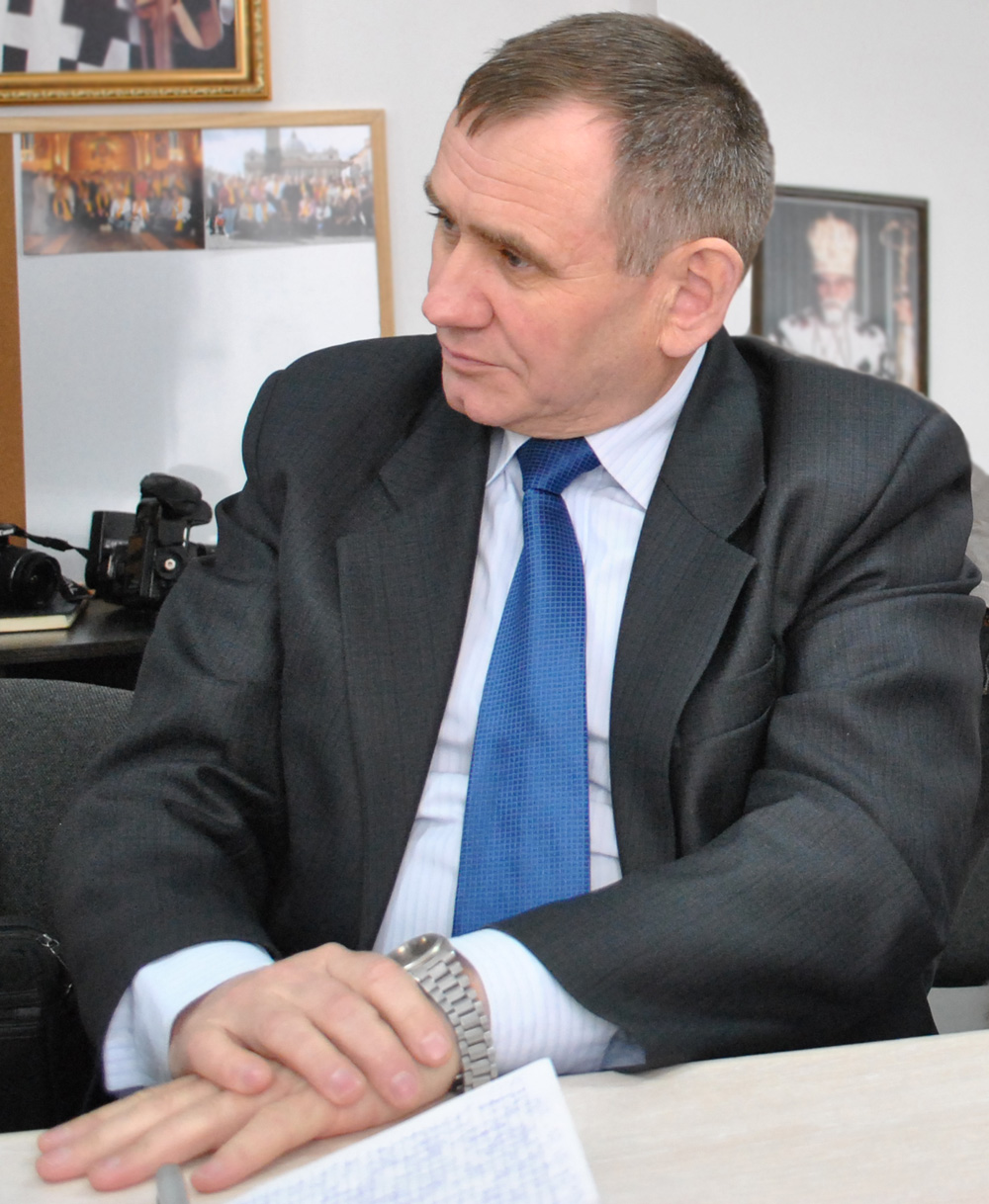
- Born: 12 May 1956 (age 70); Butsniv, now Velyka Berezovytsia settlement hromada, Ternopil Raion, Ternopil Oblast, Ukraine
- Education: Lviv University
- Awards: Honored Journalist of Ukraine

Bohdan Teodorovych Novosiadlyi (Ukrainian: Богдан Теодорович Новосядлий, pseudo: Taras Bohdaniuk; born 12 May 1956, Butsniv, Ternopil Oblast) is a Ukrainian journalist, publicist, local historian, and editor. He has been a member of the National Union of Journalists of Ukraine since 1982 and the Shevchenko Scientific Society since 2005. In 2014, he was awarded as an Honored Journalist of Ukraine.

== Biography ==
Novosiadlyi graduated from the Faculty of journalism at Lviv University in 1982. From 1980 to 1990, he was a correspondent for the Ternopil regional newspaper Podilske Slovo, and editor of the newspapers and magazines Promin, Studencheskyi Visnyk, Pedahohichnyi Visnyk, and Vatra—advertising and business information. During that period, he was also the literary editor of the newspaper Bozhyi siiach of the Ternopil-Zboriv Archeparchy.

In 1996 he was made the head of the department of the newspaper Svoboda. In 2005, he became an editor of the newspaper, and in 2008 was made the deputy editor of Svoboda.

Since 1999 he has been the editor-in-chief of the newspaper Nova oselia (all-Ternopil). He has also been the editor-in-chief of the newspaper Silskyi hospodar plius since 2017.

== Publications ==
Novosiadlyi is the author of numerous publications in Ukrainian and foreign periodicals, as well as the editor of a number of scientific, historical and literary works. In addition to his work as a journalist, he has authored two local history essays: Butsniv – selo nad Seretom (1998) and Butsniv. Ekskurs u mynule na khvyliakh liubovi (2006).
