= Ukrainian Art Nouveau =

Architectural style in Ukraine

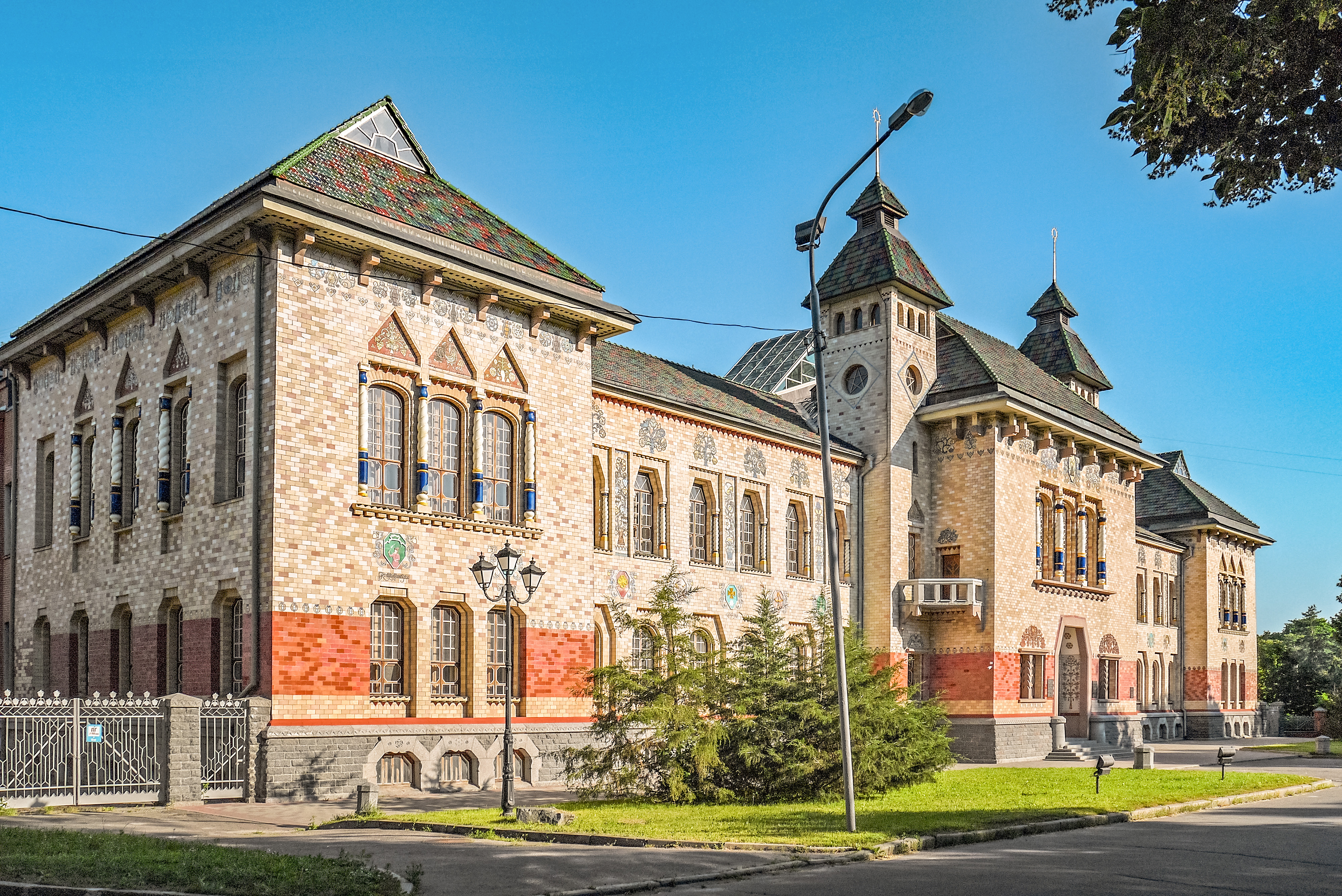
Poltava Governorate Zemstvo Building, built in 1903 and designed by Vasyl Krychevsky. The first building of the style that would later be called Ukrainian Art Nouveau.

Ukrainian Art Nouveau, also known as Ukrainian Architectural Modern (UAM; Ukrainian: Український архітектурний модерн, Неоукраїнський стиль), is an architectural style which emerged during the first decade of the 20th century in connection with the rise of the Ukrainian national movement. Based on folk traditions of house and church construction, as well as examples of Ukrainian Baroque architecture and European Art Nouveau, the style retained prominent positions in Ukrainian architecture for almost 40 years.

== Name ==
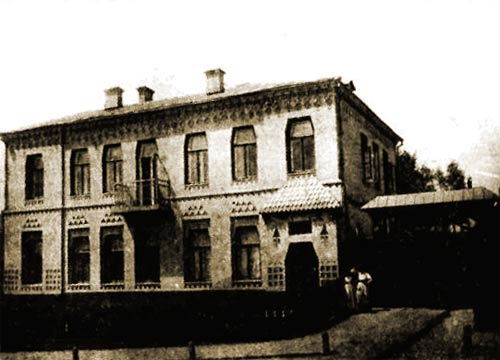
Residential building of I. I. Shchitkivsky at 4-a, Poltavska Street, Kyiv. 1907–1908, architects Vasyl Krychevsky and others.

At the initial stages of its emergence and development, the style had different names: "Ukrainian style", "Ukrainian architectural style", "Ukrainian folk style", "new Ukrainian style" and others. These names are not accurate, because the concepts of Ukrainian architecture and Ukrainian style have much broader meanings, and UAM as a separate style had its own internal trends. In this regard, the architecture historian Viktor Chepelyk notes: "In the history of Ukrainian architecture, no other stylistic phenomenon has been distinguished by such diversity, heterogeneity and contradictions in its name as UAM. Starting from the first publications on this topic in the 1900s and ending with the works of historians in recent years, a search is underway for the optimal name that is able to most fully reveal the nature and features of the phenomenon under study."

In 1903, when Vasyl Krychevsky proposed his design of the Poltava Governorate Zemstvo Building, his project's style was classified as Neo-Moorish due to its unconventional architectural forms.

The names associated with the UAM reflected the characteristic worldviews of those who used them. The first to call the new style the "modernized Ukrainian style" was probably the prominent UAM artist Yevhen Serdyuk, followed by H. O. Kovalenko, who introduced the term "Ukrainian Art Nouveau" (український модерн, ukrajinskyj modern). According to Viktor Chepelyk, the most frequently used name for the style in literature is Ukrainian Art Nouveau or its variants.

== History ==
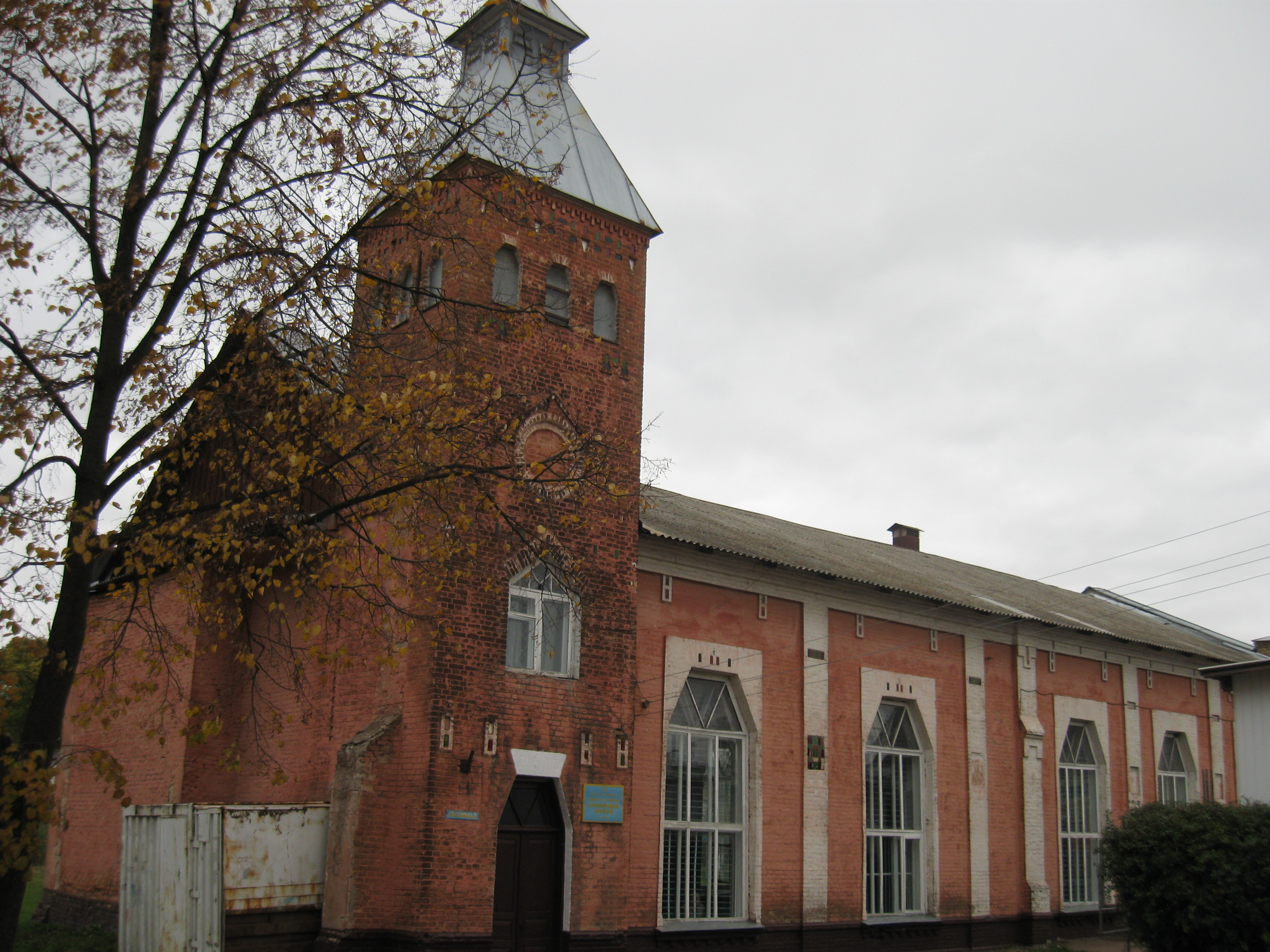
Former power plant in Nizhyn (now sports school)

The UAM is based on the forms of Ukrainian folk house and church architecture. In this regard, it is worth noting that for the first time, elements of Ukrainian folk architecture began to be used by professional architects back in the 19th century (e.g., Galagan's House in Lebedyntsi).

The achievements of ethnography and the study of folk architecture and folk construction traditions led to the emergence among architects of the idea of creating their own architectural style, folk in its essence. The first to implement this idea in 1903 was Vasyl Krychevsky in the design of the Poltava Governorate Zemstvo Building (1903–1908), which became the first work in the Ukrainian Art Nouveau style. Almost simultaneously with it, the I. P. Kotliarevsky School in Poltava (1903–1908, architects Yevhen Serdyuk and M. V. Stasyukov) and the Intercession Church in the village of Plishyvets (1902–1906, architect I. S. Kuznetsov), were built in this new style. These were the first objects built in the style that would later be called the Ukrainian Art Nouveau. Regarding these three objects, Viktor Chepelyk writes: "These three monuments initiated three most important, almost multi-vector, directions of artistic searches of the UAM: the Intercession Church outlined the future development of neo-Baroque tendencies, the Poltava Zemstvo Building was aimed at affirming the Decorative-Romanesque direction, which began to be called the folk style, the I. P. Kotliarevsky school was aimed at rationalist searches". The successful beginning gave rise to a movement for the creation of a native style. The development of the architecture of the UAM took place almost simultaneously in all regions of Ukraine.

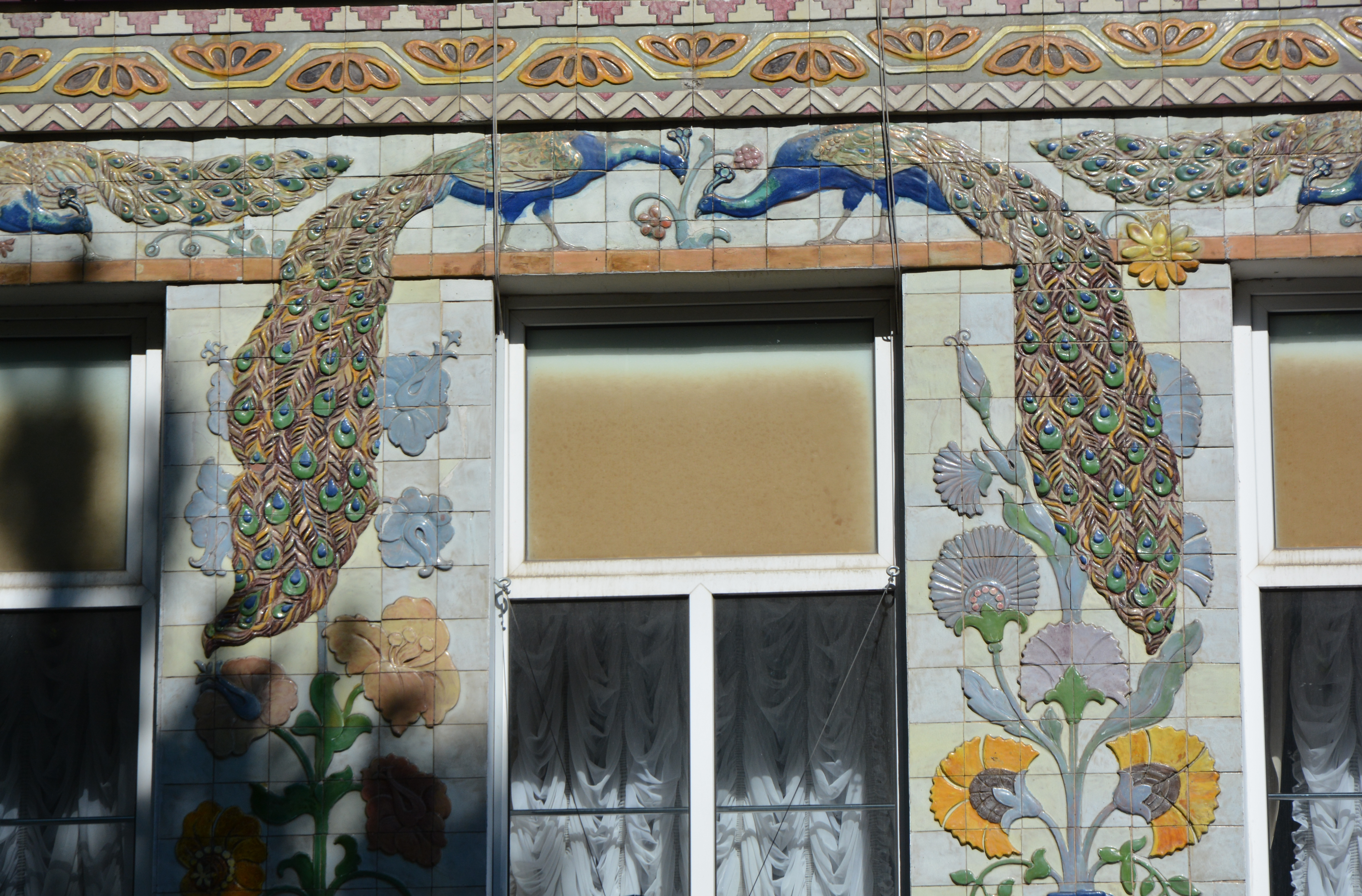
Floral ornaments and exotic birds in the outside decor of Khrennikov House in Dnipro

Since 1903, Opanas Slastion had taken the lead in developing the theory of the Ukrainian Art Nouveau. He formulated the principles of UAM morphology and in every way contributed to the spread and establishment of this style. Circles for the study of Ukrainian folk architecture appear. Thus, students of the Institute of Civil Engineers, who would later become prominent figures of UAM, in 1905 organized an illegal circle for the study of Ukrainian architecture; every summer they would go around the villages and make sketches of houses, barns, churches, and bell towers. In Kharkov, the Ukrainian Art and Architecture Department was established under the Literary and Art Circle, which set itself the goal of "spreading the Ukrainian style" and Ukrainian art in general, as well as "preserving other monuments of Ukraine and reviving Ukrainian architecture." The honorary chairman of the circle was Ilya Repin, and the chairman was Serhii Vasylkivsky. Numerous publications appear in specialized and popular magazines. The style was noted for its originality and correspondence to modern life and new demands.

In addition to UAM, other Art Nouveau styles originating from the European tradition were also widespread in Ukraine. Compared to European Art Nouveau, Ukrainian Art Nouveau is characterized by a greater time lag: 38 years instead of 20 due to unfavorable development conditions and forced interruptions.

== Stages of development ==
Viktor Chepelyk divides the Ukrainian Art Nouveau into three stages:

1. 1903–1917. A period of rapid development of UAM, with two varieties: folk style (romanticism) and rationalistic modernism (more restrained). The decor in the architecture of buildings was intense, picturesque, developed folk themes, enriched with motifs that came from the European architectural tradition.
2. Post-revolutionary period. After the occupation of Ukraine by the Bolsheviks, many of the Ukrainian Art Academy figures ended up in emigration. Many were arrested and charged under political motivation. Under the threat of reprisals, some renounced their views on UAM. The main directions of the development of architecture in the 1920s and 1930s were rationalism and constructivism. The UAM was much less widespread.
3. 1934–1941. There was a certain revival in the development of the UAM, but the oppression continued. The oppression became one of the factors that stopped the development of the UAM.

After 1941–1945, UAM elements were used by individual architects, but their works are few and little known.

== Development centers ==
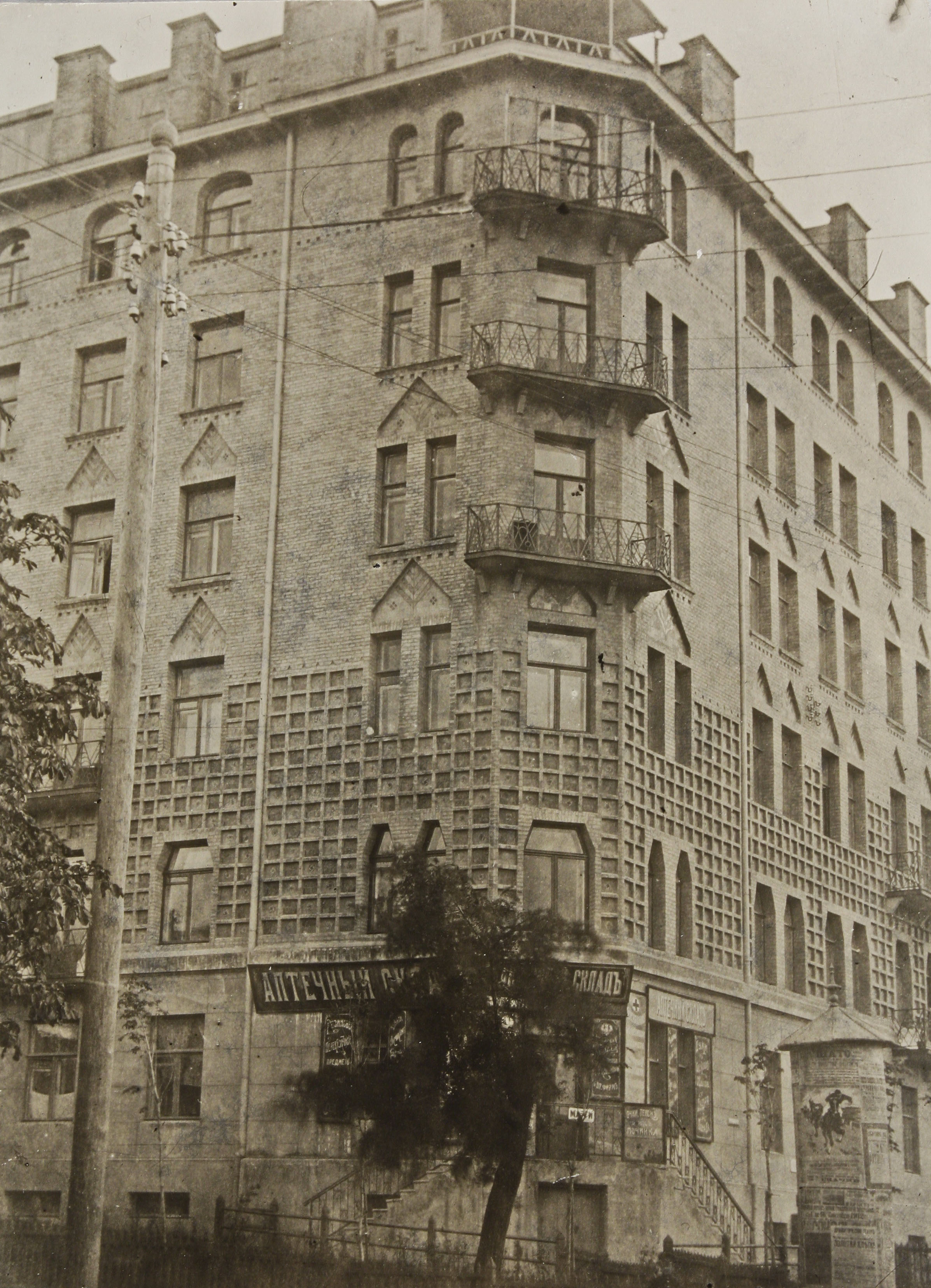
Hrushevsky Building before its destruction in 1918

There were several UAM development centers.

=== Kiev ===
The first house built in Kiev in the Ukrainian Art Nouveau style was the house of I. I. Shchitkivskyi at 4 Poltavska Street (1907–1908). This ordinary two-story house was made of wood and faced with brick, and had a flat façade with seven windows per floor.

It was in Kiev that the first engineering structure in the UAM style was built — the building of the city sewage treatment plant in Saperna Slobidka (architect Mykola Damilovsky). A narodnyi dim in the village of Kryve was also built according to his design.

The architecture of the Kiev center is characterized by a more developed rationalist direction of the UAM.

The residential building at 8 Pankivska Street was built by the architect Mykola Shekhonin by order of the doctor Yosyp Yurkevych.

Another building in Pankivska Street was redesigned in the Ukrainian Art Nouveau style by Vasyl Krychevsky on the order of its owner, historian Mykhailo Hrushevsky. The building was destroyed as a result of shelling by Russian Bolsheviks in 1918.

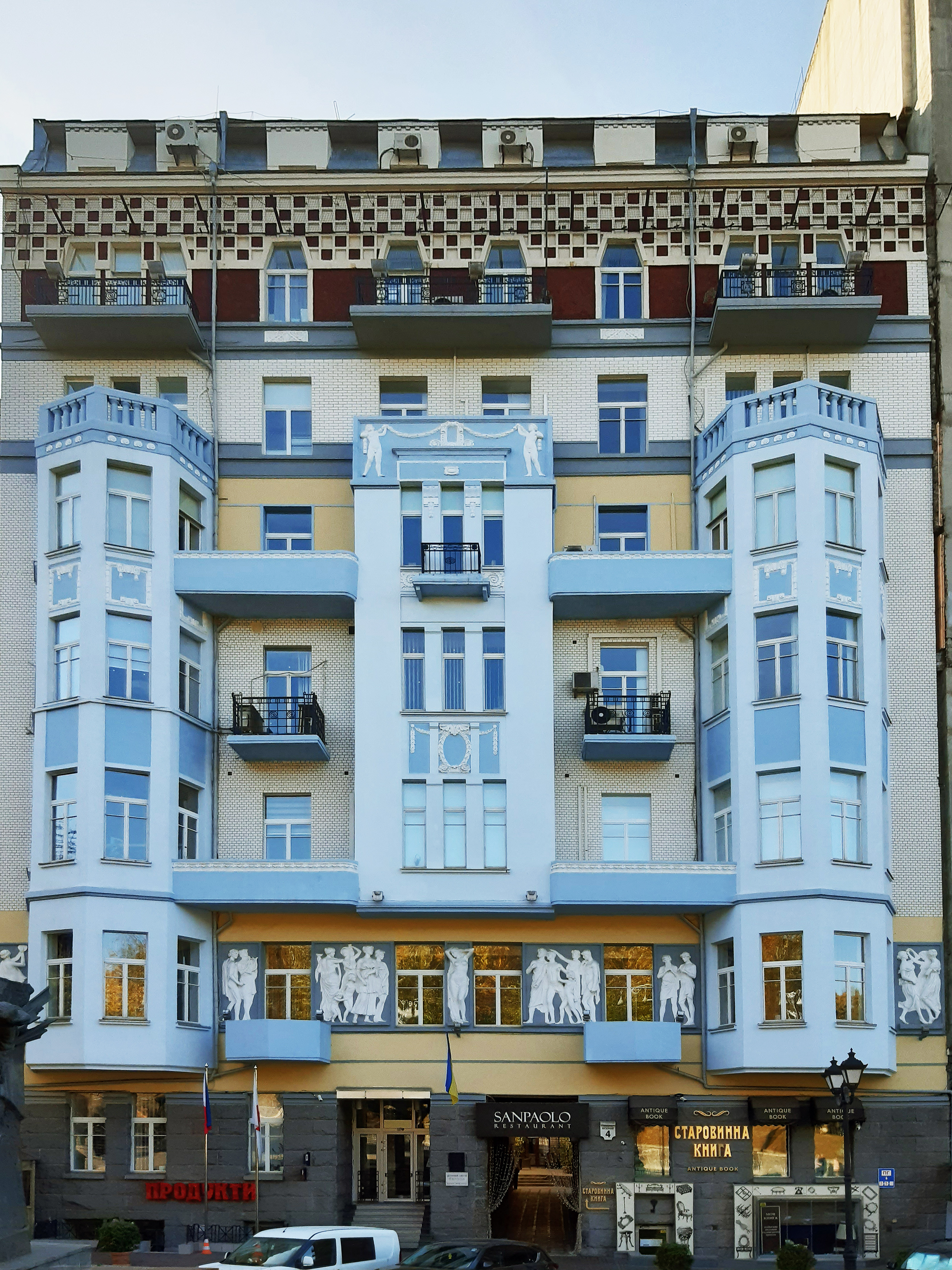
4 Muzeinyi Lane, 1909

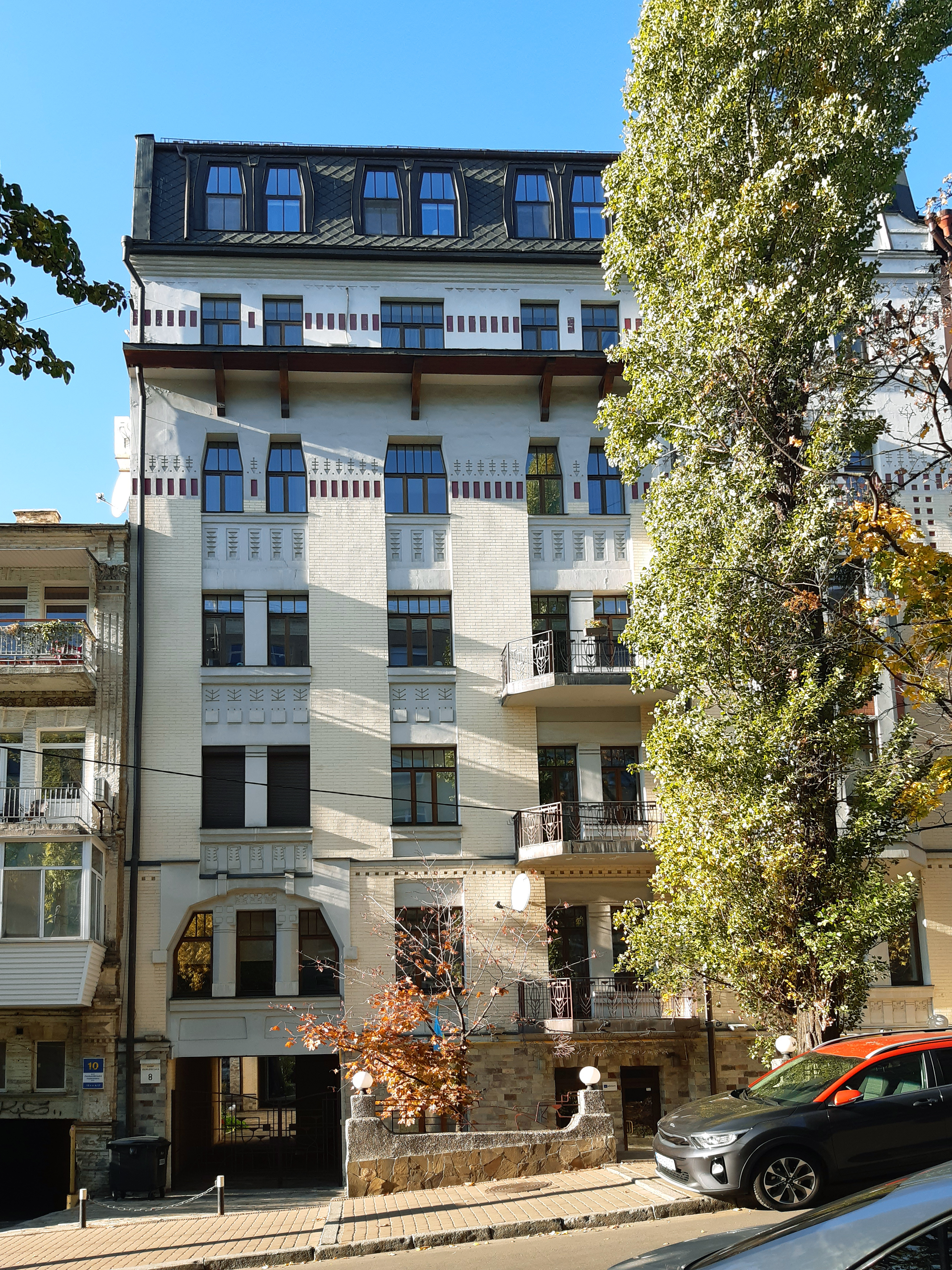
Residential building at 8 Pankivska Street, 1910

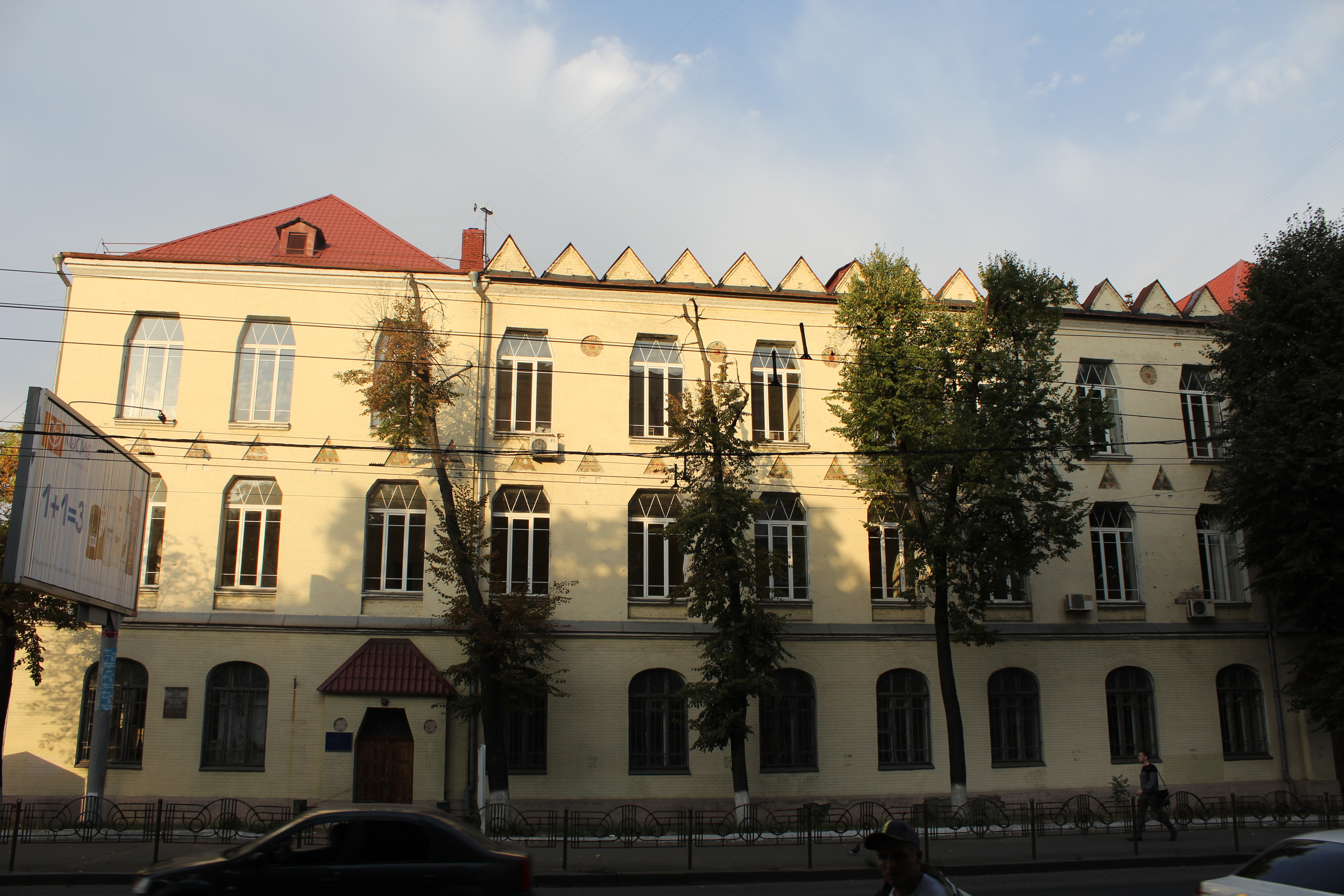
Hrushevskyi College, 1911

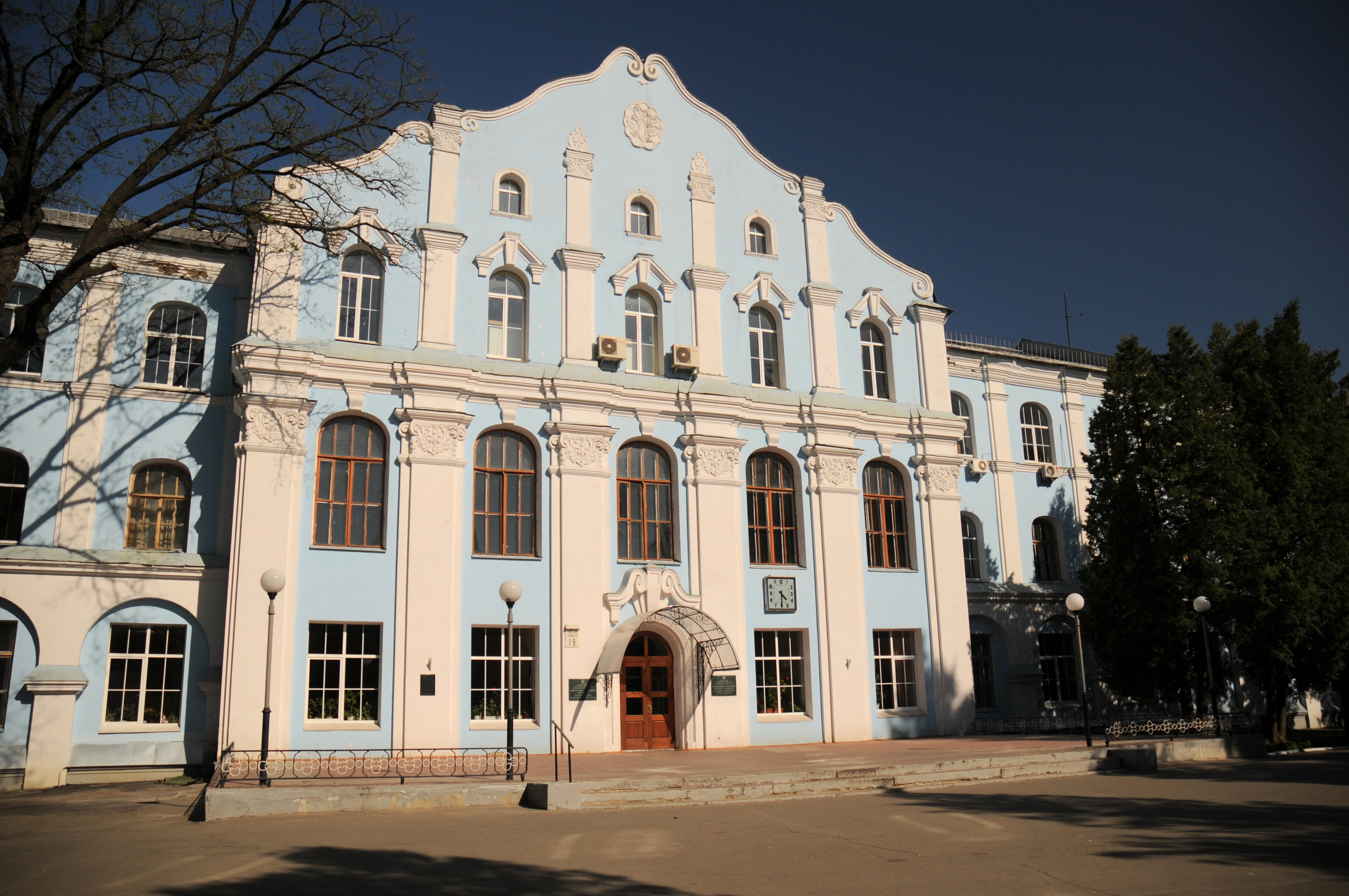
Forest Engineering Institute, 1927

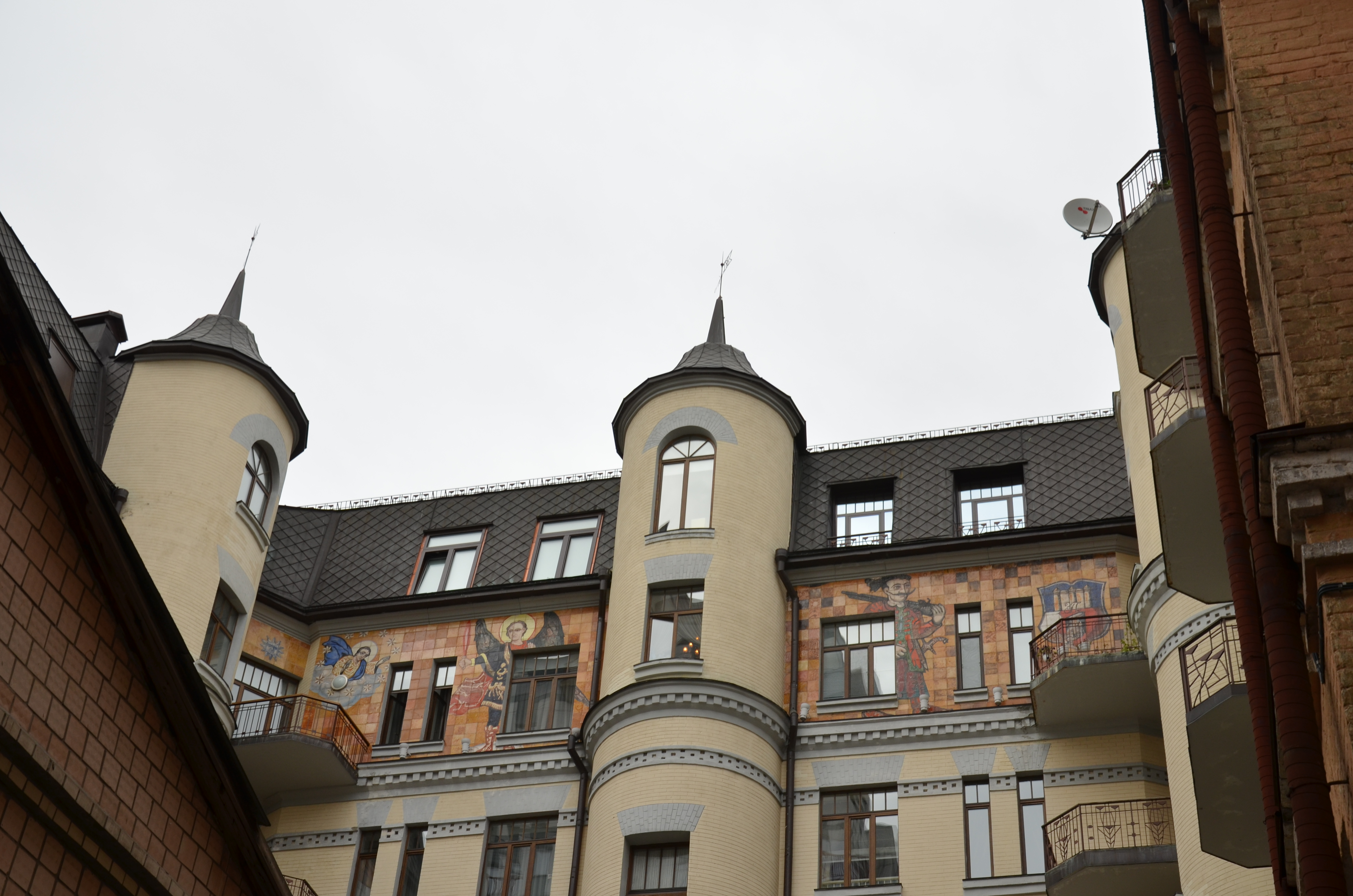
Decorative figures on the back side of the building at 8 Pankivska Street

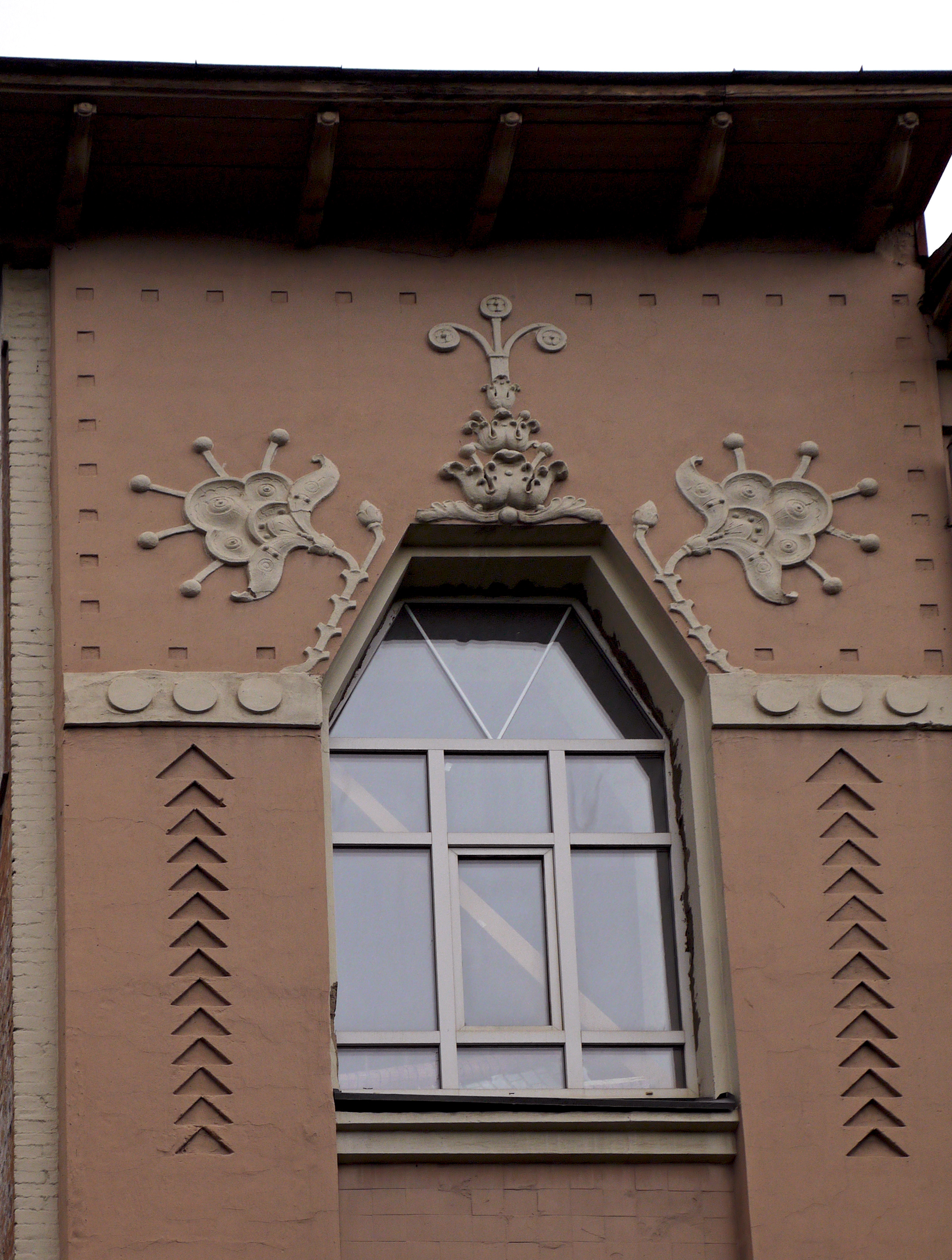
Decorative elements on the building of Kyiv Commercial School

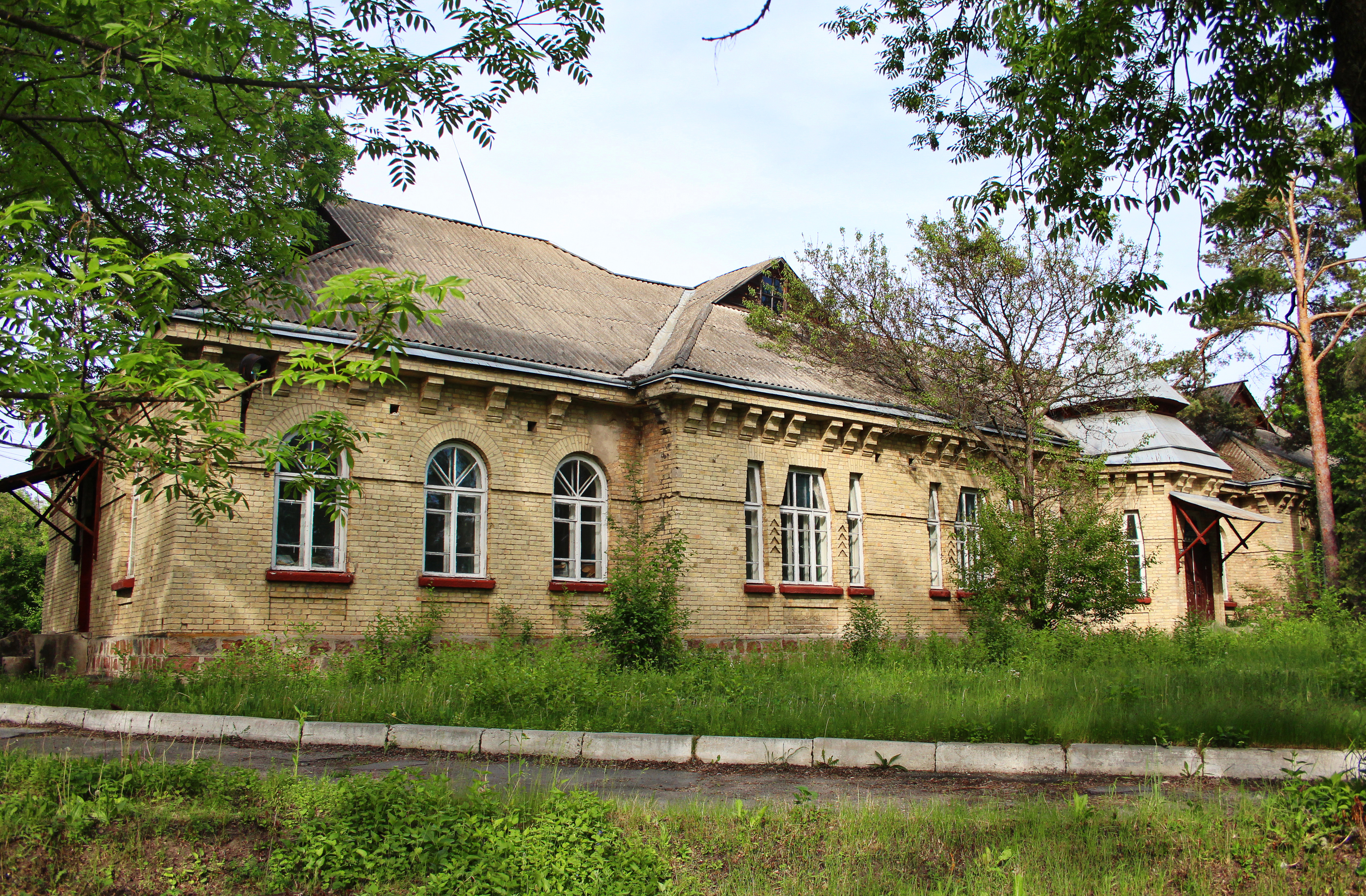
Zemstvo hospital in Stebliv

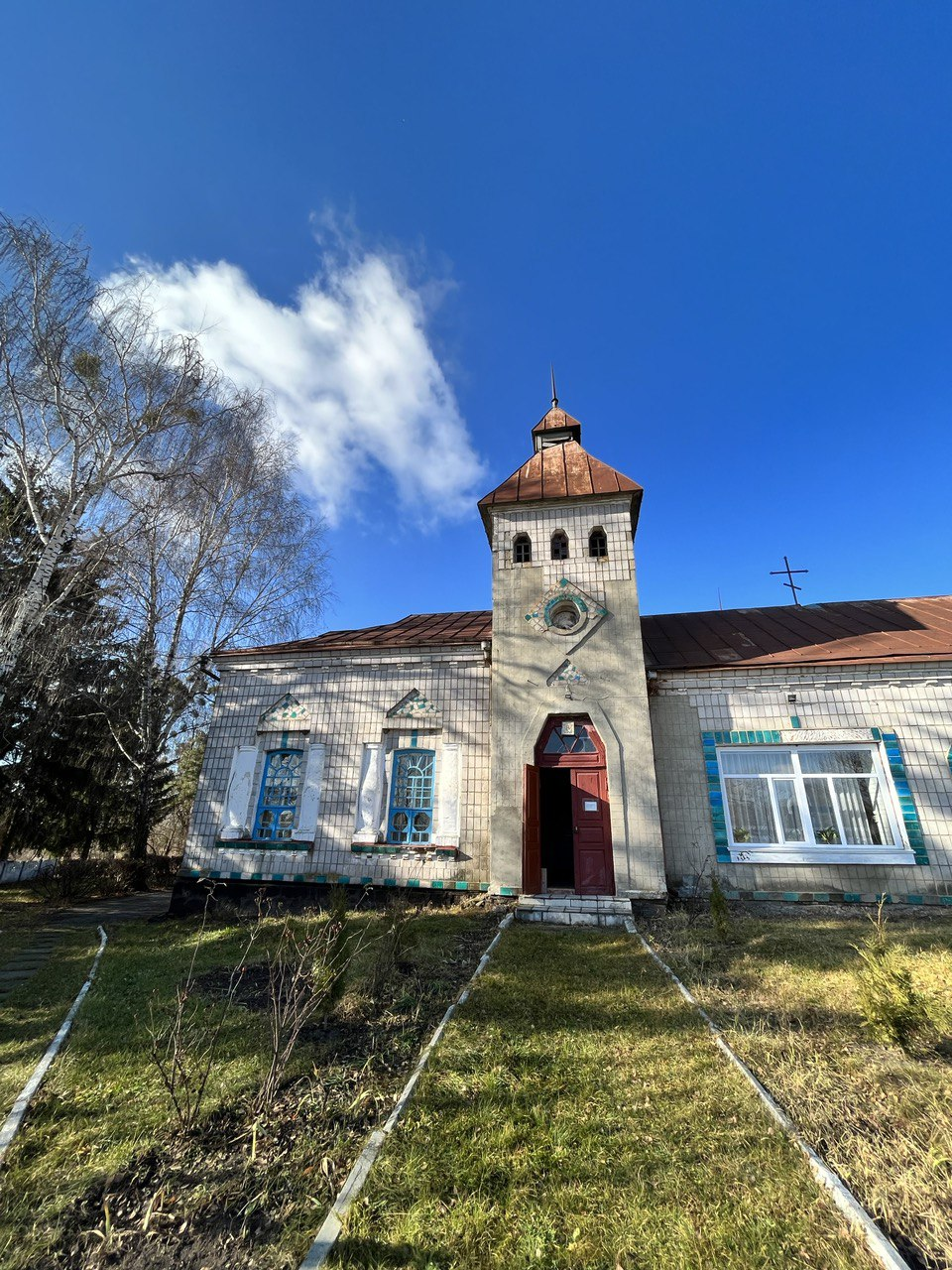
People's House in Kryve

=== Poltava ===
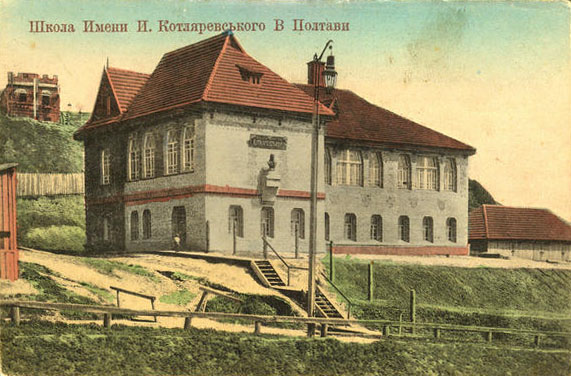
I. P. Kotliarevsky School in Poltava, finished in 1905 (lost)

The first three buildings in the style of Ukrainian Art Nouveau were built near Poltava.

In 1903–1908, the first was built Poltava Governorate Zemstvo Building, designed by the architect Vasyl Krychevsky.

In 1902–1906, the architect and artist I. S. Kuznetsov built the Intercession Church in the village of Plishyvets.

In 1903–1905, the architects Yevhen Serdyuk and Mykola Stasyukov built the I. P. Kotliarevsky school in Poltava.

In 1916, the Opishnia Pottery Education and Demonstration Center of the Poltava Governorate Zemstvo was built by the design of Vasyl Krychevsky and ceramist Yuriy Lebishchak.

Also, UAM manifested itself in the project of zemstvo schools, implemented by Opanas Slastion. Today, 53 schools are known to have remained on the territory of the former Lokhvytsia Zemstvo (now parts of Lubny Raion in Poltava Oblast, Romny Raion in Sumy Oblast, and Pryluky Raion in Chernihiv Oblast). They are being studied by a public project with the same name Schools of Lokhvytsia Zemstvo.

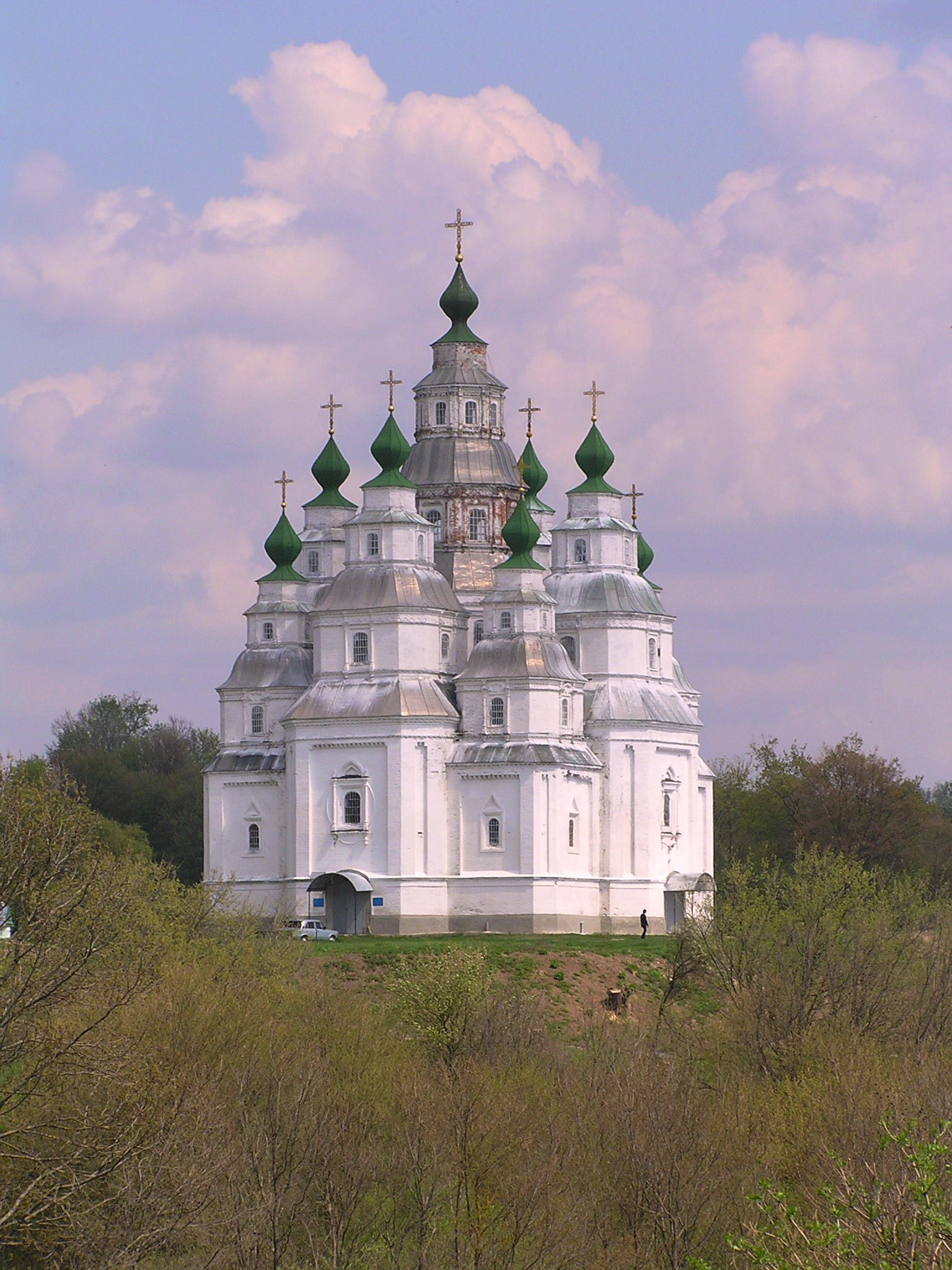
Intercession Church in Plishyvets, 1907

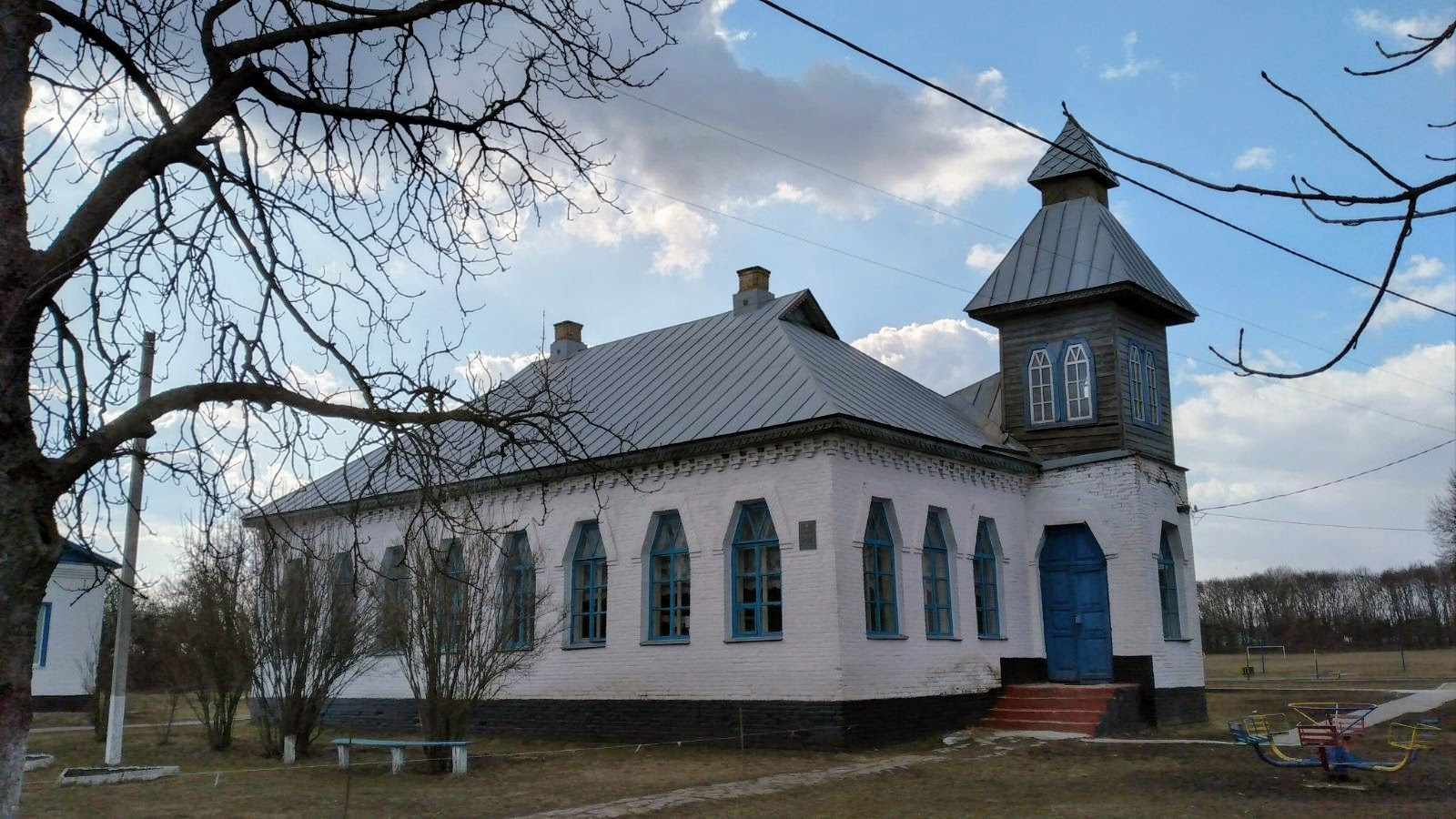
Zemstvo school in Hiltsi

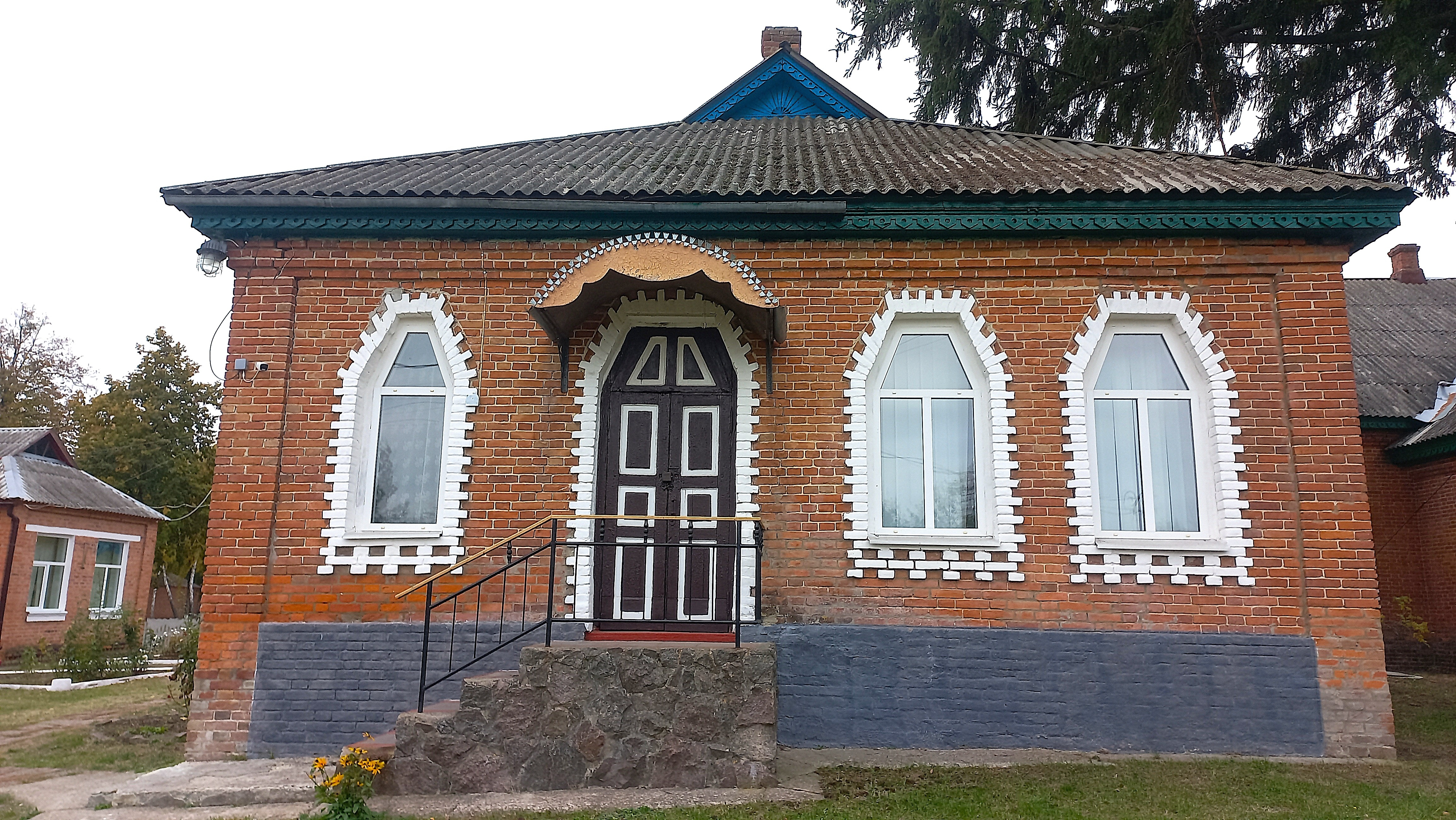
The school in Yaroshivka

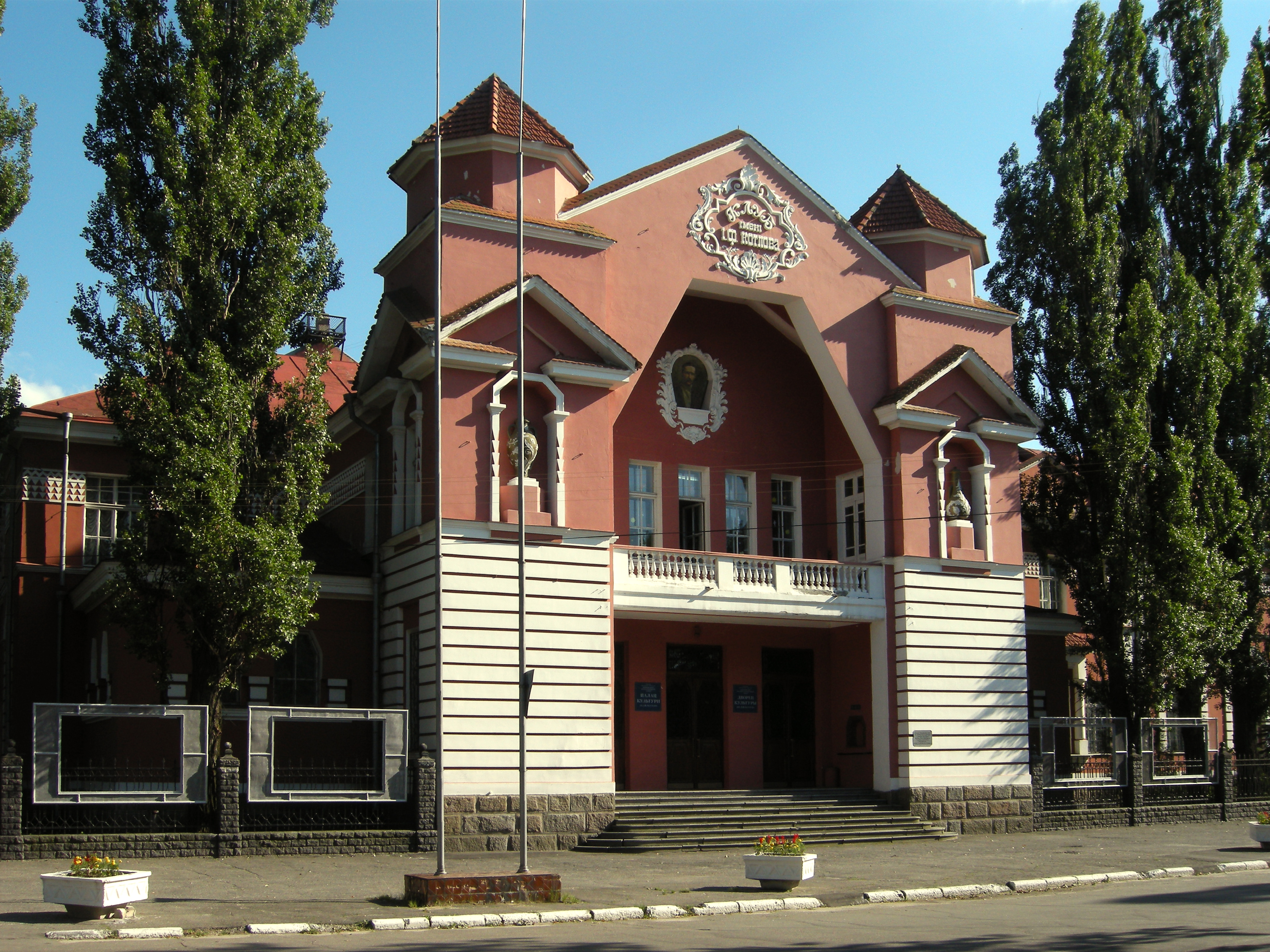
Kriukiv palace of culture, Kremenchuk, 1927

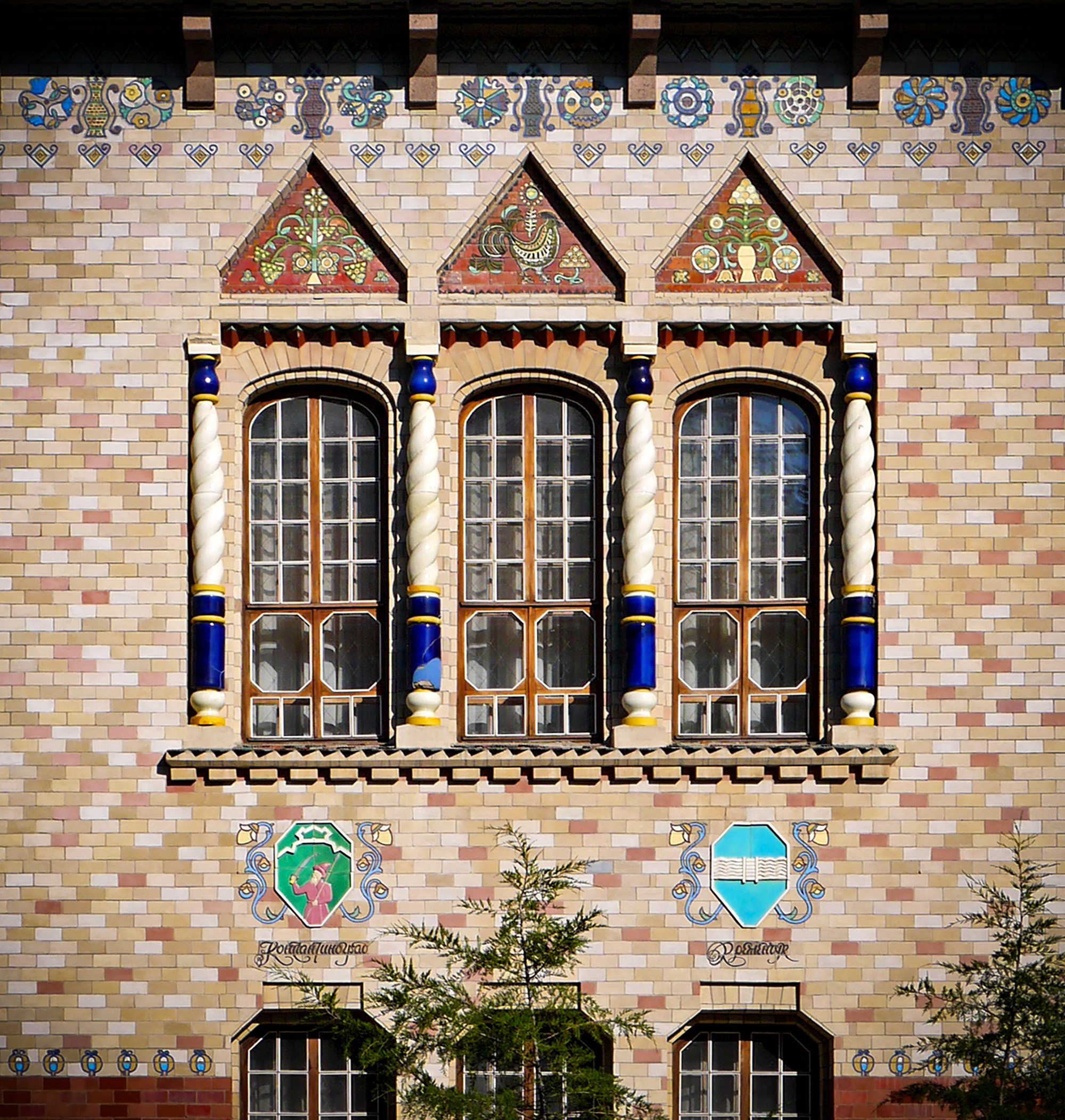
Decorative elements adorning the Poltava Zemstvo building

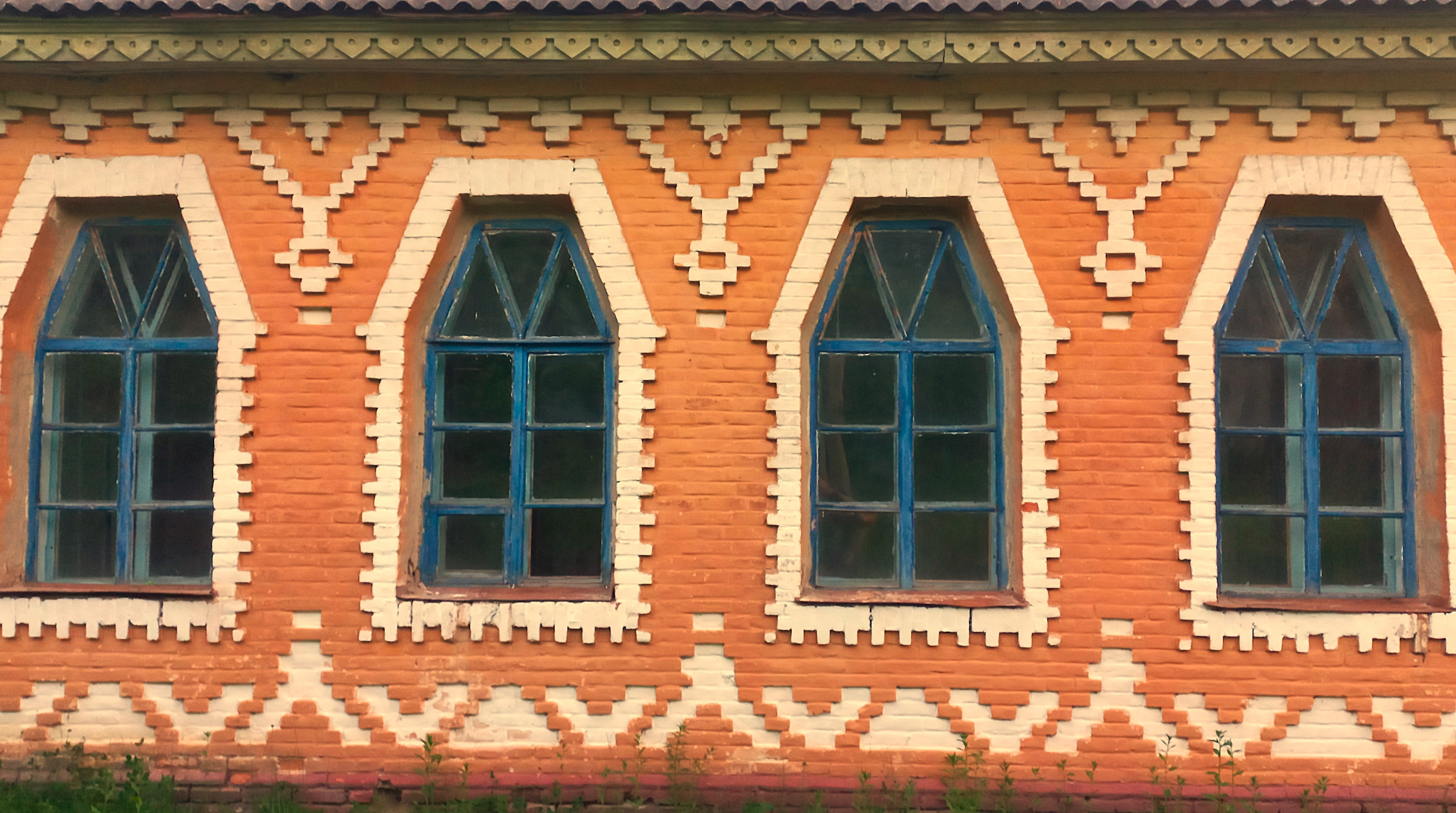
Fragment of the façade of the school in Brahyntsi

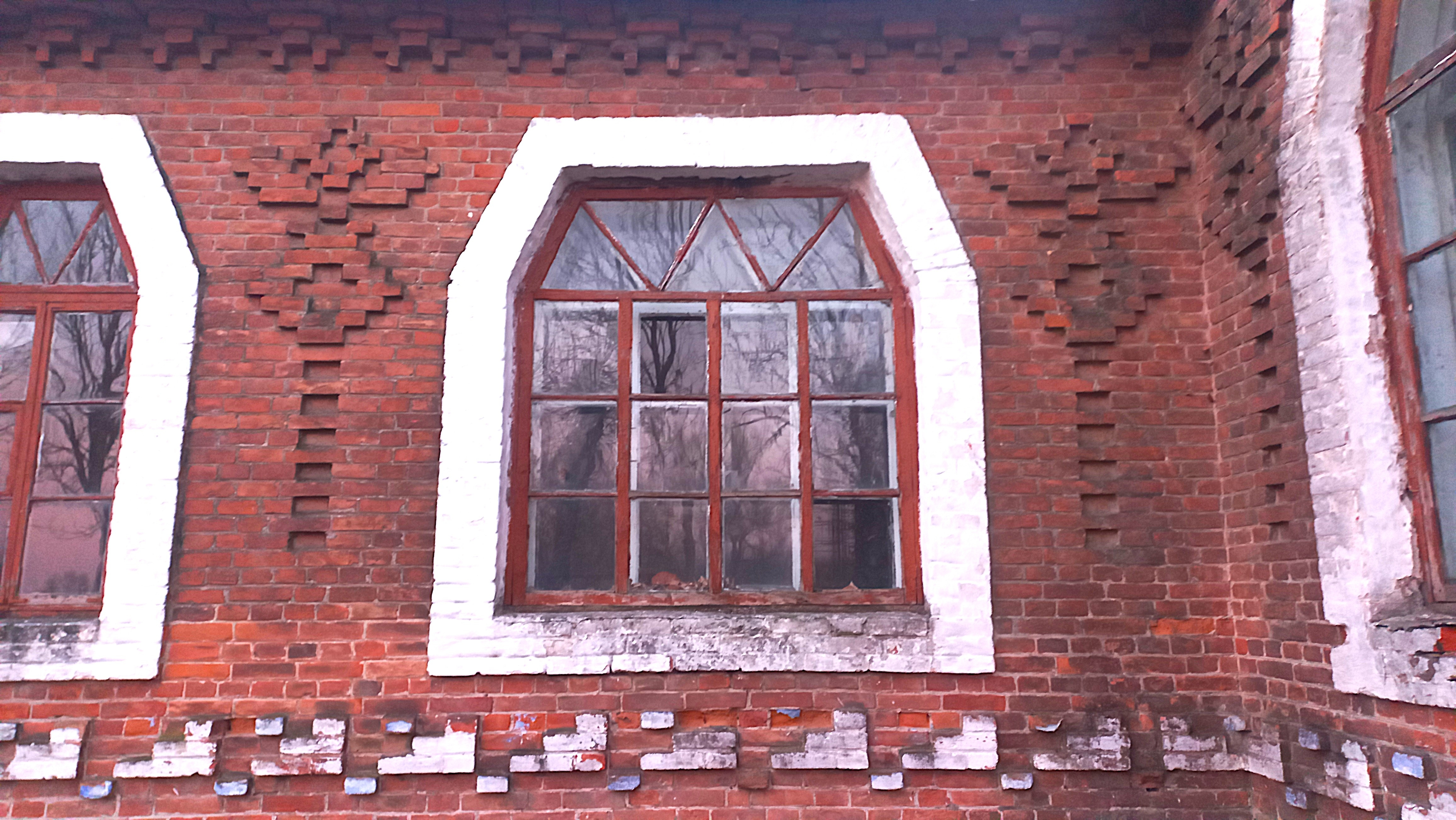
Fragment of the façade of the school in Zavodske

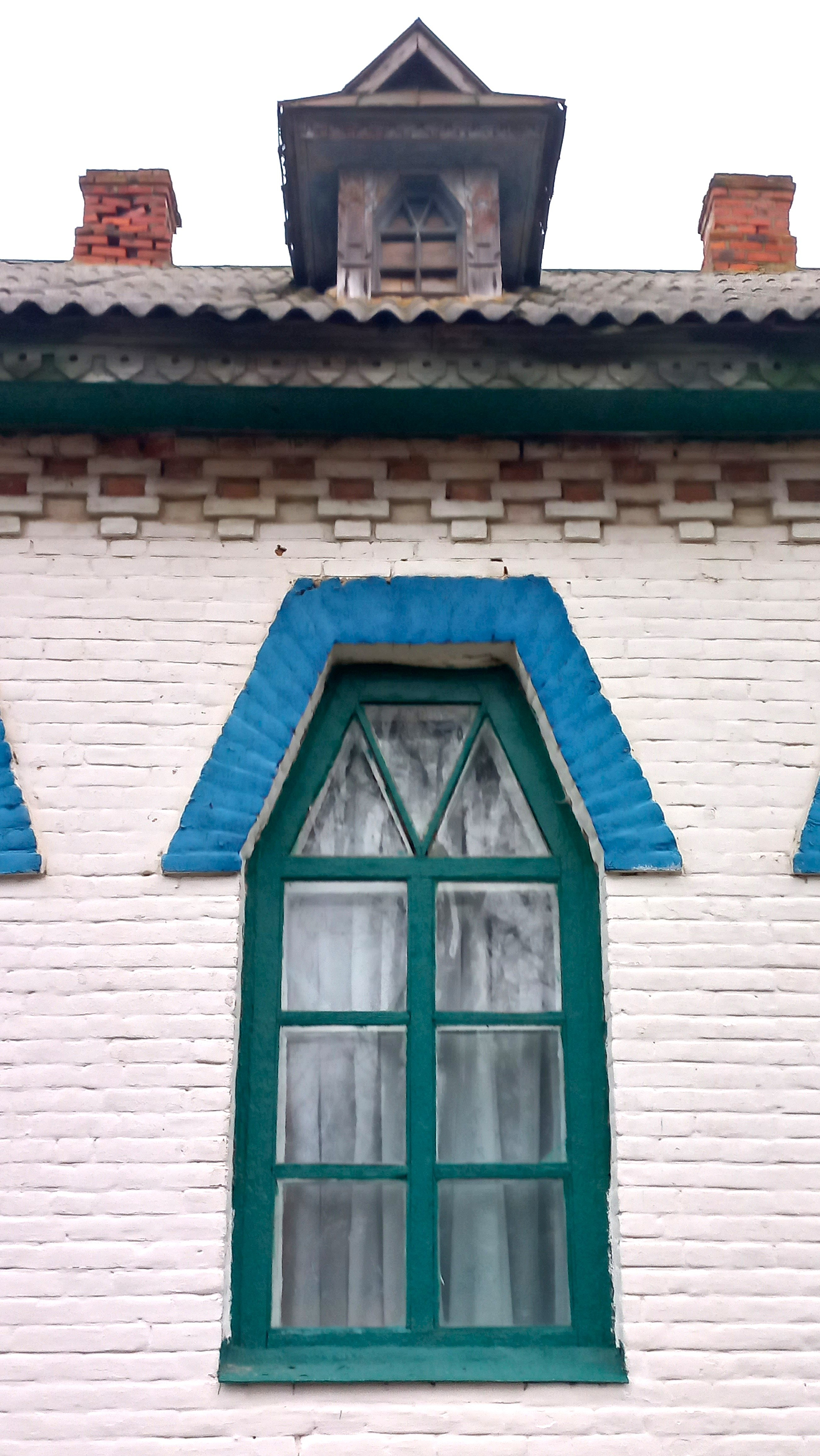
Fragment of the façade of the school in Ostapivka

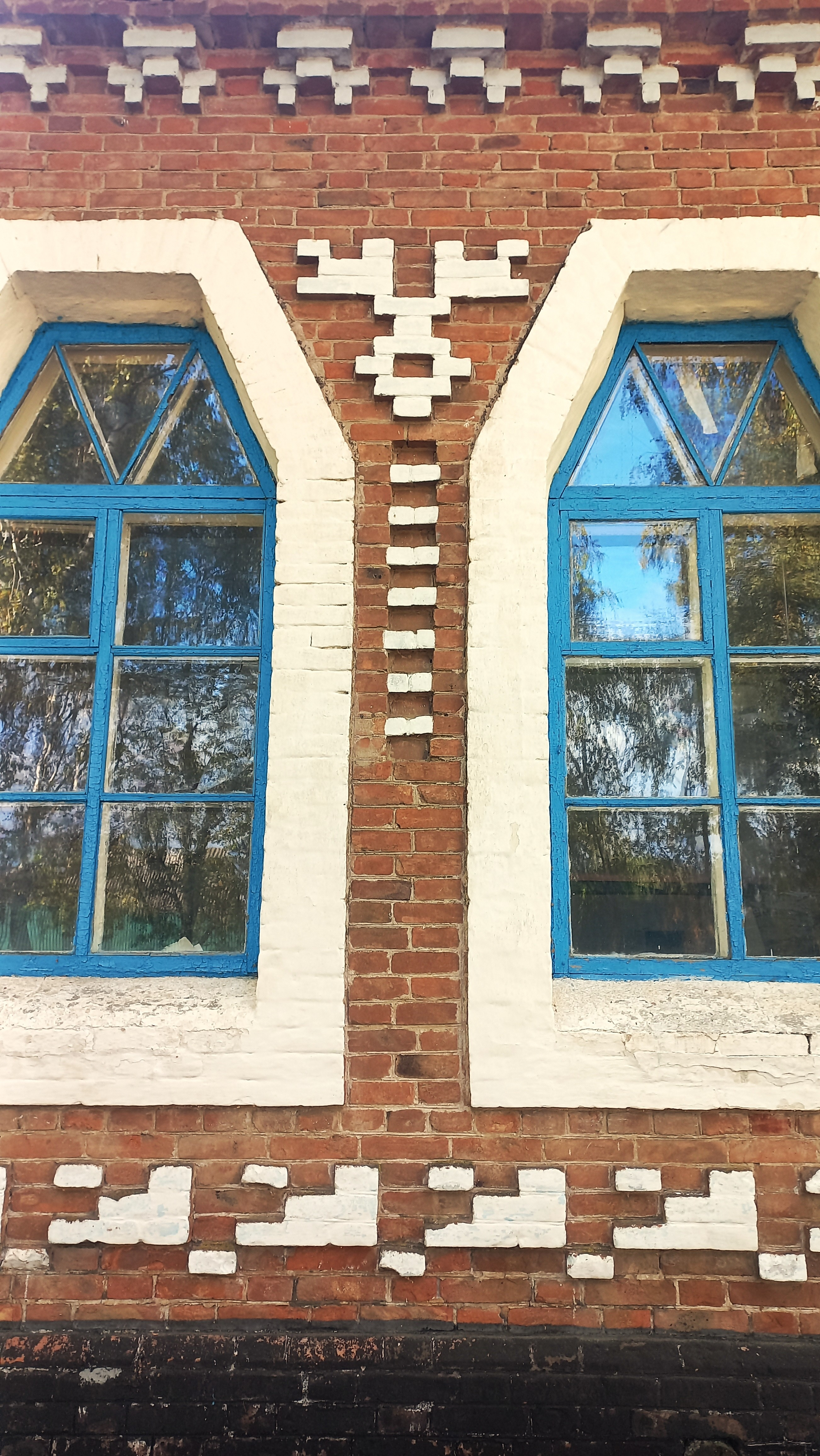
Fragment of the façade of the school in Haivshchyna

=== Kharkiv ===
The idea of creating a new Ukrainian architectural style originated among the residents of Kharkiv. This idea was first implemented by the Kharkov architect artist Vasyl Krychevsky in the building of the Poltava Governorate Zemstvo, and Kharkiv residents Serhiy Vasylkivsky, M. S. Samokysh and M. M. Uvarov painted its interior.

In Kharkov, Yevhen Serdyuk and Zdzisław Charmański built the first complex of buildings for scientific research purposes in the Ukrainian Art Nouveau style: the Kharkiv Agricultural Selection Station (1909–1911), which is now the Research Institute of Plant Breeding, Selection and Genetics.

Different trends of the UAM existed in and around Kharkov. The Kharkov Center of the Ukrainian Art Nouveau made a significant contribution to the development of the style both in terms of the number of buildings and in its theoretical developments.

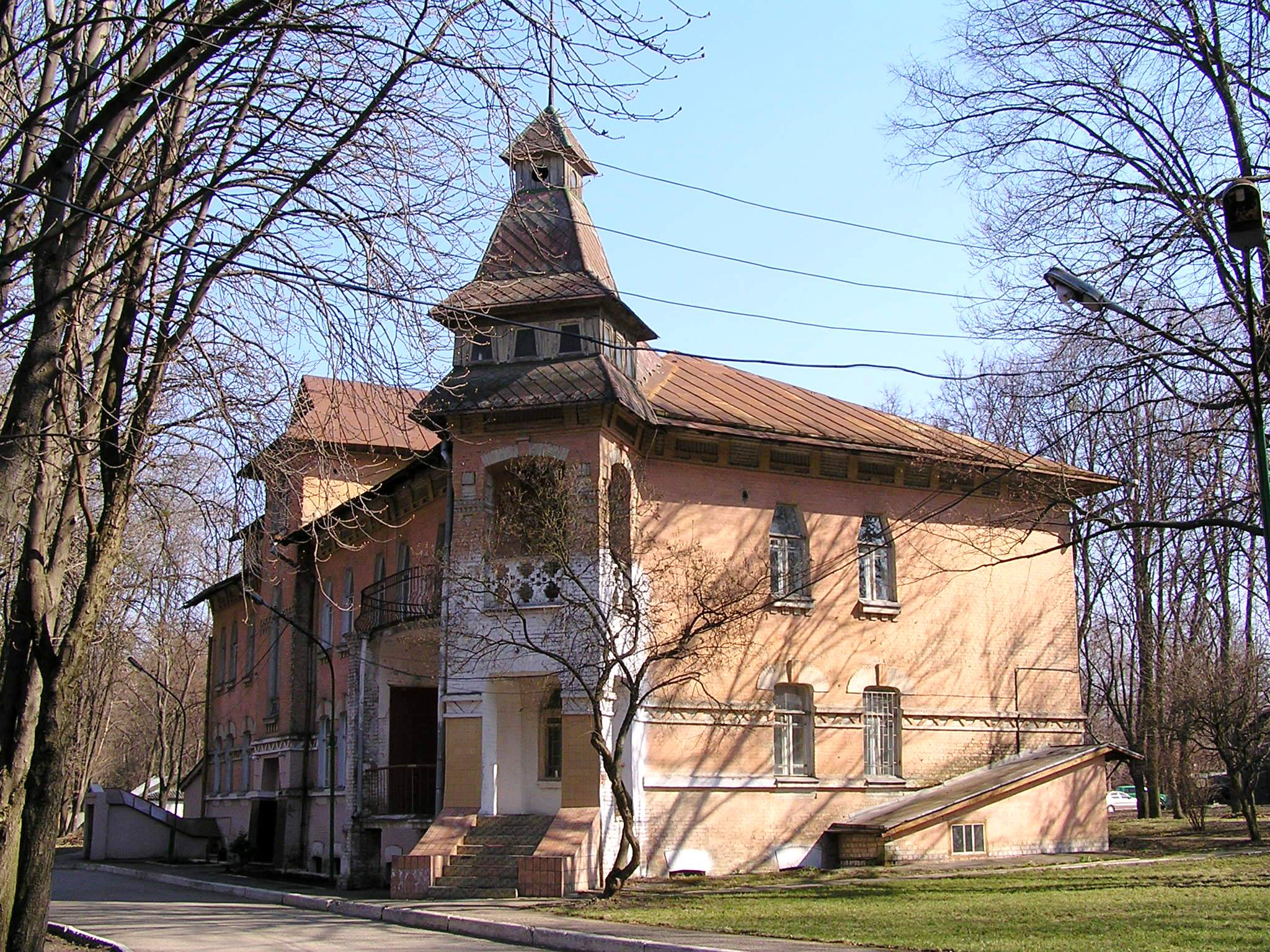
Kharkiv Agricultural Selection Station, 1911

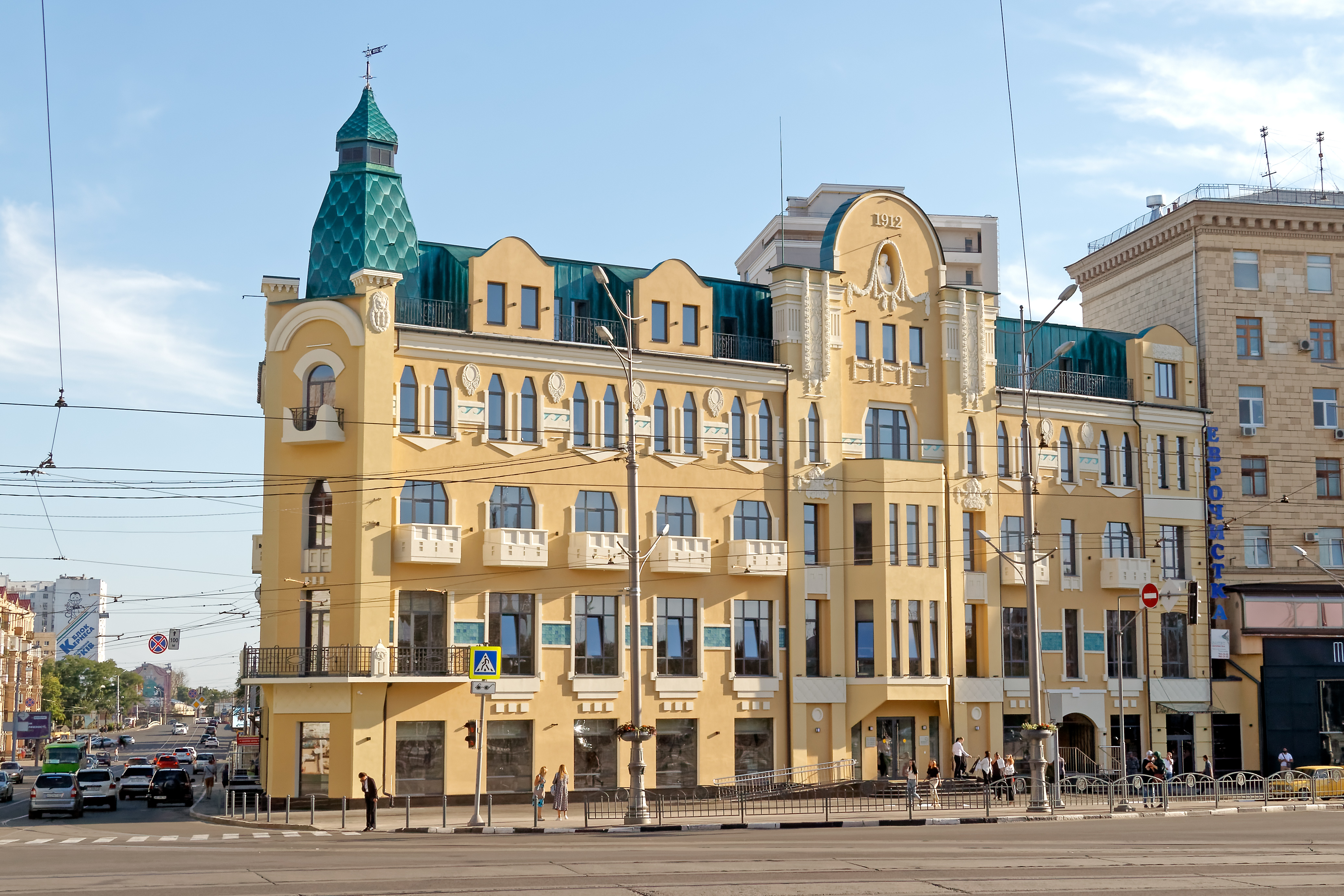
Piotrovsky's House in Kharkiv, 1912

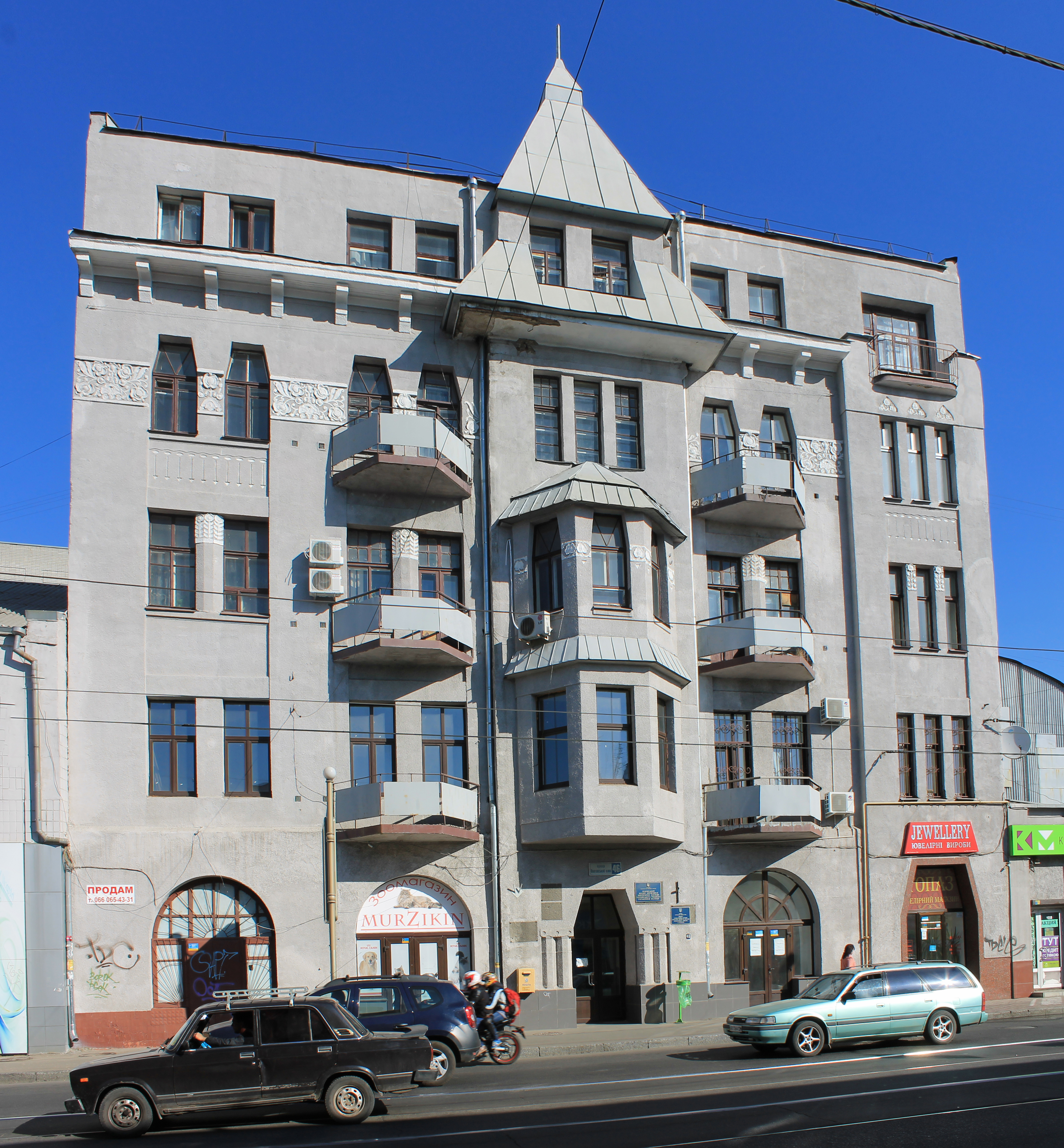
Popov's Building, 1912

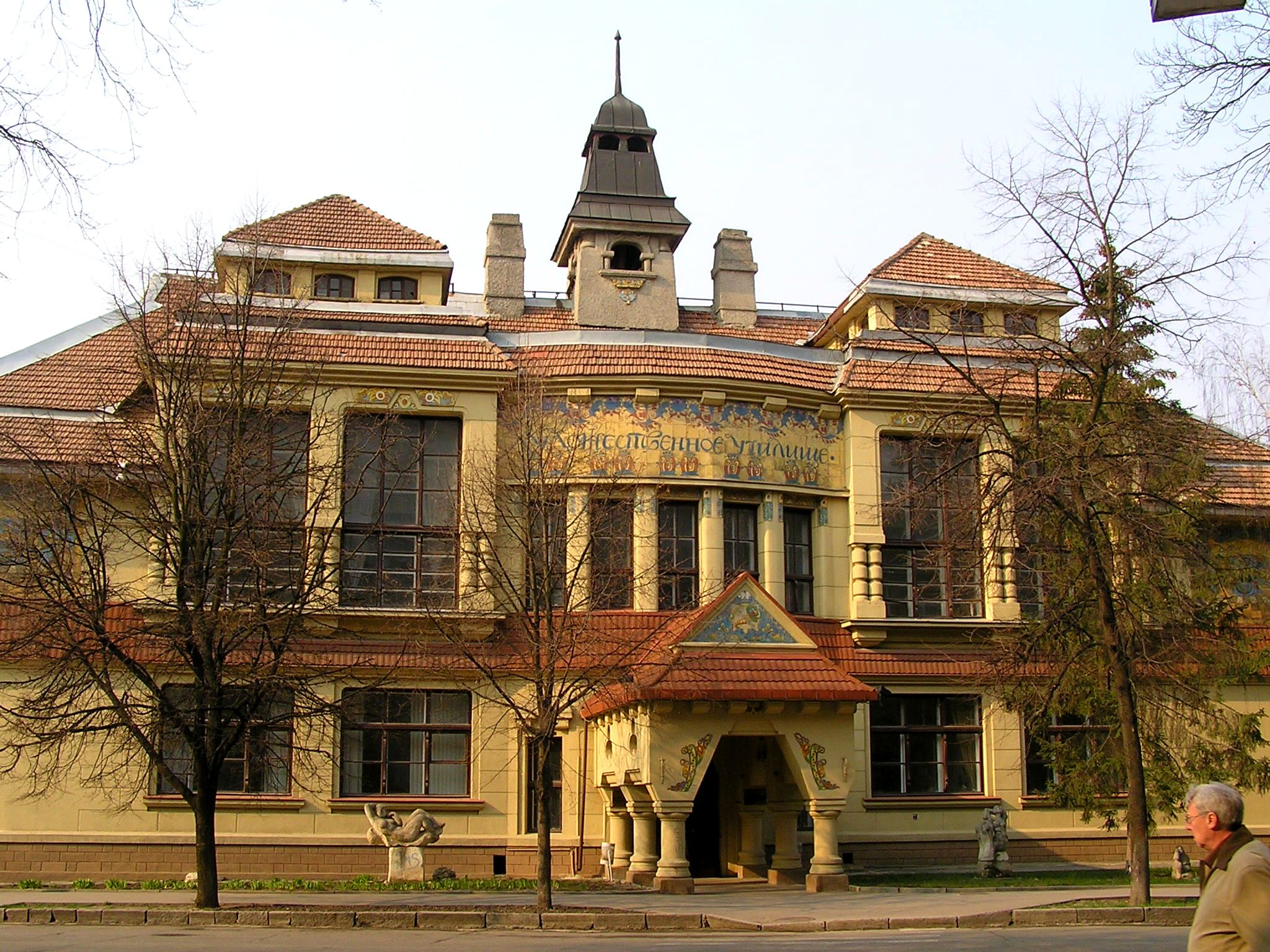
Kharkiv Art School, 1913

=== Lviv ===
Lviv architects produced local versions of the Ukrainian Art Nouveau, in which regional features preceded those coming from eastern Ukraine. At the same time, the desire of Lviv artists to at least partially pick up and develop some characteristic forms of the folk architecture of the Dnieper region, in particular trapezoidal openings in portals and windows, is quite eloquent, although these themes in Galicia never became as dominant as in Central and Eastern Ukraine.

The most famous building in this style in Lviv is the building of the Dnister Insurance Company (20 Ruska Street), designed by architect Ivan Levynskyi.

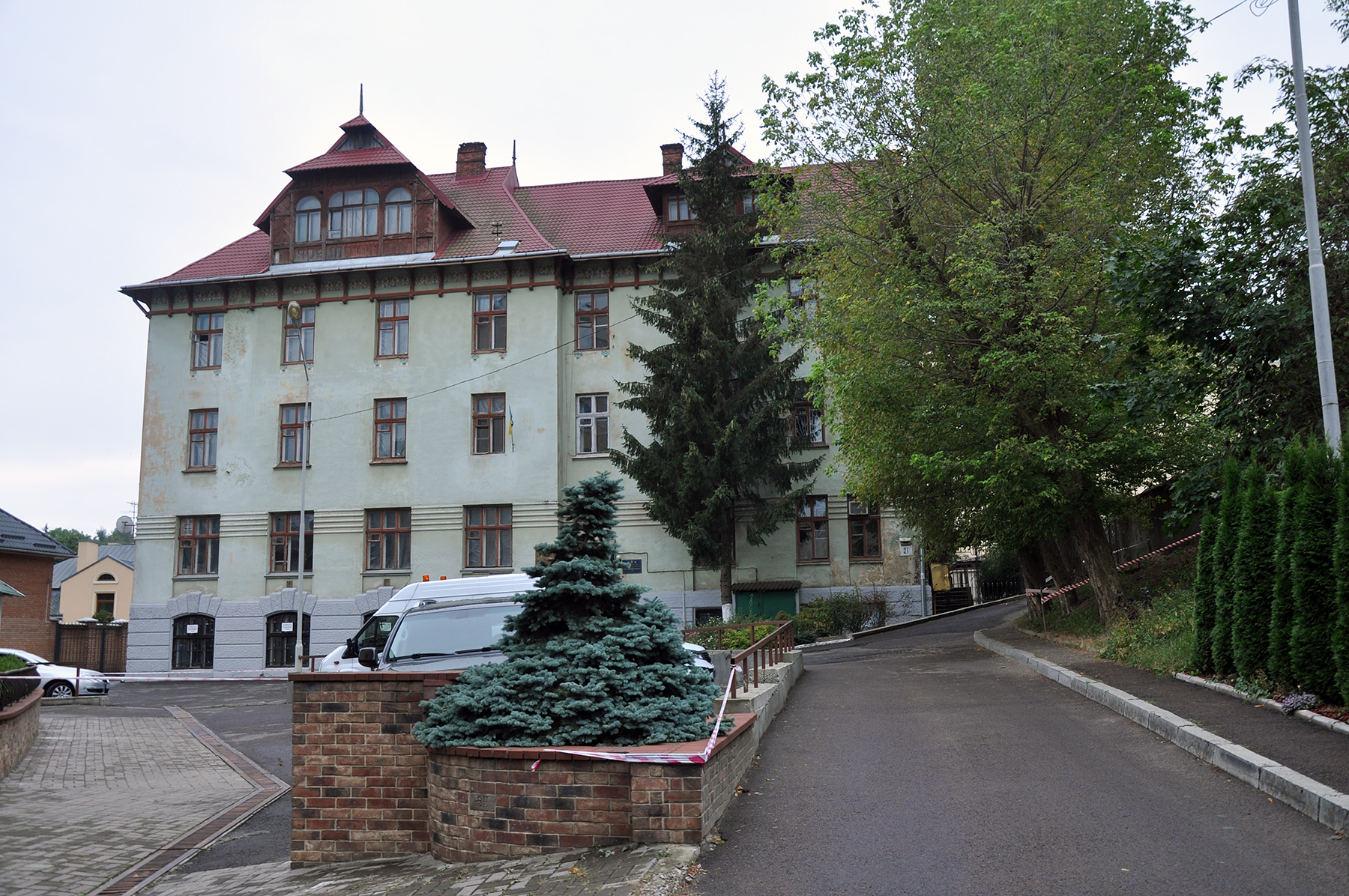
21 Kotsiubynskoho Street, 1905

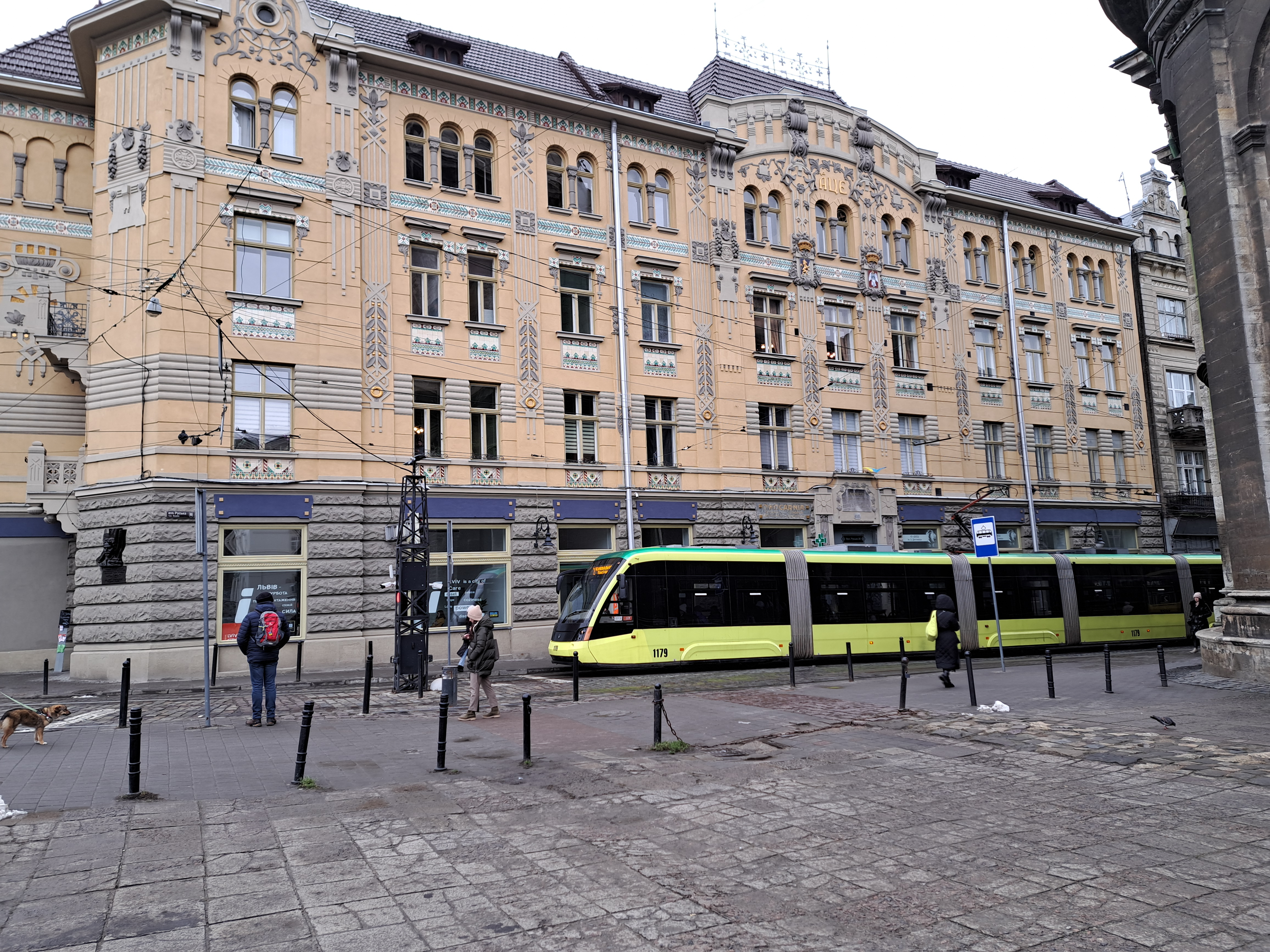
Dnister Society building, 1906

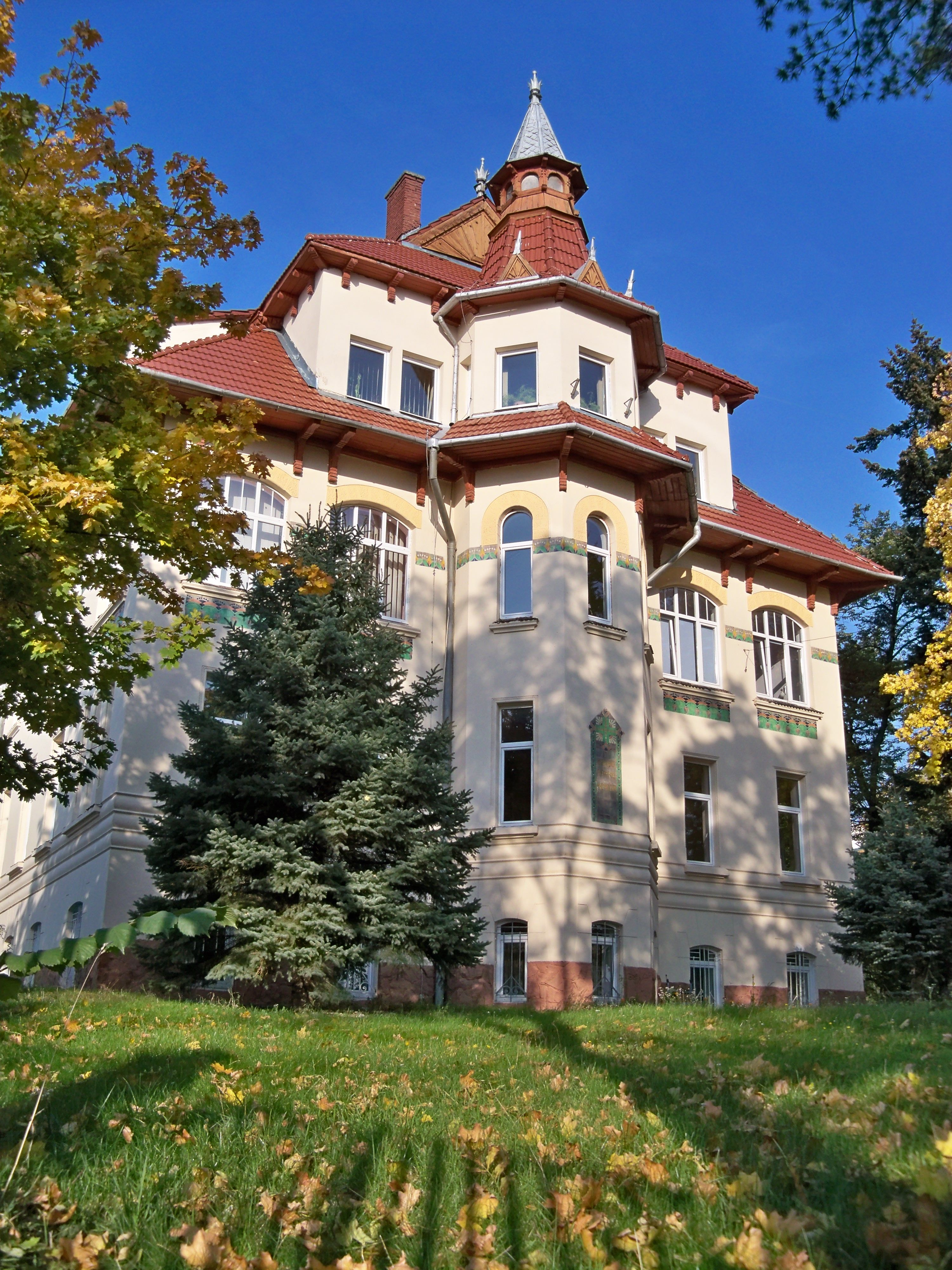
Solecki Clinic, whose architecture used folk Hutsul and Zakopane motifs, 1908

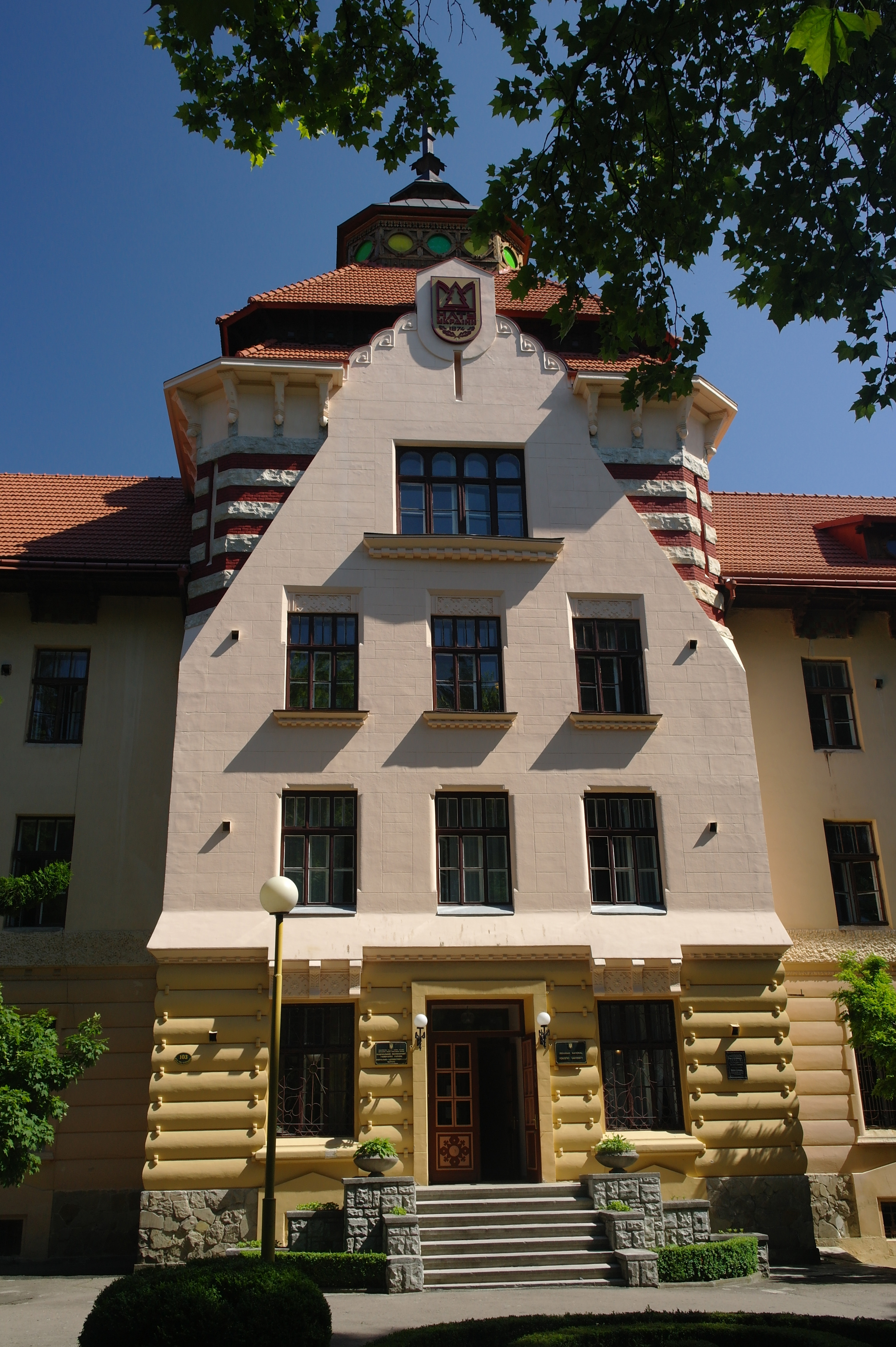
Ukrainian National Forestry University, 1909

=== Yekaterinoslav ===
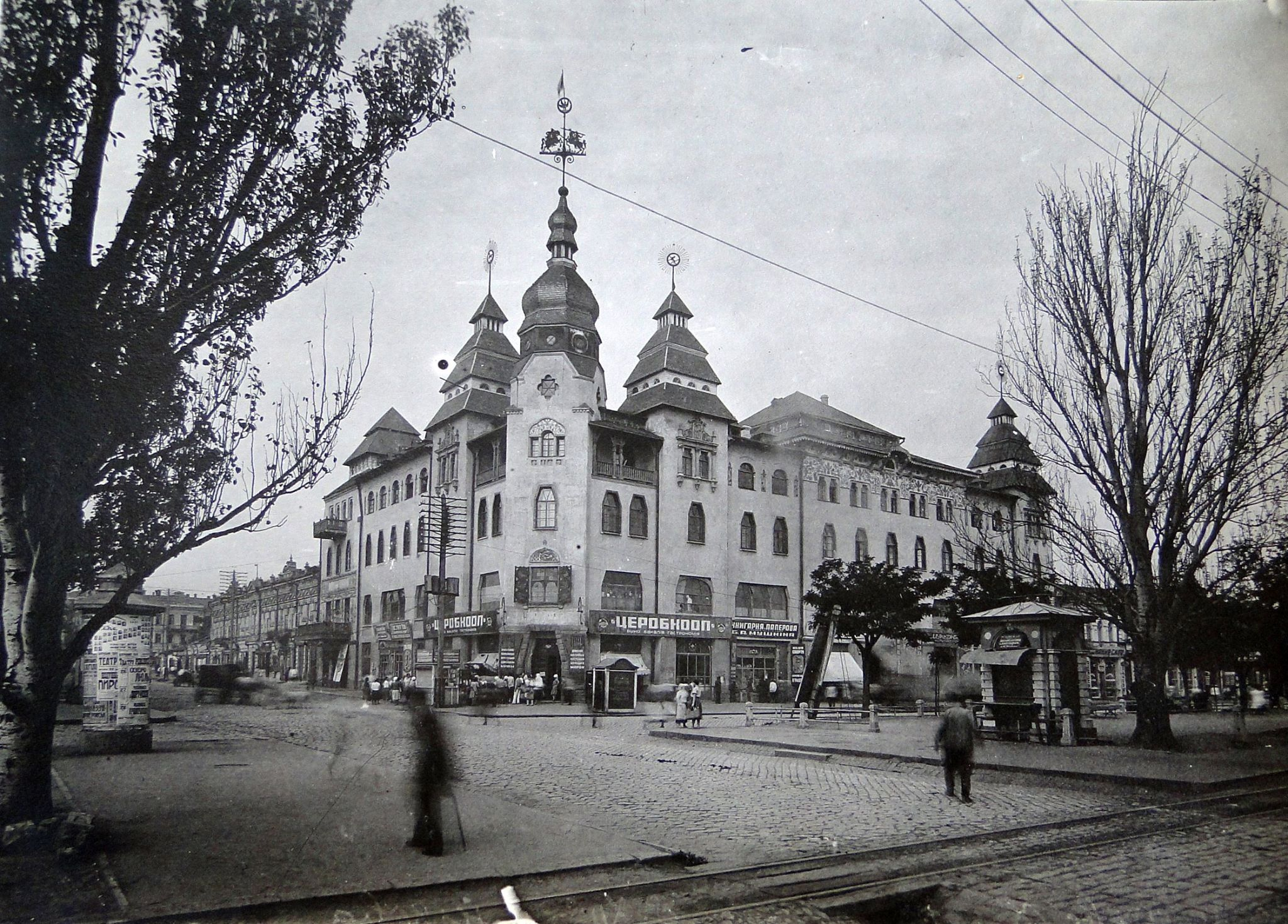
Original view of Khrennikov House in Dnipro

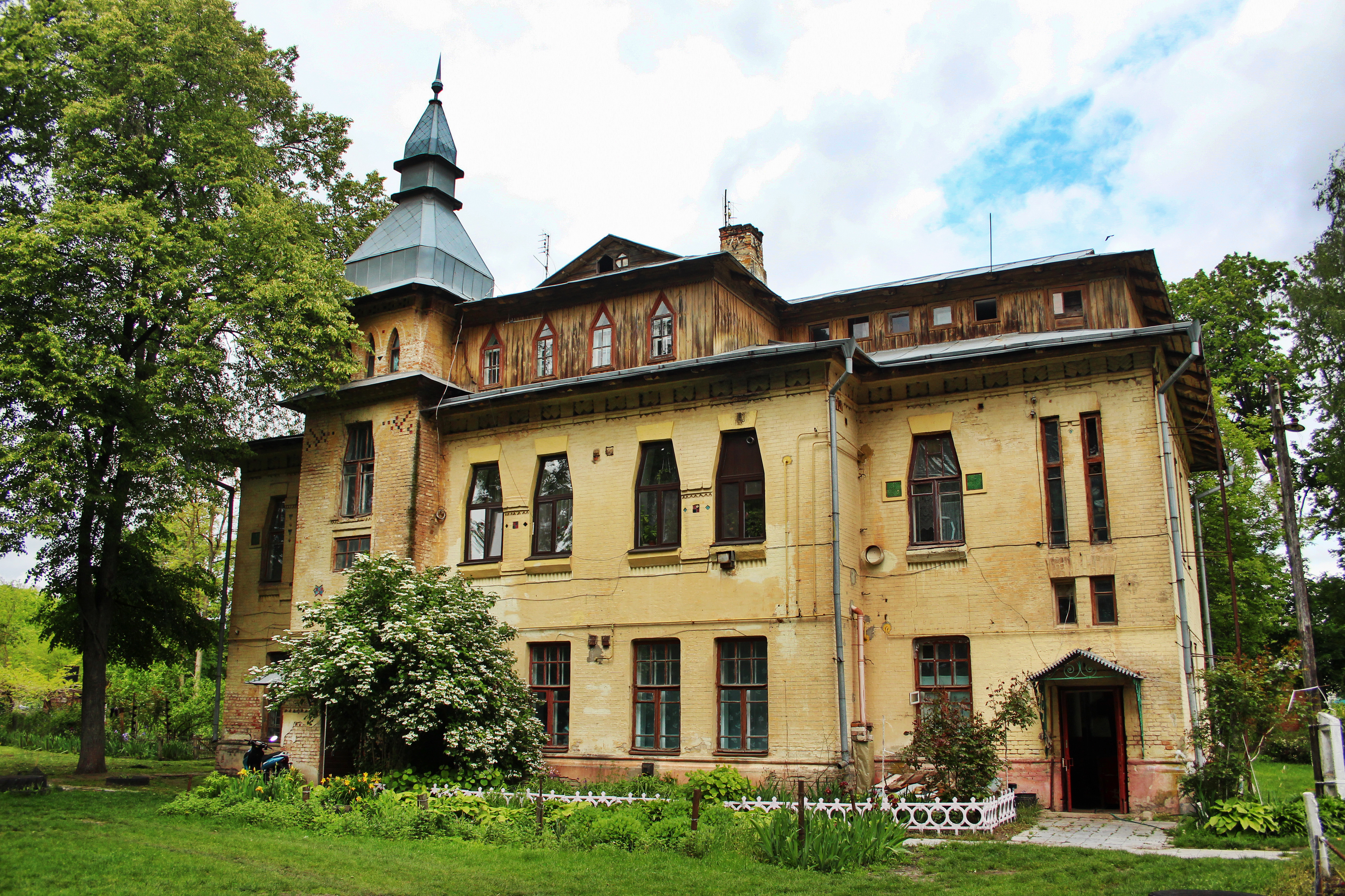
Agricultural station in Doslidne, Nosivka urban hromada

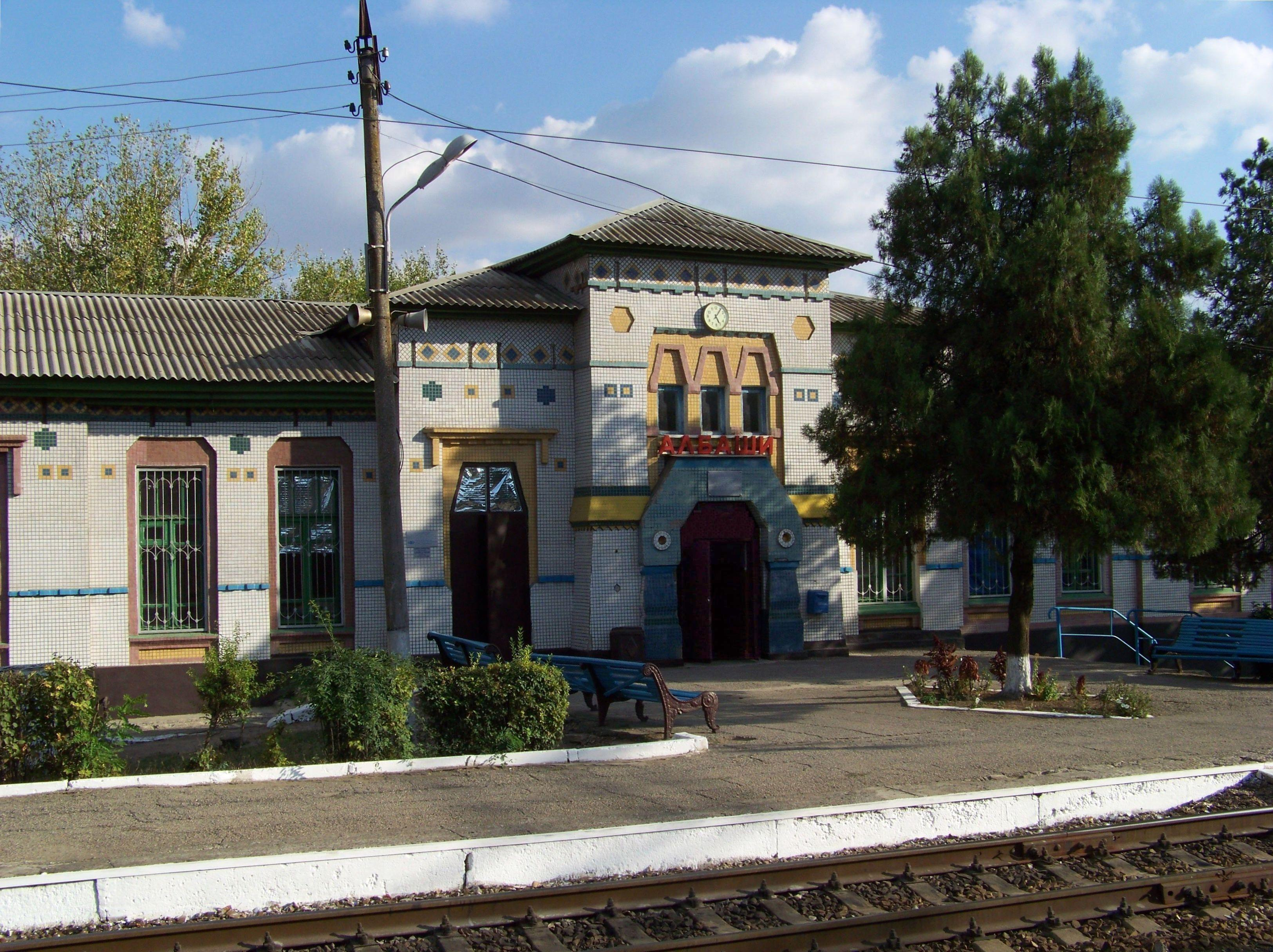
Albashy railway station

Separate buildings in the UAM style were also built in Yekaterinoslav (now Dnipro).

The first such building is the house at 22 Kavaleriiska Street (1908), by design of I. M. Truba. This two-story building had several residential apartments.

In the rural areas of the Yekaterinoslav Governorate, one of the first houses built in folk-style architecture is the Prosvita House in the village of Manuilivka (1909, designed by I. M. Truba).

Among the early 20th century Yekaterinoslav houses, the most notable landmark that incorporated folk motifs was the house of engineer V. M. Khrennikov. Khrennikov House immediately became one of the city's outstanding buildings; before it was even finished, in early 1913 it was included in the "City Landmarks" section of the book "All of Yekaterinoslav" (1913, p. 126).

=== Other regions of Ukraine ===
- In Odessa, the residential complex at 3 Pyrohivska Street was built in the UAM style (1911–1916, architect Yakiv Ponomarenko). The six buildings of the complex form an ensemble, making this the first Ukrainian Noveau residential complex.
- In Uman, a gymnasium at 25 Malofontanna Street was built in the beginning of 20th century with characteristic features of Ukrainian Nouveau.
- In Tulchyn, a house by the architest M. I. Shpandel and engineer Hrozdovsky, built in 1927, at Mykola Leontovycha Street 51.
- In Chernihiv and Chernihiv Oblast, multiple houses, especially schools, were built in the UAM style. One example is the building of the city library.
- In Dunaivtsi, the Krasiński Palace was built in a similar style in the beginning of 20th century.
- In Ivano-Frankivsk the style of Ukrainian Art Nouveau/Hutsul Secession is represented by the building of the Basilian Sisters' Monastery constructed in 1910-1913 by Ivan Levynskyi and Oleksandr Lushpynskyi.

=== Kuban ===
In Kuban, most railway stations of the Kuban–Black Sea railway were built in the Ukrainian Nouveau style (Albashy, Vedmidivka, Myshastovka, Titarovka, etc.), including numerous adjacent buildings, such as the workers' residential houses and schools (1910–1916).

== Later development ==
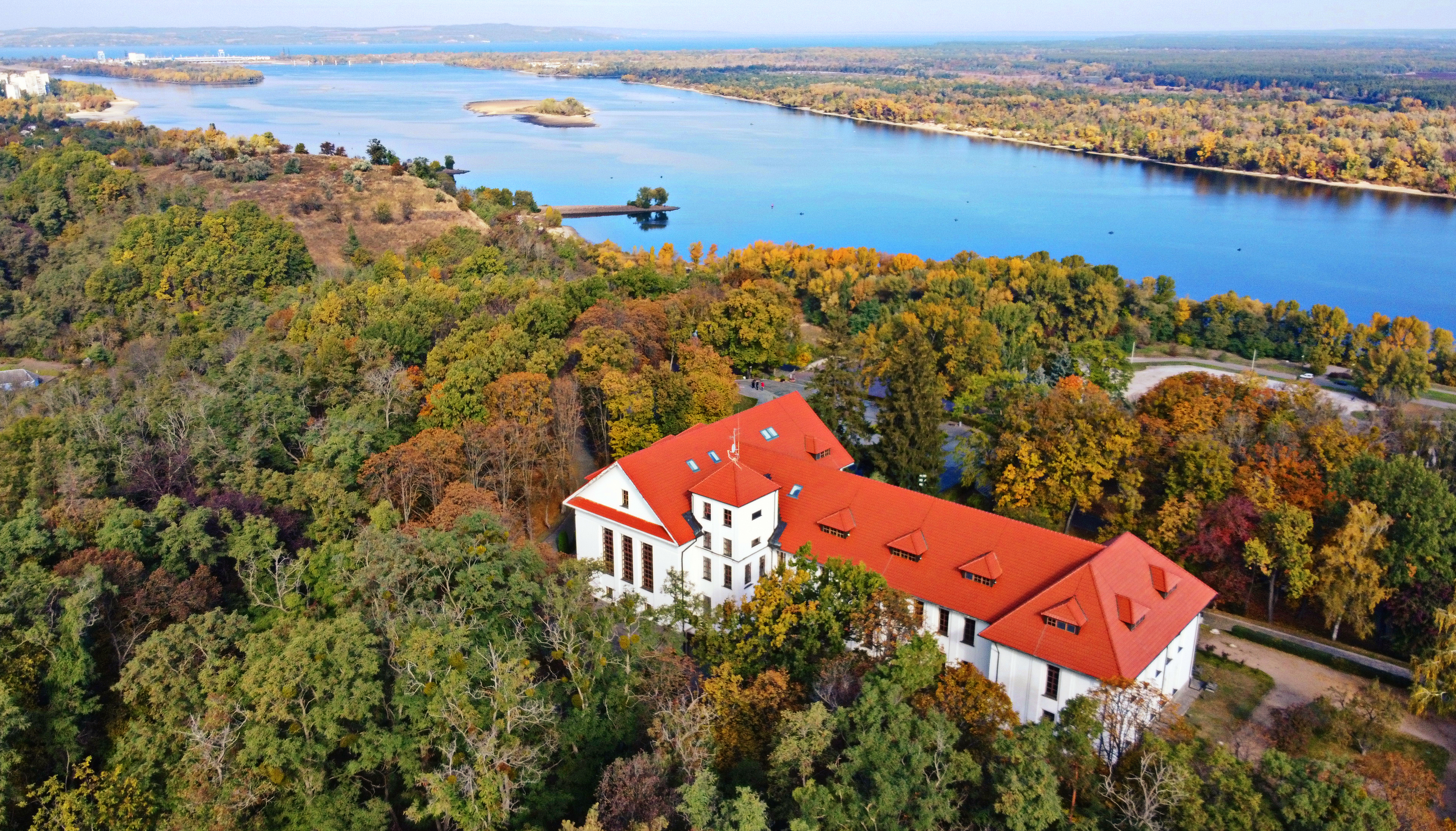
Taras Shevchenko Memorial museum in Kaniv (1939)

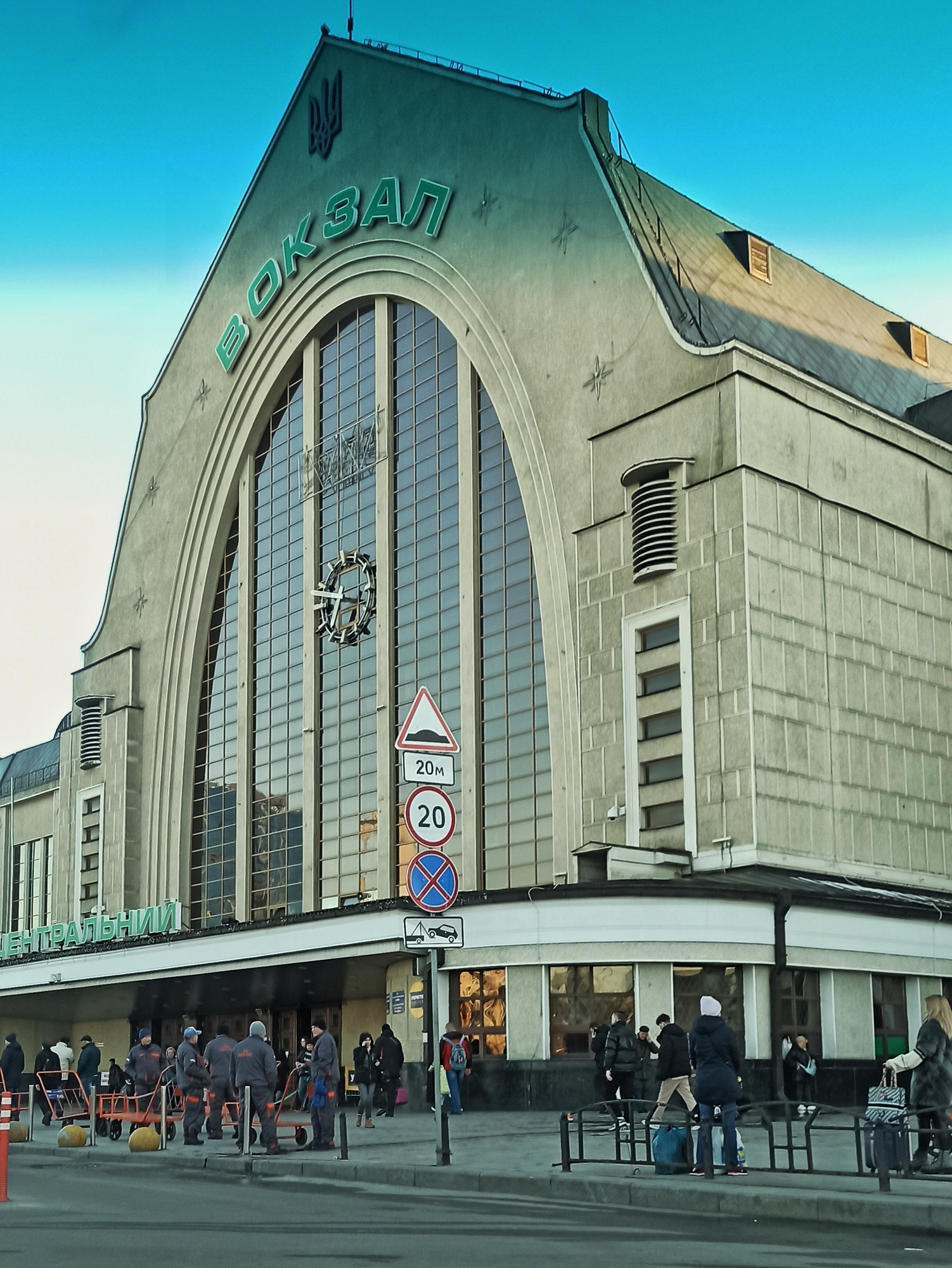
Main terminal of Kyiv Railway Station

Among examples of Ukrainian Art Nouveau architecture built during the Soviet times is the building of the Forest Engineering Institute in Holosiiv near Kyiv, constructed during the late 1920s. Inspired by forms of the Ukrainian Baroque, the structure's architect Dmytro Diachenko was severely criticized by Soviet authorities and accused of "nationalism", which eventually led to his imprisonment and death in the Gulag.

Nevertheless, construction of buildings in that style continued into the 1940s. For instance, elements of Ukrainian Modern are present in Viktor Estrovich's building in Kharkiv, as well as in trade pavilions designed by Yevhen Nakonechny and in interior designs of the Verkhovna Rada building. The building of Taras Shevchenko Memorial Museum designed by Vasyl Krychevsky and Petro Kostyrko also includes Ukrainian Art Nouveau features. An example of the "rationalist" direction of Ukrainian Art Nouveau is the building of Kyiv Railway Station erected in 1928-1932 according to a project by Oleksandr Verbytsky.

After World War II elements of Ukrainian traditional architecture were employed by a number of architects both in Ukraine and in the diaspora. A prominent example of Ukrainian Art Nouveau from that period is the building of Ukraine Hotel in Luhansk (1947-1952) designed by Yosyf Karakis.

Throughout its history, Ukrainian Art Nouveau spread far beyond the borders of Ukraine. For example, Krychevskyi's design employed in the building of Poltava zemstvo influenced the construction of the People's House erected by the Ukrainian community in Harbin, China.

Elements of Ukrainian Art Nouveau are present in some examples of modern Ukrainian architecture, for example in railway booths erected on some crossings during the ministry of Heorhiy Kirpa, or in the silhouette of Kyiv's Arena City complex.

== Legacy ==
Over the years of the development of Ukrainian Nouveau, more than 500 objects were built in this style. The heritage of the UAM has been preserved incompletely. Much was destroyed during the World War I, Ukrainian–Soviet War, Polish–Ukrainian War, and World War II. The attitude of the Soviet authorities played a large role in the insufficient preservation of the UAM objects, during which many of the buildings were either destroyed or subjected to improper restoration. The names of many architects who worked in the UAM style were banned in Soviet times. During decades of artificial oblivion, the work and fate of these architects were unknown even to specialists. In the 1970s, some architectural historians and local historians, on their own initiative and without publicity, began a search and study of monuments, the work of significant masters, unnoticed by the authorities at that time, even trying to rise to certain generalizations, publishing their works when possible—from district newspapers to collections of abstracts of scientific conferences in regional centers. More productive study of the UAM began only in 1990. One of the most famous researchers of the UAM is Viktor Chepelyk.

== Literature ==
- Чепелик В. В. Український архітектурний модерн. / Упорядник З. В. Мойсеєнко-Чепелик. — К. : КНУБА, 2000.
- Бібліографія з Українського архітектурного модерну у книзі Чепелик В. В. Український архітектурний модерн. / Упорядник З. В. Мойсеєнко-Чепелик. — К. : КНУБА, 2000.
- Олена Щербань Український модерн в архітектурно-будівельній кераміці Опішнянського гончарного навчально-показового пункту Полтавського губернського земства (1912–1924 рр.) (укр.)
