= Zdzisław Charmański =

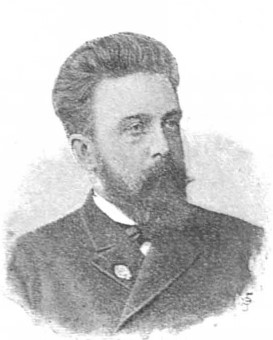
- Born: August 15, 1859; Yekaterinoslav, Russia
- Died: 6 August 1925 (aged 65); Vilnius, Poland
- Education: Institute of Civil Engineers
- Known for: Architecture
- Notable work: Kharkiv Hippodrome (1914); Church of St. Nicholas in Kamianske

Marian Józef Zdzisław Charmański (born August 15, 1859, in Yekaterinoslav, died August 6, 1925, in Vilnius) was a Polish architect, primarily active in Kharkiv.

He was the author of, among others, the Hippodrome in Kharkiv and the Catholic Church of St. Nicholas in Kamianske. His father was Edward Charmański, and his brother was Stanisław Antoni Charmański, both distinguished architects who made significant contributions to Yekaterinoslav.

== Biography ==
He was born in Yekaterinoslav into the family of the Polish architect Edward Julian Charmański, originally from the Vilnius Region, who was employed there as the city architect. Zdzisław Charmański received his initial education in Yekaterinoslav and later in Kremenchuk. Zdzisław's younger brother was Stanisław Antoni, head of the construction department in Yekaterinoslav, who died there in 1917. The youngest brother, Anatol, was a lawyer.

As a graduate of the St. Petersburg Institute of Civil Engineers, he initially worked for the Ministry of War. He was assigned to Novocherkassk, where he served as a junior engineer from September 15, 1885, and as a senior engineer in the construction department from January 1889. In Novocherkassk, he built the Ataman Technical High School, an equine hospital, a stable for artillery horses, and a kitchen for soldiers. He also built several religious structures.

In 1890 he was transferred to Kharkiv. There he initially held the position of junior engineer at the Kharkiv gubernatorial administration. Then, between 1895 and 1917, he worked as the gubernatorial engineer for Kharkiv's zemstvo agriculture. He also became a member of the Russian Technical Society. In 1906, he served on the city duma, and for the next three terms, he was a deputy of the municipal administration. He was employed at the newly opened Kharkov Practical Technological Institute of Emperor Alexander III as a lecturer, where from 1911 to 1918, he taught architectural drawing.

He was the author of many monumental projects in the city and was also an activist within the Polish diaspora, co-founding the organization "Polski Dom" (Polish House).

In 1919, after Poland regained independence, he moved to Warsaw. In 1922 he became the director of the Technical School in Vilnius, where he resided at 11 Rzeczna Street (now Raseinių street). He was also a member of the Association of Polish Engineers. Charmański died in Vilnius on August 6, 1925, and was buried at the Rasos Cemetery.

== Bibliography ==
- Zhvanko, Liubov (2018). "Polscy architekci Charkowa – Bolesław Michałowski i Marian Józef Zdzisław Charmański: szkic o życiu i twórczości" [Polish Architects of Kharkiv – Bolesław Michałowski and Marian Józef Zdzisław Charmański: A Sketch of Their Life and Work]. Studia z Architektury Nowoczesnej. 6.
