= Boiko House =

Coordinates: 50°00′22″N 36°14′20″E

Ivan Boiko House
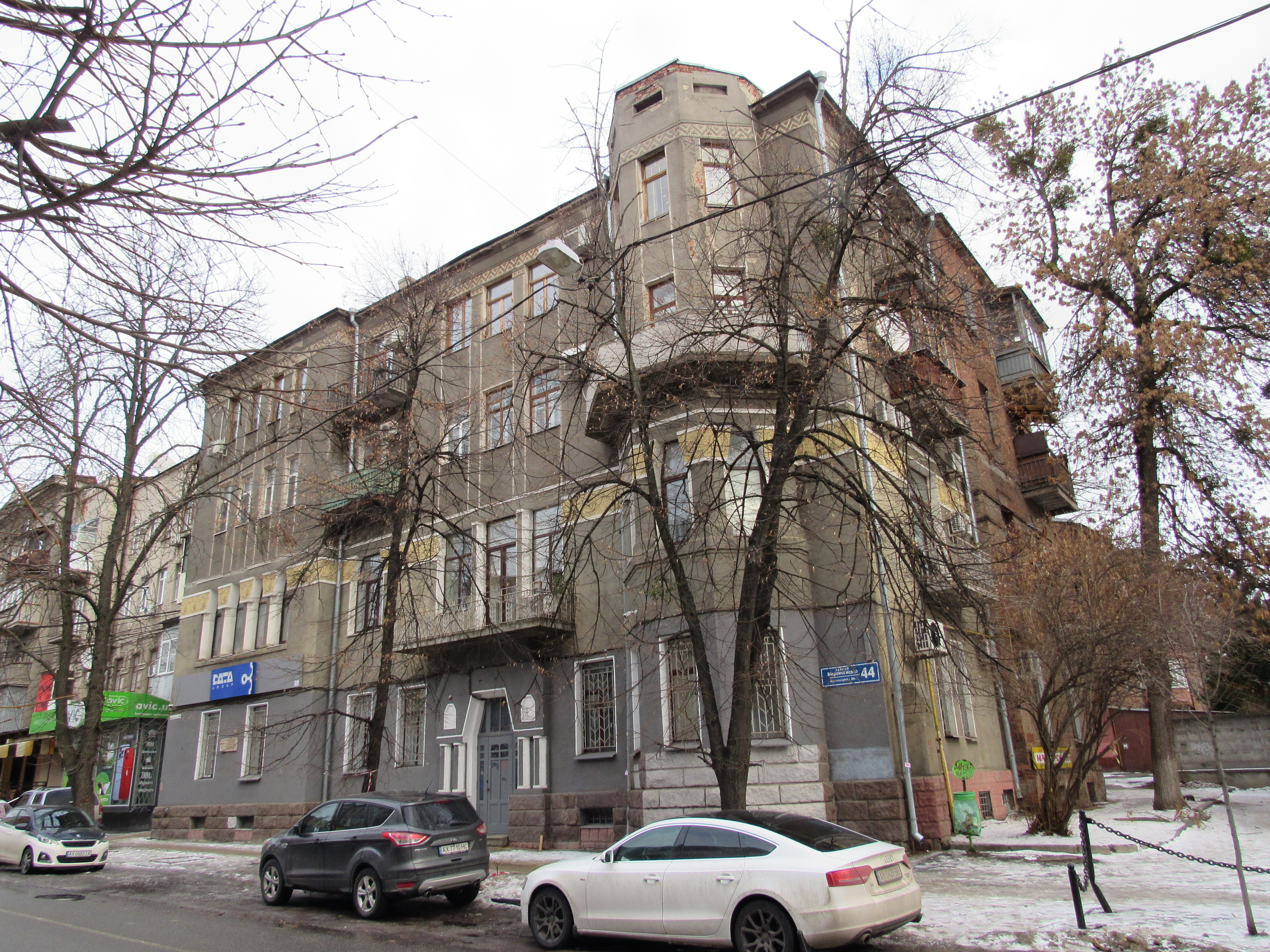
- Interactive map of Ivan Boiko House
- Location: Ukraine, Kharkiv, Myronosytska Street, 44
- Designer: Serhii Tymoshenko, Pavlo Shyrshov, and Pavlo Sokolov
- Type: revenue house
- Material: brick
- Height: 2 floors (original); 4 floors (after reconstruction)
- Beginning date: 1912
- Completion date: 1914
- Restored date: 1930s – superstructure

Immovable Monument of Local Significance of Ukraine
- Official name: «Жилий будинок» (Residential building)
- Type: Urban Planning, Architecture
- Reference no.: 7217-Ха

The Ivan Boiko House (Ukrainian: Будинок Івана Бойка) is an architectural and urban planning monument in the Ukrainian Art Nouveau style, located in the center of Kharkiv at 44 Myronosytska Street. The building was constructed between 1912 and 1914 as a revenue house (apartment building for rent) based on a design by architects Serhii Tymoshenko, Pavlo Shyrshov, and Pavlo Sokolov. Renowned artists Mykola Samokysh and Serhii Vasylkivsky decorated the stairwells with murals and panels.

== History ==
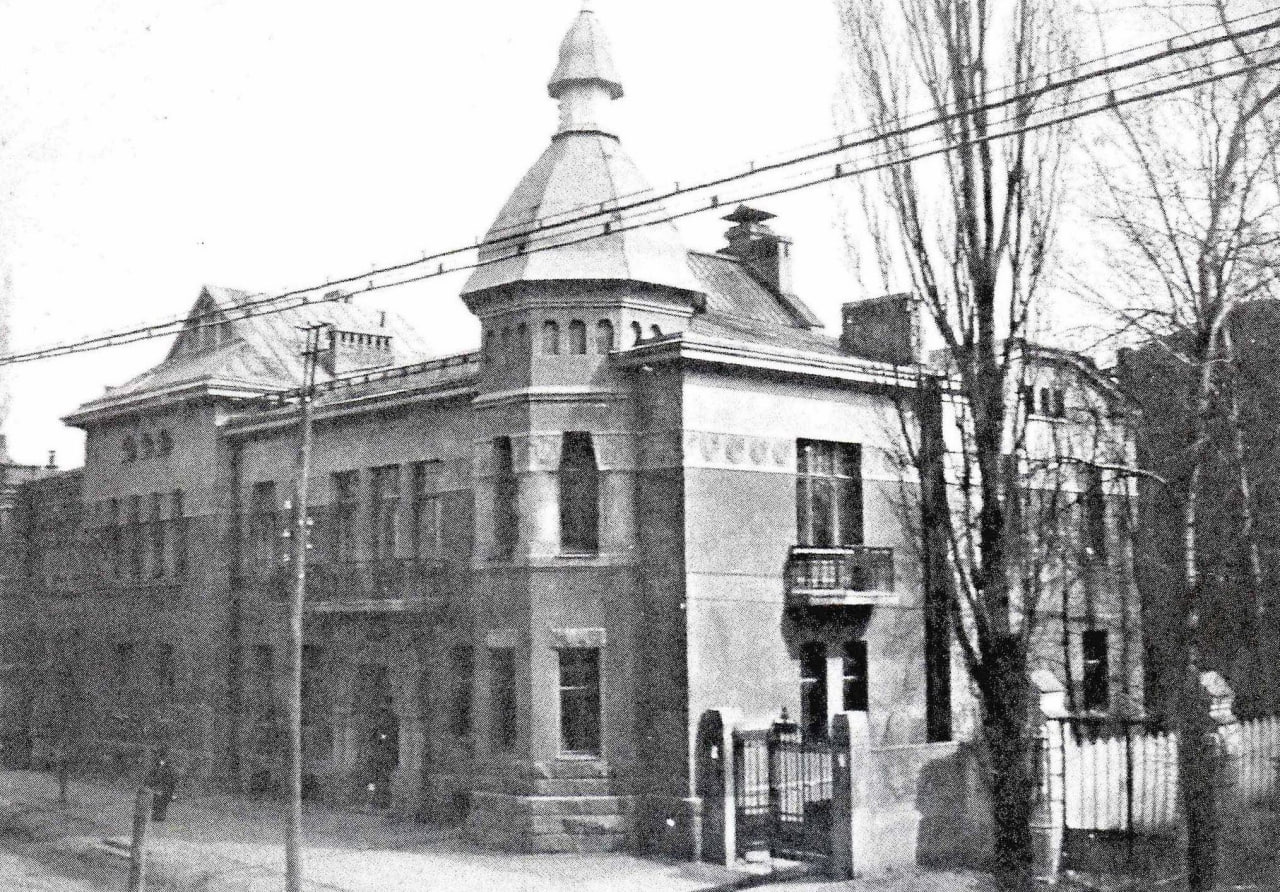
Building before reconstruction. 1910s

The house was built between 1912 and 1914 as a rental apartment building, designed by architects Serhii Tymoshenko, Pavlo Shyrshov, and Pavlo Sokolov. The building's owner was Ivan Boiko, a landowner associated with the prominent sugar magnate Pavlo Kharitonenko. As a trusted associate and art collector, Boiko had personal connections with leading artists of the time, which explains the participation of Samokysh and Vasylkivsky in the building's artistic decoration.

Originally, the structure was two stories high, with three apartments on each floor and a semi-basement. Its architectural features combine traditional elements of the Ukrainian national style: trapezoidal windows and cornices, a pitched roof with "bends" characteristic of vernacular architecture, and a tower with a dome reminiscent of the wooden churches of the Sloboda region. The main entrance was adorned with a hexagonal portal flanked by half-columns and ornamental patterns in the same shape. The vestibule and staircases featured decorative paintings in the Ukrainian style. Notable artists worked on the interior: Mykola Samokysh created floral and ornamental compositions, while Serhii Vasylkivsky painted a monumental panel – presumably a version of Cossack Meadow — and a portrait of Taras Shevchenko. Both artworks were destroyed during the Soviet period.

The architect Serhii Tymoshenko lived in the building from its completion until 1919. He is regarded as one of the founders of Ukrainian Art Nouveau. In 2018, a memorial plaque honoring the architect was installed on the building. The plaque was created by sculptor Oleksandr Ridnyi.

In the 1920s, following the Bolshevik takeover of Kharkiv, the building was nationalized. In the 1930s, it was extended by two additional floors, according to a design by an unknown architect. As a result, the original roof, attic, facade articulation, roof lantern, and corner tower were completely destroyed. There were partial attempts to preserve the overall silhouette of the building by extending the form of the tower and continuing the ornamental cornice, but the general stylistic integrity of the structure suffered greatly. The house was transferred to the jurisdiction of the NKVD and converted into a multi-apartment residential building. The roof lantern in the stairwell was dismantled. The monumental murals were painted over, and Vasylkivskyi's panel was destroyed. However, parts of Samokysh's frescoes survived beneath layers of whitewash.

In the 2000s, researchers from the Kharkiv State Academy of Design and Arts undertook efforts to restore the murals. Using microscopic analysis, ultraviolet light, and chemical methods, they managed to recover several fragments of the wall paintings. However, due to a lack of funding, most of the restoration work remained incomplete. The building's entrance still features partially restored decorative elements by Mykola Samokysh – the only surviving monumental work by the artist.

In 2022, the building sustained damage from Russian missile strikes. Portions of the glazing were lost, and facade elements were damaged.

The structure is listed as a monument of local architectural and urban significance, with protection number 7217-Ха.

== Gallery ==
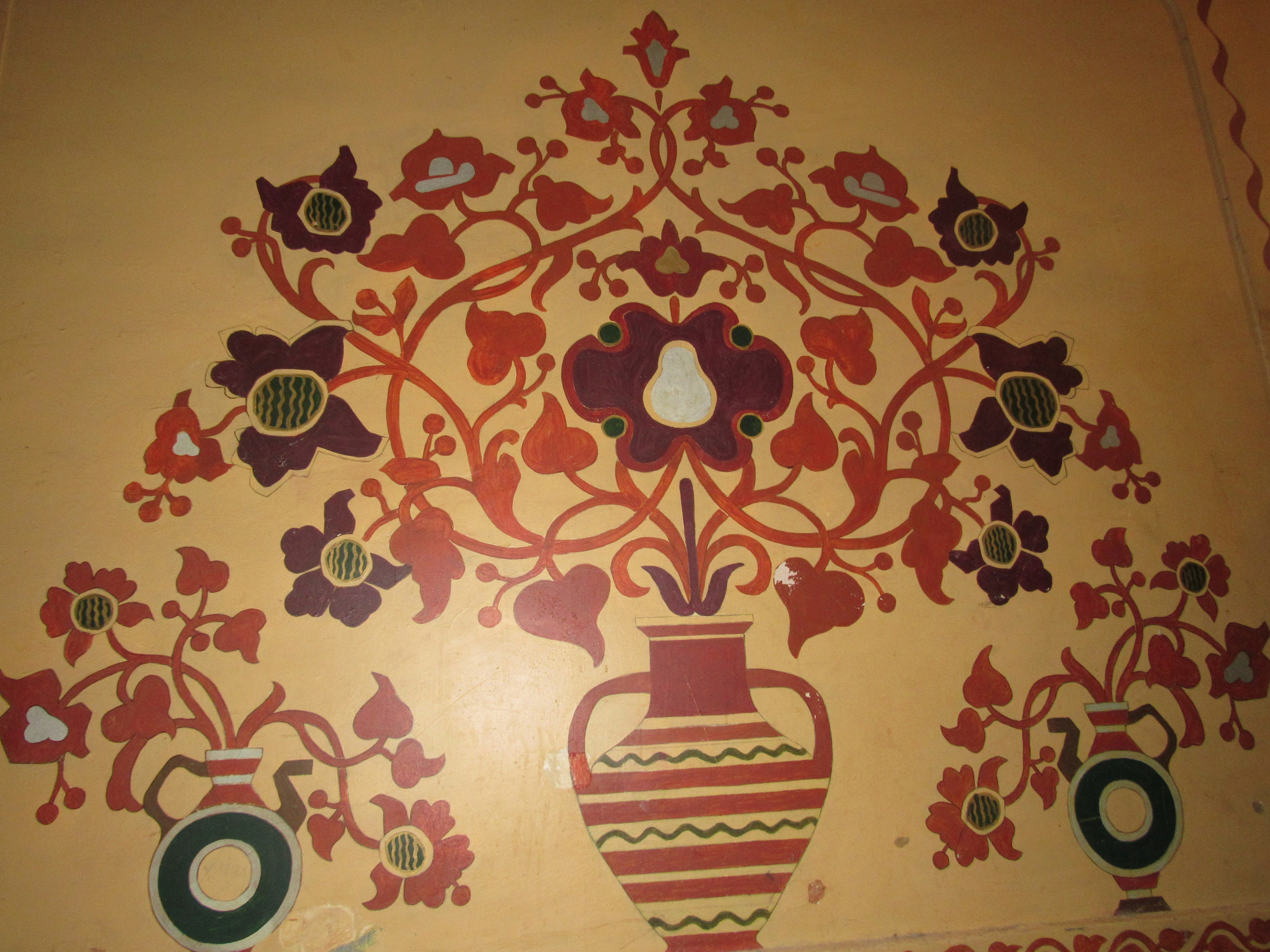
Samokish murals

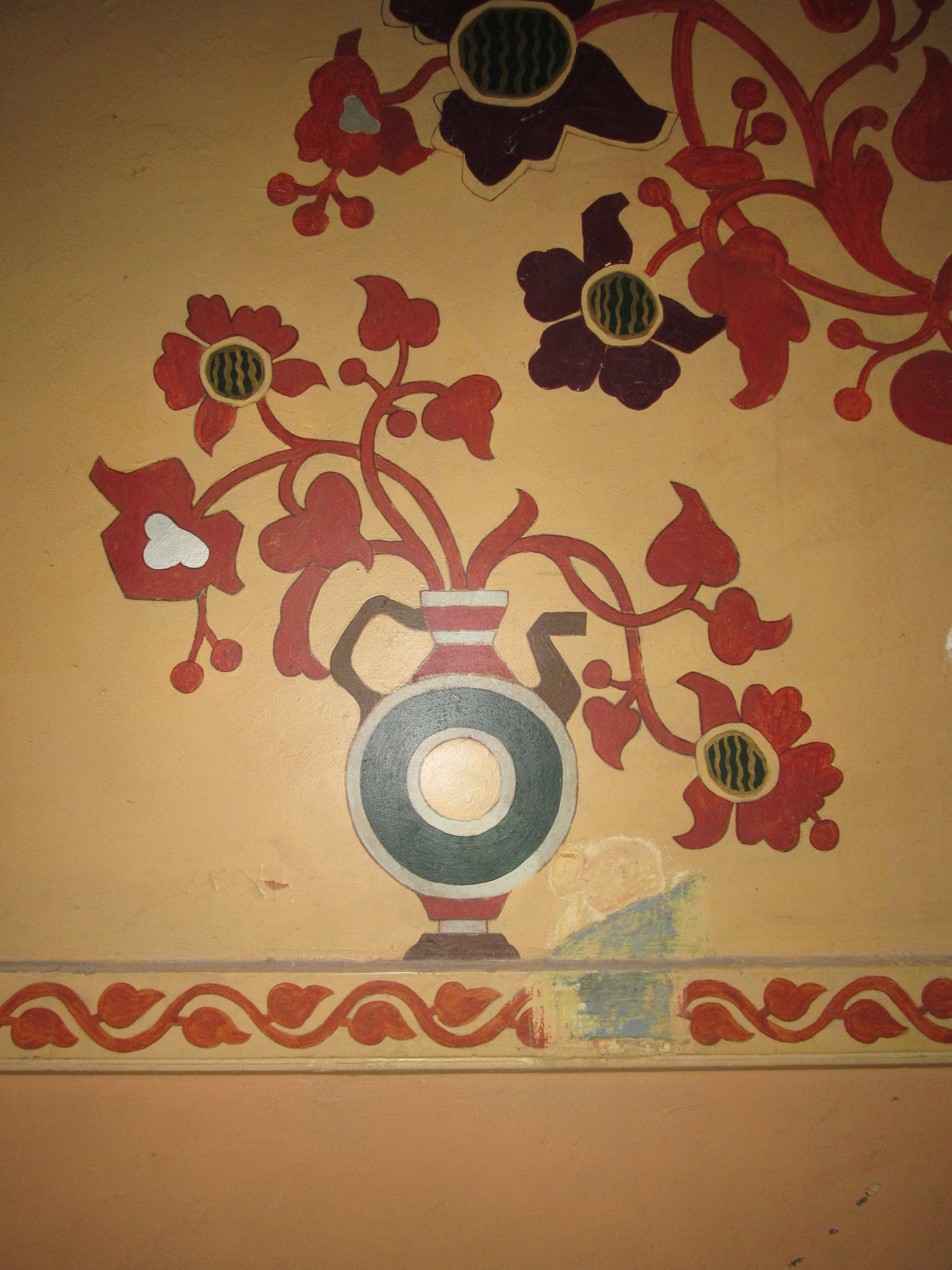
Murals

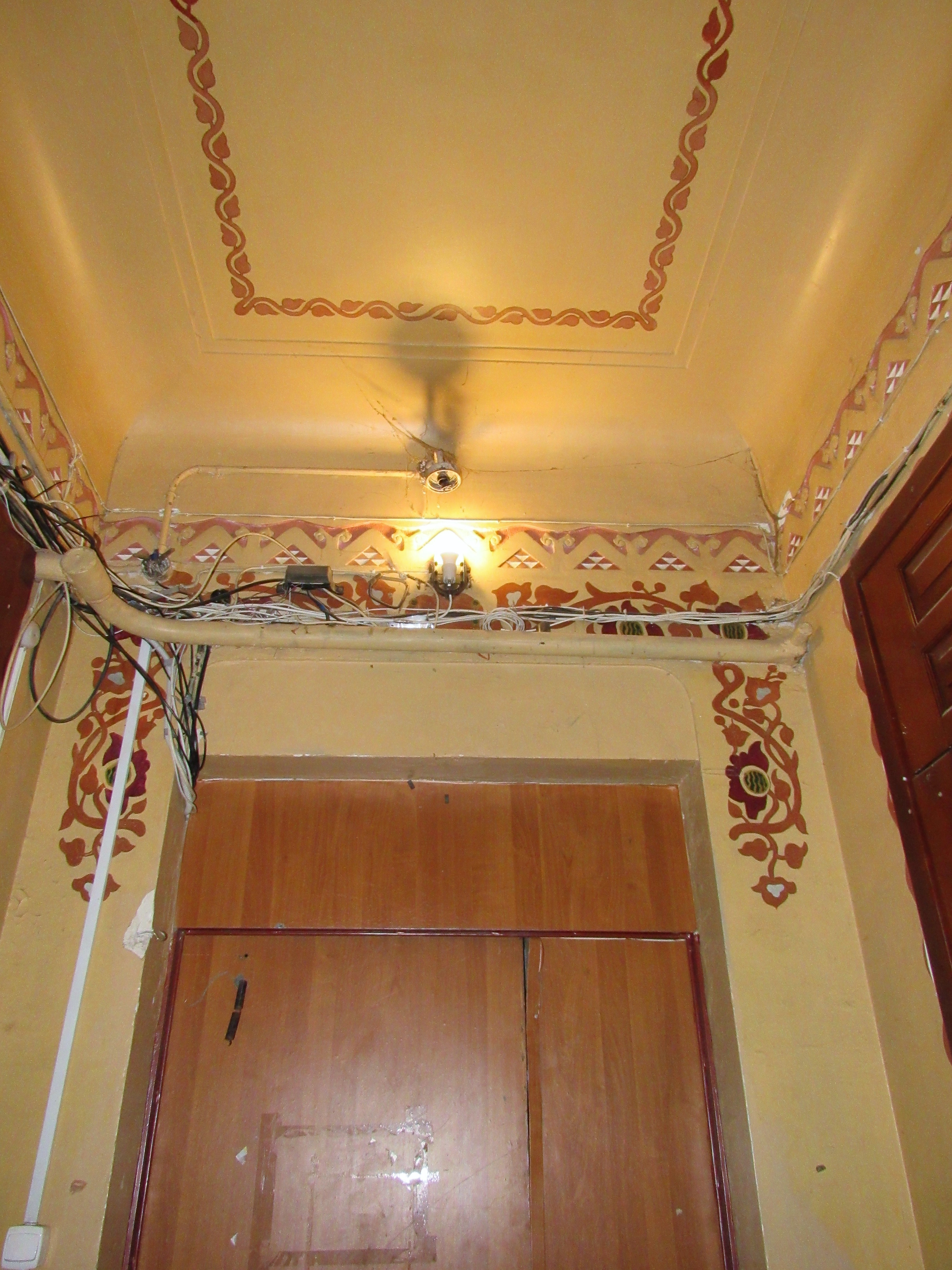
Murals above the entrance to the porch

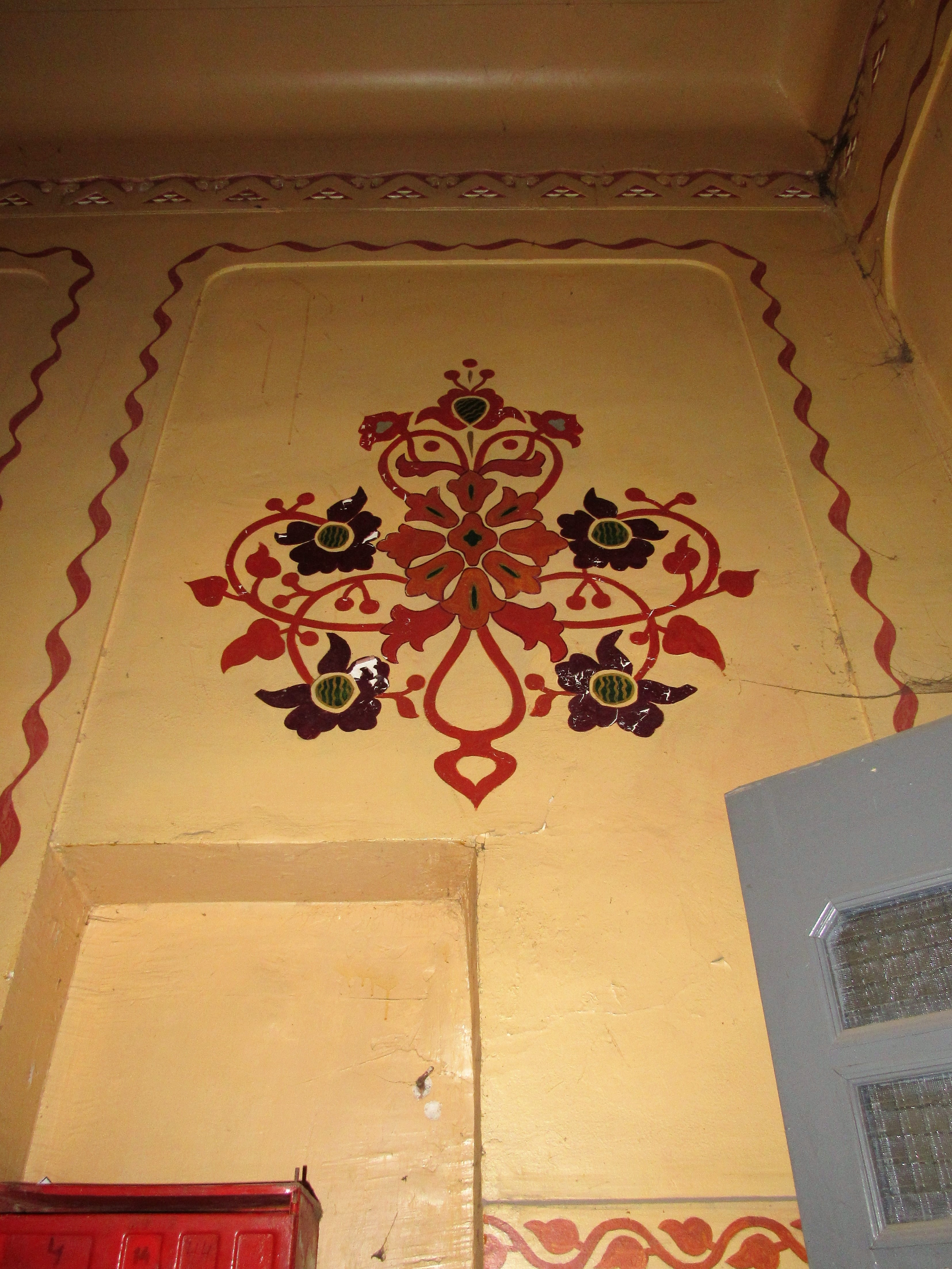
Murals

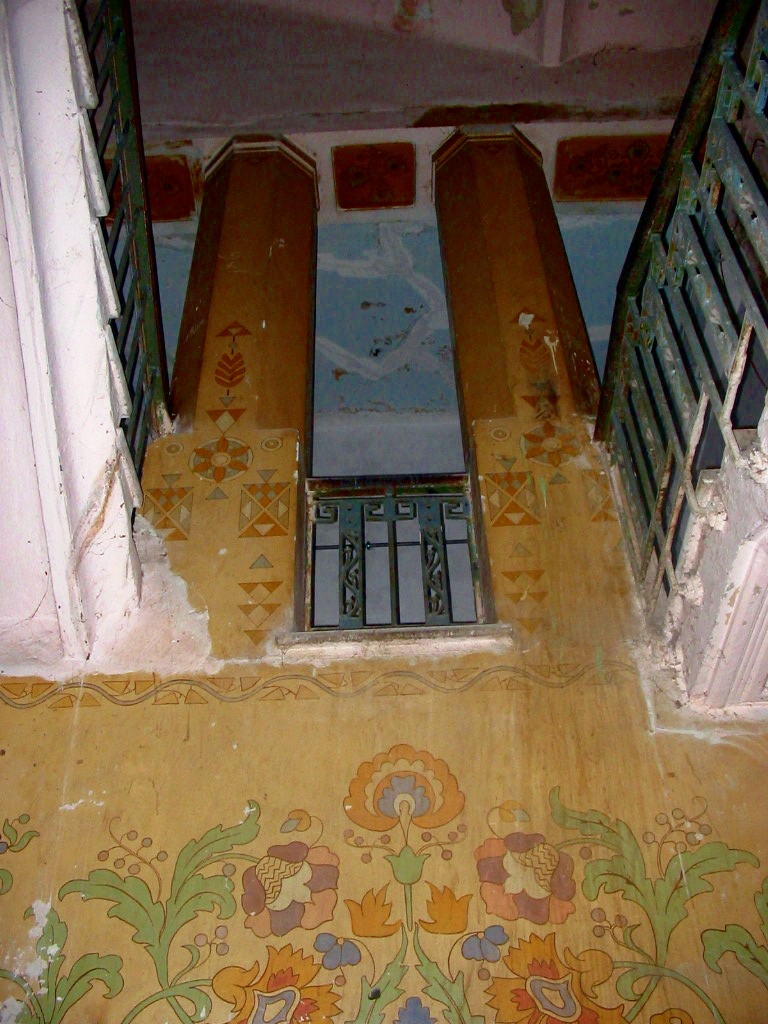
Entrance paintings

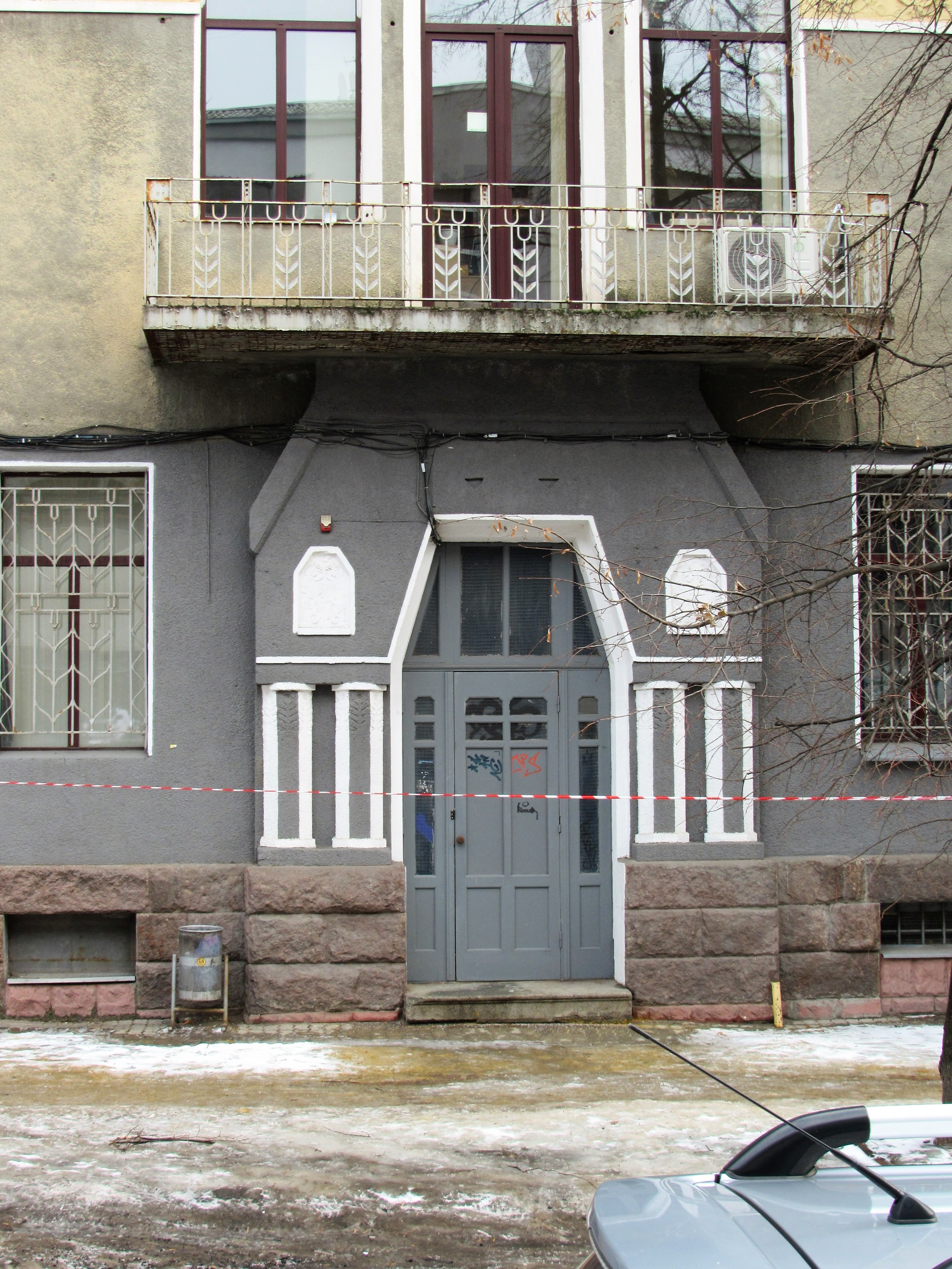
Input group

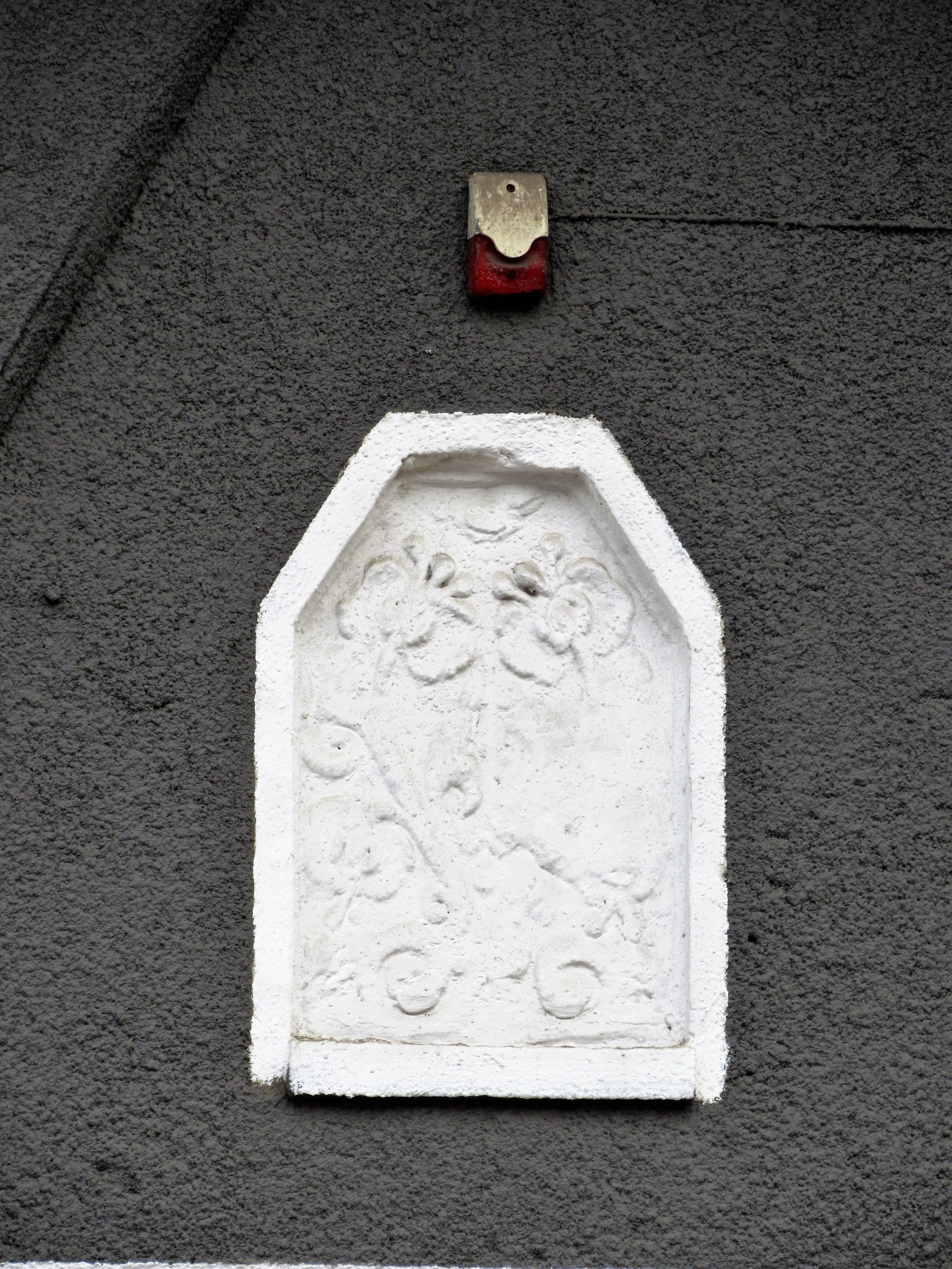
Input group detail

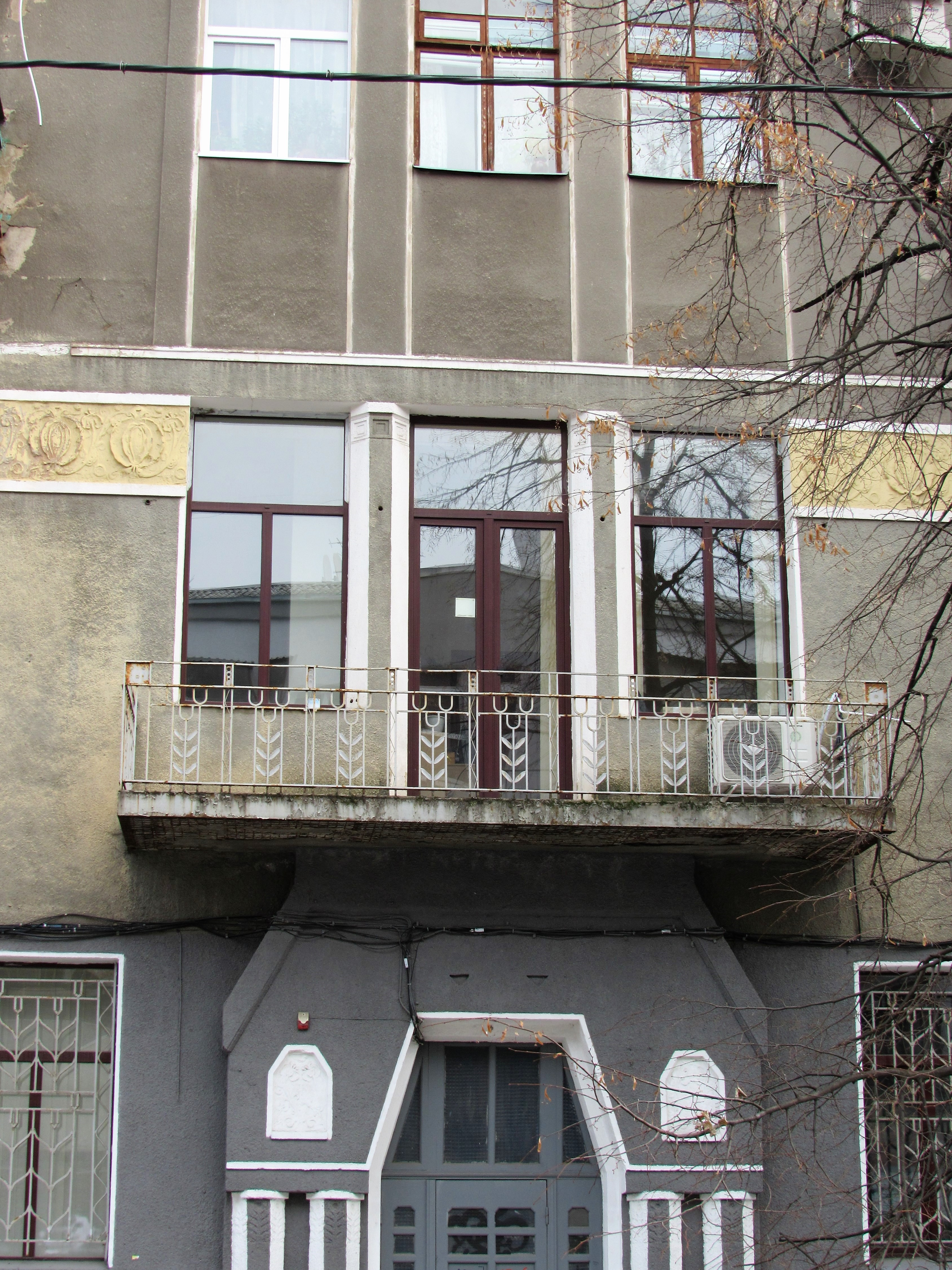
Original second floor balcony

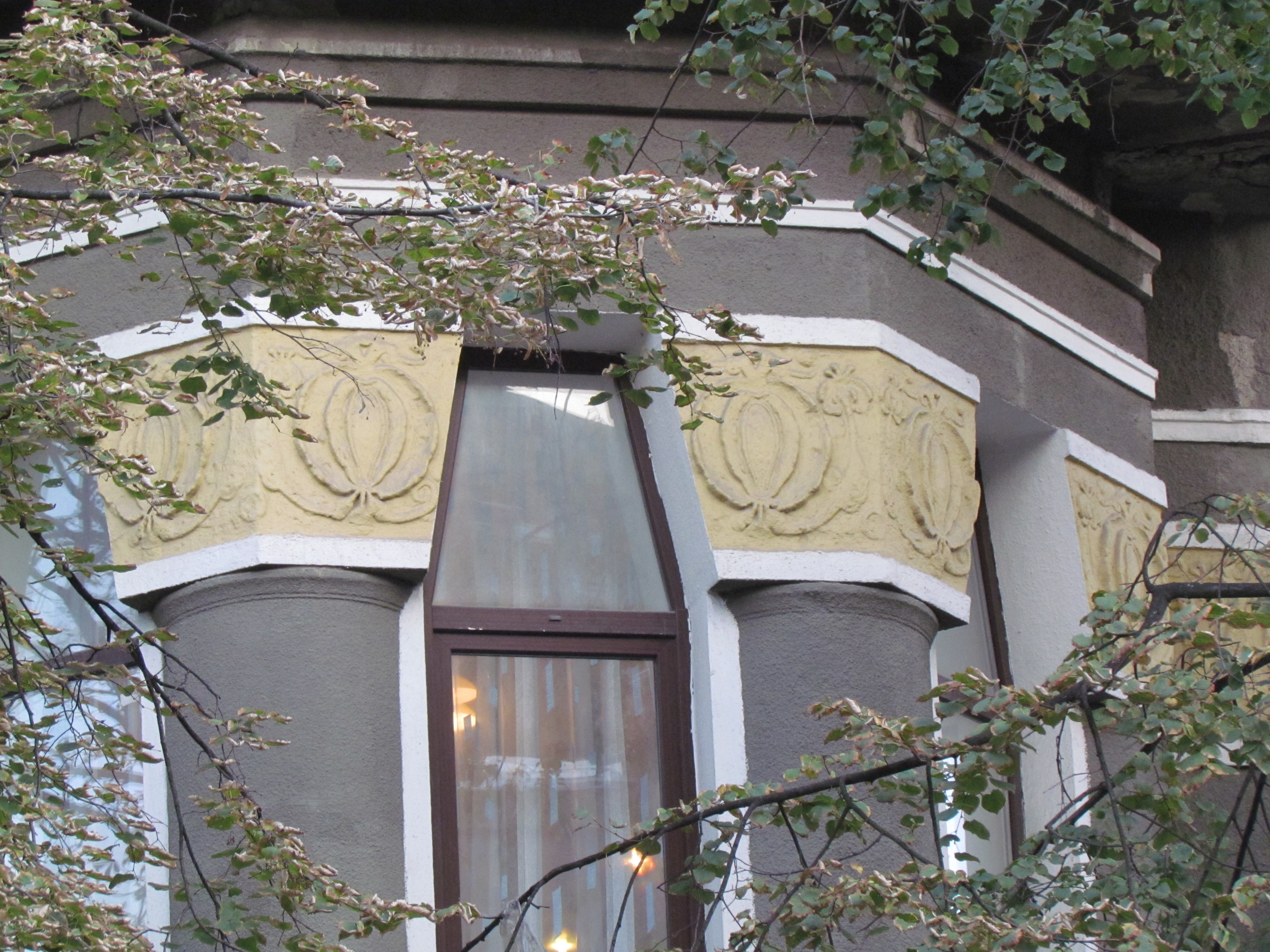
Original ornament

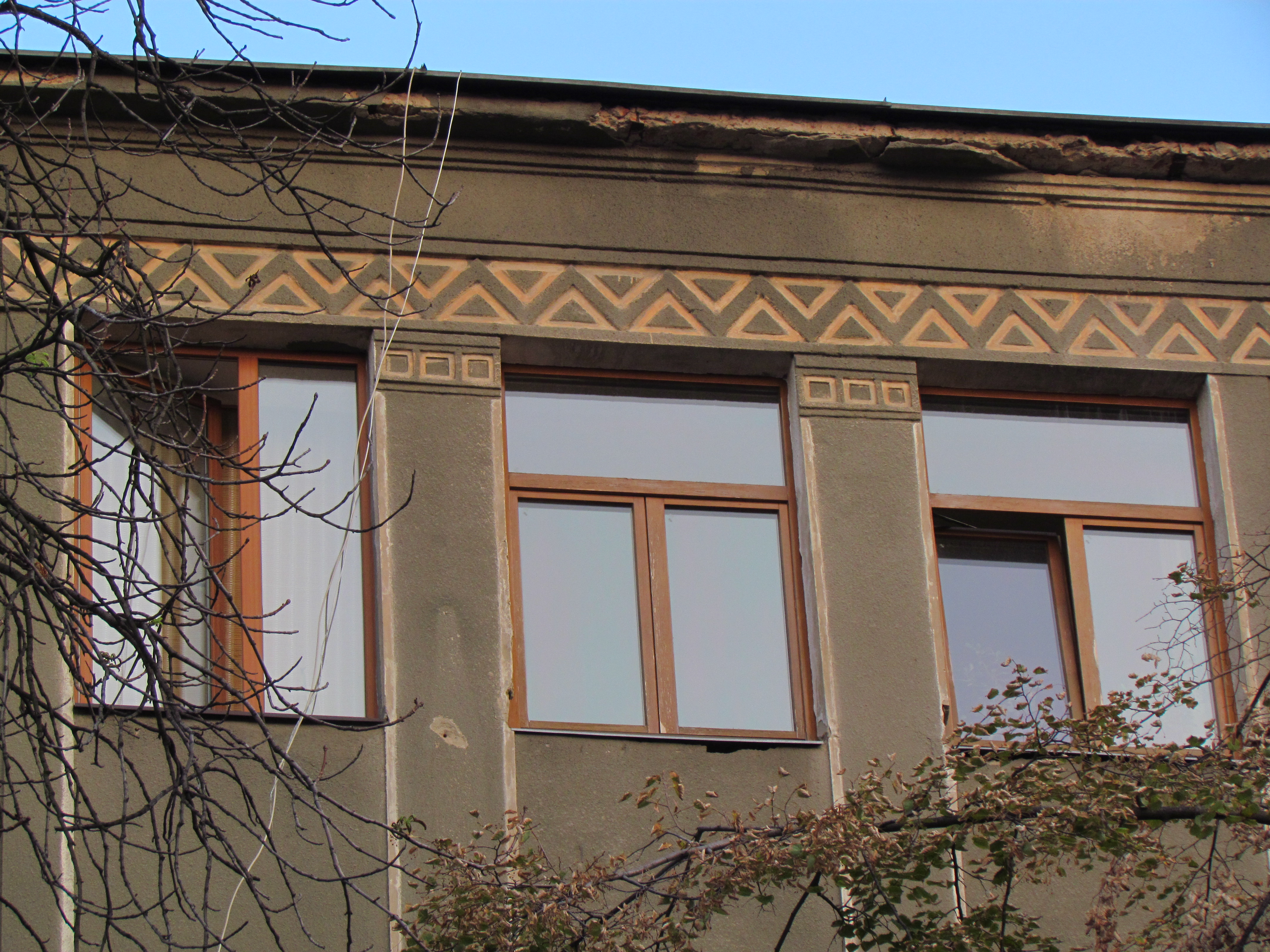
1930s superstructure ornament
