= Myronosytska Street =

Street in Kharkiv, Ukraine

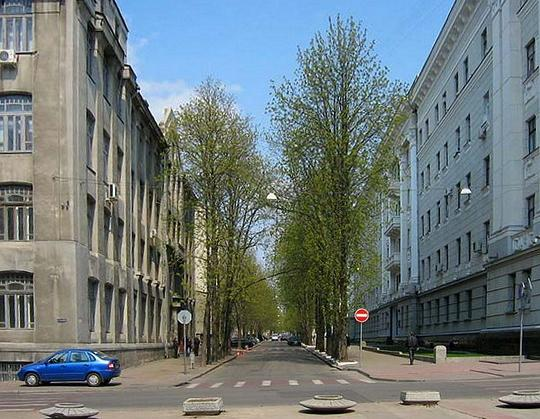
- The beginning of the street
- Interactive map of Myronosytska Street
- Native name: Ukrainian: Мироносицька вулиця, lit. 'the one who brings peace'
- Former name(s): Snarskyi lane, Malo-Sumska street, Novo-Malo-Sumska street, Myronosytska Street, Rivnoty ta Braterstva Street, Dzerzhynsky Street
- Type: street

Myronosytska Street (Ukrainian: Мироносицька вулиця, lit. 'the one who brings peace') is one of the central streets of Kharkiv, located between Sumska Street and Hryhorii Skovoroda Street. It begins at Zhony-Myronosytsi Street and continues the direction of Hohol Street, extending to the Ipodrom Square. The street derives its name from the Myronosytska Church, which was formerly situated on the now-defunct Myronosytskyi Square and was demolished in 1930.

== History ==
Myronosytska Street in Kharkiv takes its name from Myronosytska Square and the church that once stood there. The history of the area begins with the Myronosytske Cemetery, which partially remained in use until the 1830s. Later, a square was established in its place, where public festivities were held, particularly on the Day of the Myrrh-Bearing Women. Myronosytska Street quickly became one of the city's most prestigious streets, inhabited by generals, professors, large landowners, and merchants. Development occurred gradually, and by 1914 the street was nearly built up to its present extent.

At the end of the street, until 1945, stood a large water tower designed by engineer Vladimir Shukhov. Built in 1913, it was relocated to Poltava after World War II, where it was later dismantled for scrap metal in 2002. The water pumping station in Kharkiv still operates at the original site, and a small Art Nouveau–style building associated with the waterworks has also been preserved.

On October 9, 2009, a monument to Leonhard Leopoldovych Hirshman was unveiled next to the eye clinic. The monument, created by O. Demchenko and V. Semeniuk, depicts Dr. Hirshman with a blind girl who, thanks to his treatment, can see again. No longer in need of her cane, she has laid it down.

Myronosytska Street is also home to the Memorial Apartment Museum of the Hryzodubov family (building No. 54b), and in 1999, the first museum of sexual culture in Ukraine — the "Scientific and Educational Museum of Sexual Cultures of the World" — was opened at No. 81a.

The street suffered extensive damage from Russian shelling; several buildings were completely destroyed. Structures along the entire length of the street, including architectural landmarks, were severely damaged.

== Architectural landmarks ==
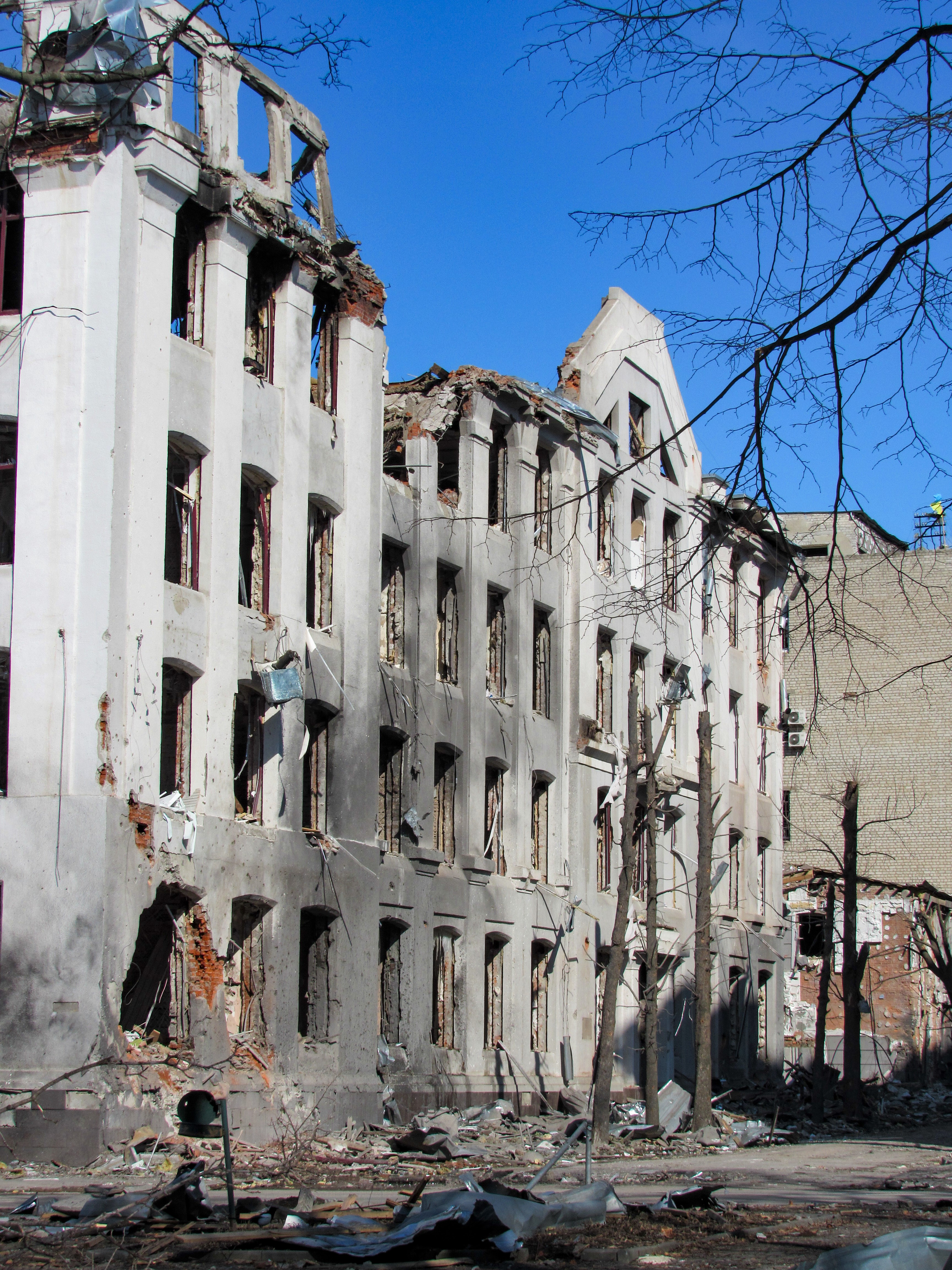
1 Myronosytska Street after the Russian missile hit

The building at 1 Myronosytska Street was constructed in 1925 for the People's Commissariat of Labor. Its monolithic reinforced concrete façades with brick infill elements loosely reflect motifs of traditional Ukrainian architecture. In 1934, after the Commissariat was relocated to Kyiv, the building housed the Kharkiv Regional Committee of the Communist Party of the Soviet Union, later the Regional Committee of the Komsomol, and subsequently the Faculty of Economics of V. N. Karazin Kharkiv National University. It was destroyed by a Russian missile strike on March 2, 2022.

Opposite this site stands a monumental five-story building. It was reconstructed from early 20 century structures between 1958 and 1962 to serve the Kharkiv Committee of State Security of the Ukrainian SSR. Today, it houses the Security Service of Ukraine.

At the corner of 11 Myronosytska Street and Hirshmana Street is a small Neo-Renaissance style mansion, built in the late 19th century for Professor V. P. Buzeskul. At one time, it was home to the Palace of Newborns; the building is currently abandoned. On the opposite corner stands the former mansion of ophthalmologist Dr. L. Hirshman, designed by architect I. Hinsh in 1879.

The Boiko building at 44 Myronosytska Street (architects: S. Tymoshenko, P. Shyrshov, and P. Sokolov; 1912–1914) was constructed in the Ukrainian Art Nouveau style for entrepreneur Ivan Boiko. Its original appearance, including interior design contributions by artists S. Vasylkivskyi and M. Samokysh, has been altered by later additions.

Further along both sides of Myronosytska Street are buildings of various functions and architectural styles. Among them are structures in the Neoclassical style, such as the Abramov Mansion, as well as Art Nouveau buildings designed by architects Korniyenko, Piskunov, and others. At the intersection with Svobody Street stands a landmark of the Constructivist era — the Telephone Exchange Building. It was constructed in the classical variant of 1920s Constructivism but has been visually compromised by later additions.

At the corner of Myronosytska and Karazina Streets is a mansion in the Art Nouveau style that belonged to Professor Pavlo Vasylovych Mikhin, a specialist in obstetrics and gynecology. The building was erected in the early 20th century.

At the intersection of Myronosytska and Oles Honchar Streets stands the building of L. Hirshman's Ophthalmological Clinic, built in 1911–1912 in the Art Nouveau style. A bit further, at 92 Myronosytska Street, is the former building of the Women’s Medical Courses (currently an academic building of the Technical University of Agriculture), constructed in 1914 based on the design by architect Oleksiy Beketov, a member of the Academy of Architecture.

The residential building at 91 Myronosytska Street is a four-story structure built in 1930 and is considered a monument of architecture. It is classified either as Constructivist or Modernist in style and was designed by architect Viktor Trotsenko. It sustained damage during a German bombardment in World War II and was partially destroyed by a Russian missile strike on January 29, 2023.

== Urban Transport on Myronosytska Street ==
Tram routes:

- No. 12: Lisopark — Vokzalna — Novozhanove
- No. 22: 602nd Microdistrict — Lisopark
- No. 26: Pivdenno-Skhidna (Tile Plant) — Central Park

Bus routes:

- No. 223e: "Yaroslav Mudryi" Metro Station — Pyatykhatky
- No. 291t: "Yaroslav Mudryi" Metro Station — 23rd Serpnia Street — Central Market

== Gallery ==
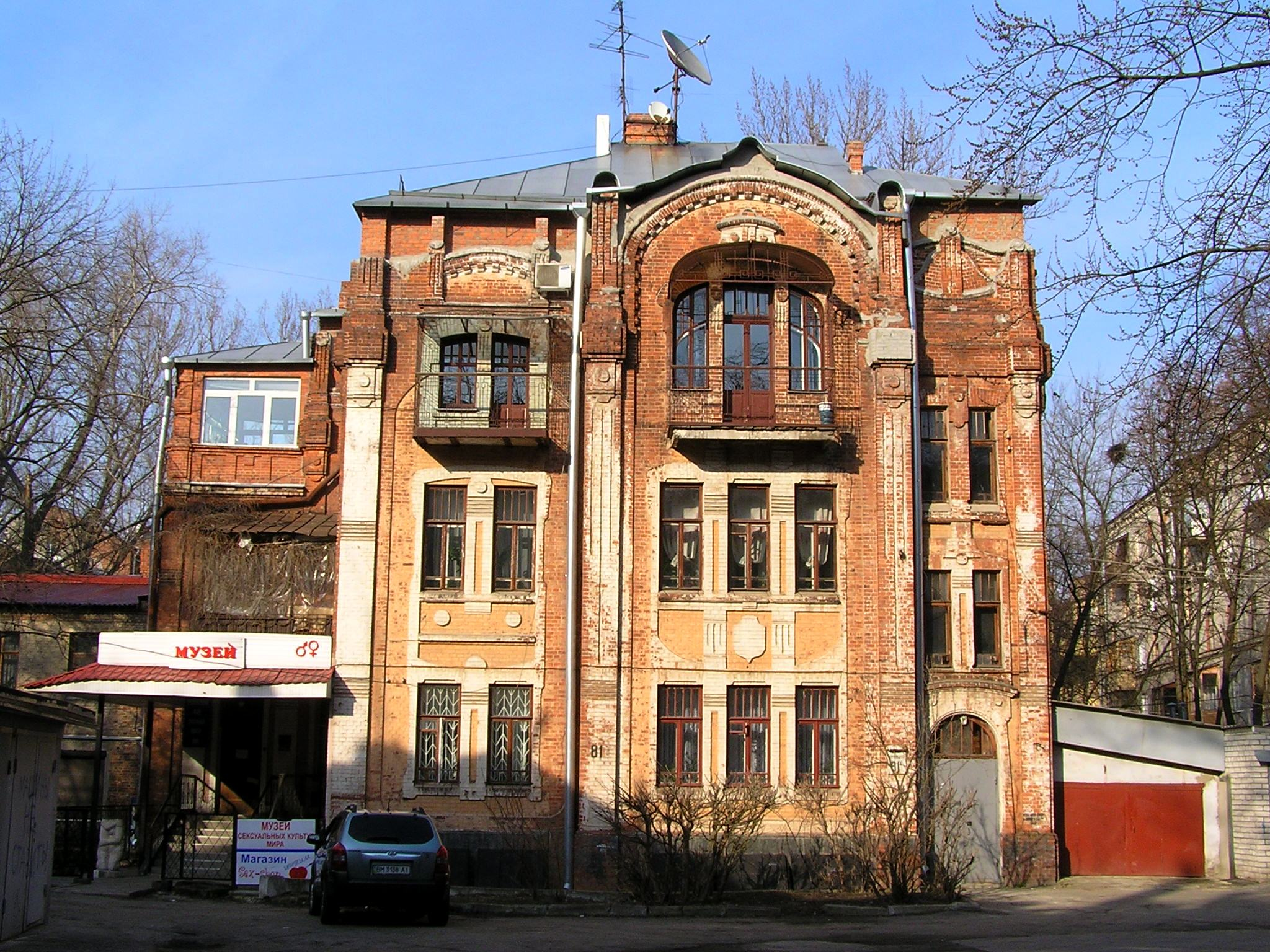
Museum of sexual culture

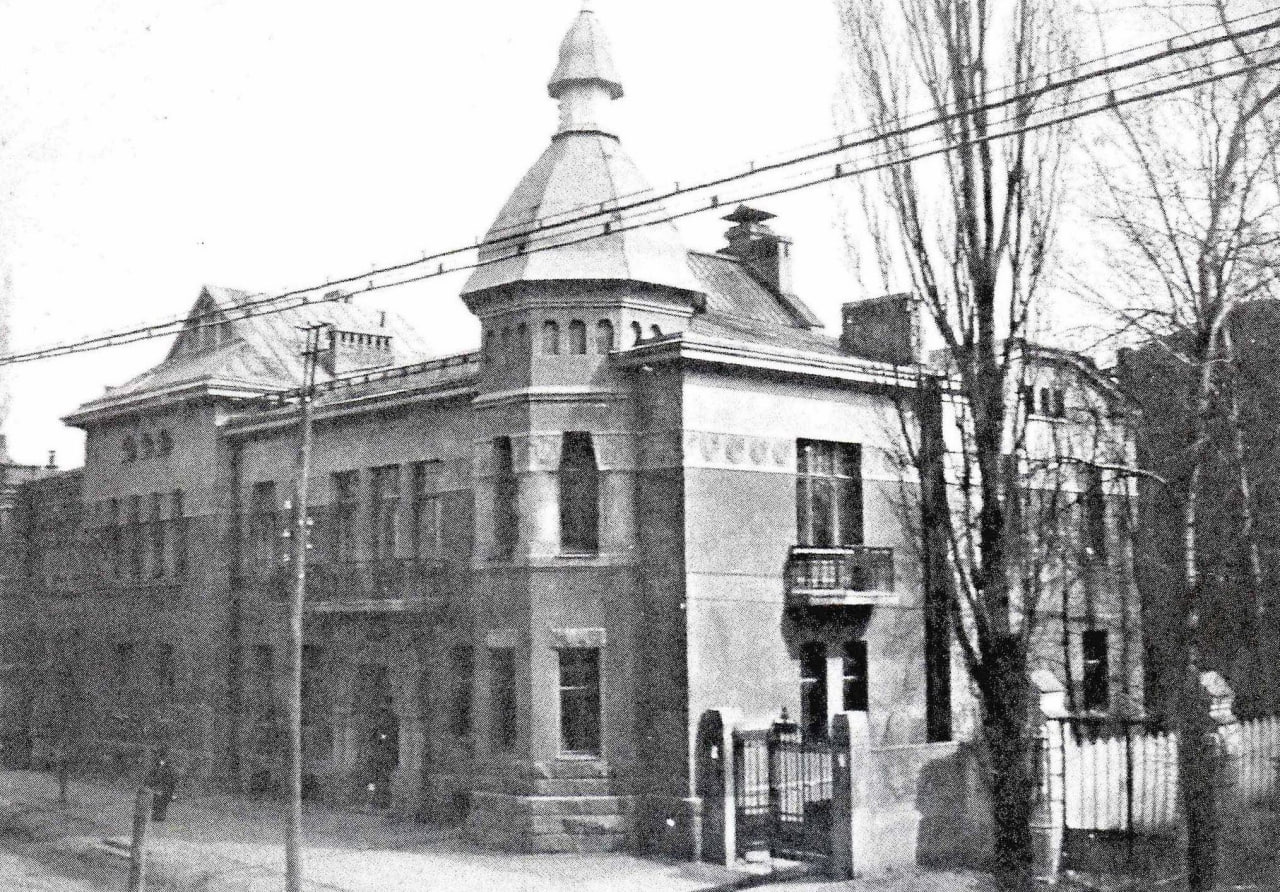
The Boiko House in the Ukrainian Art Nouveau style before reconstruction

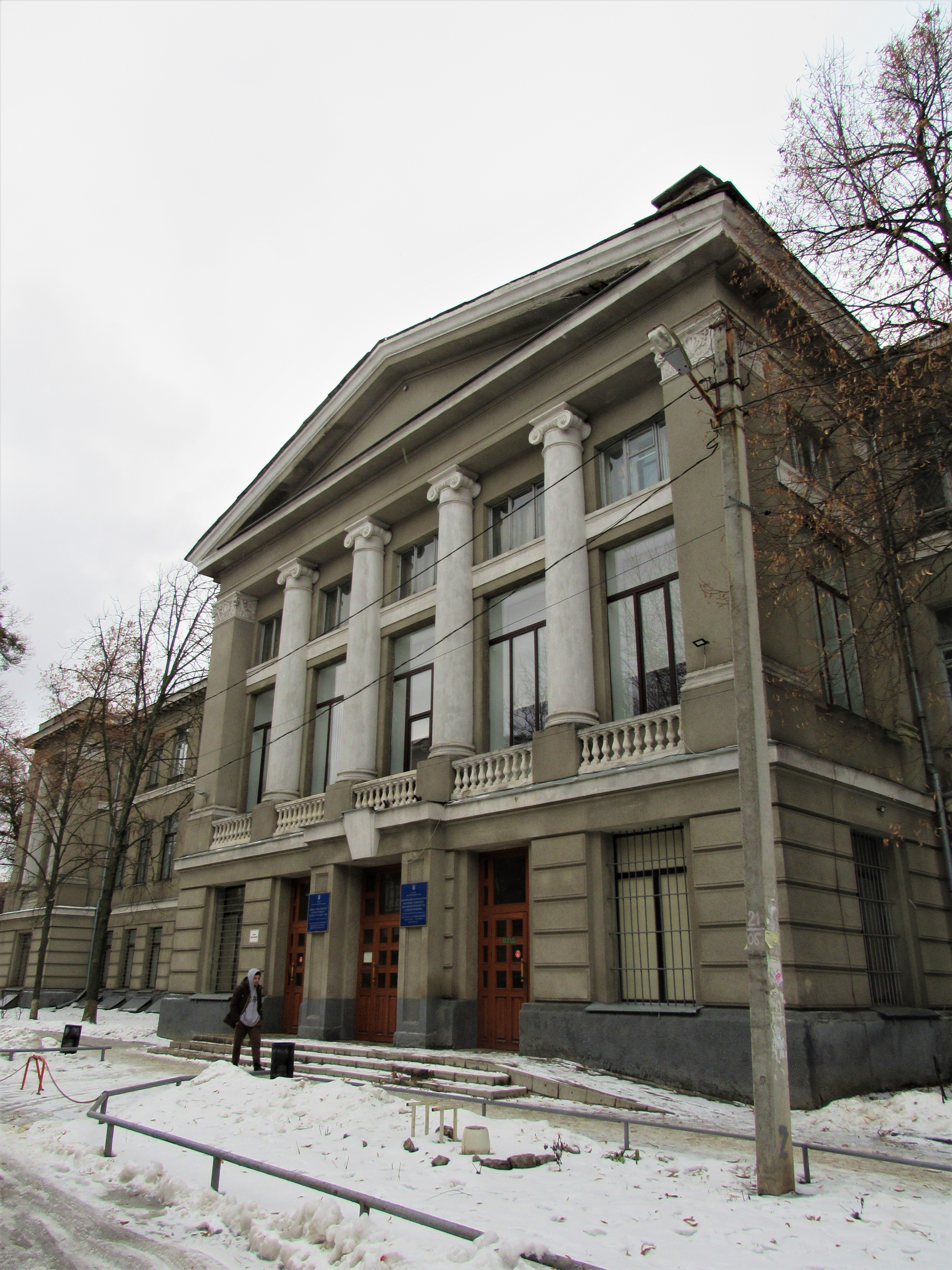
Building of higher women's courses

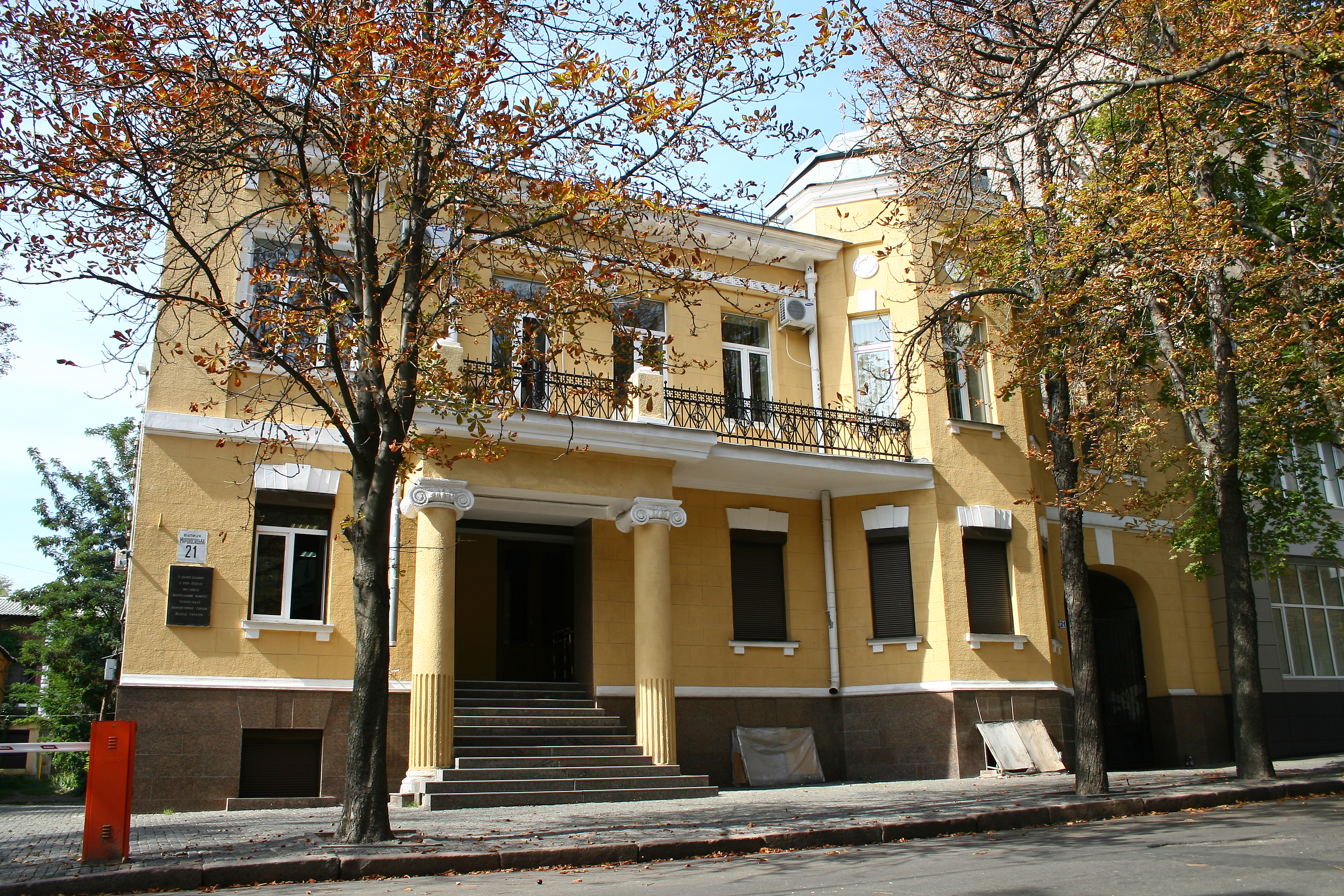
Old mansion on the street

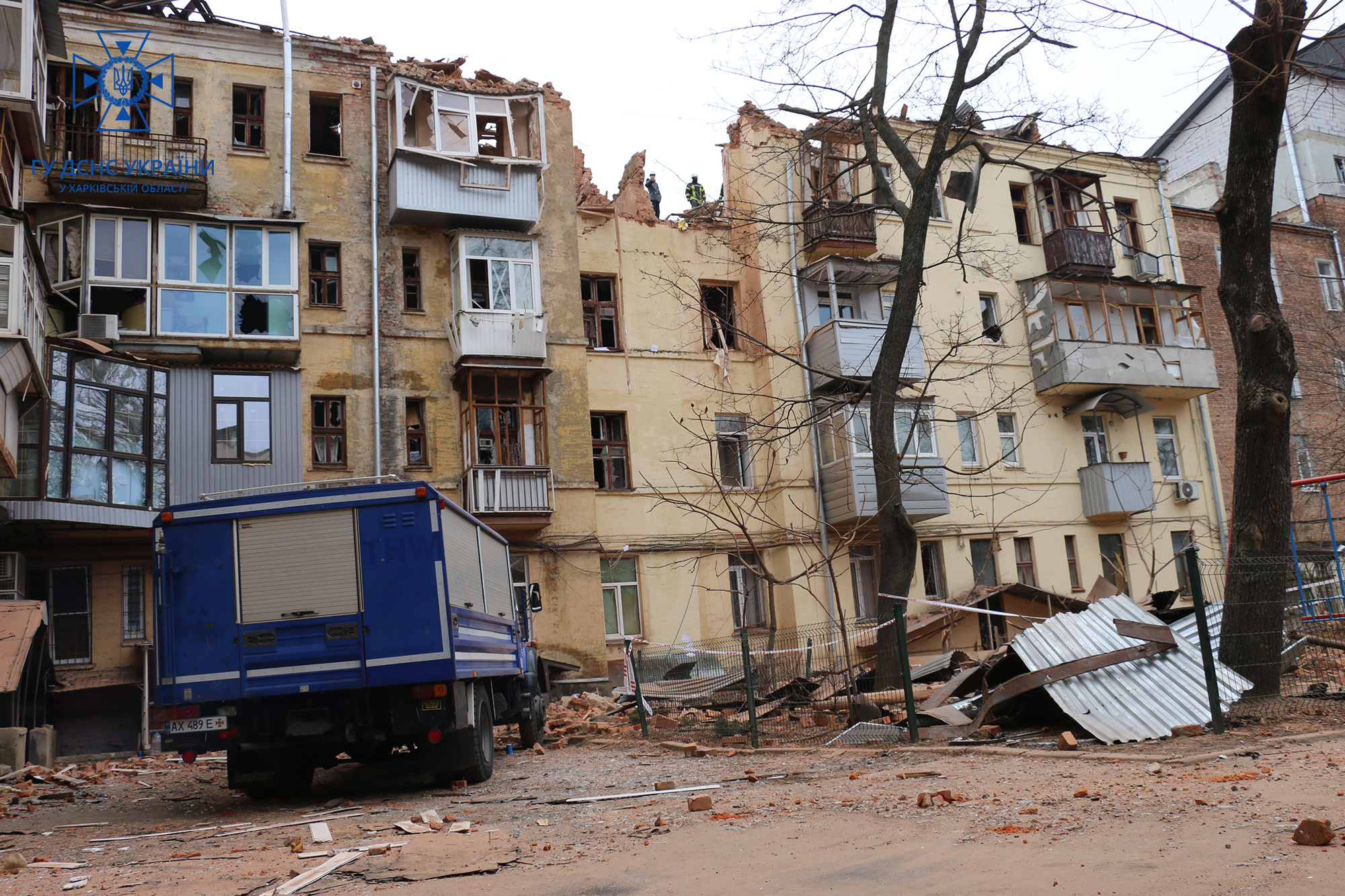
Street after Russian shelling

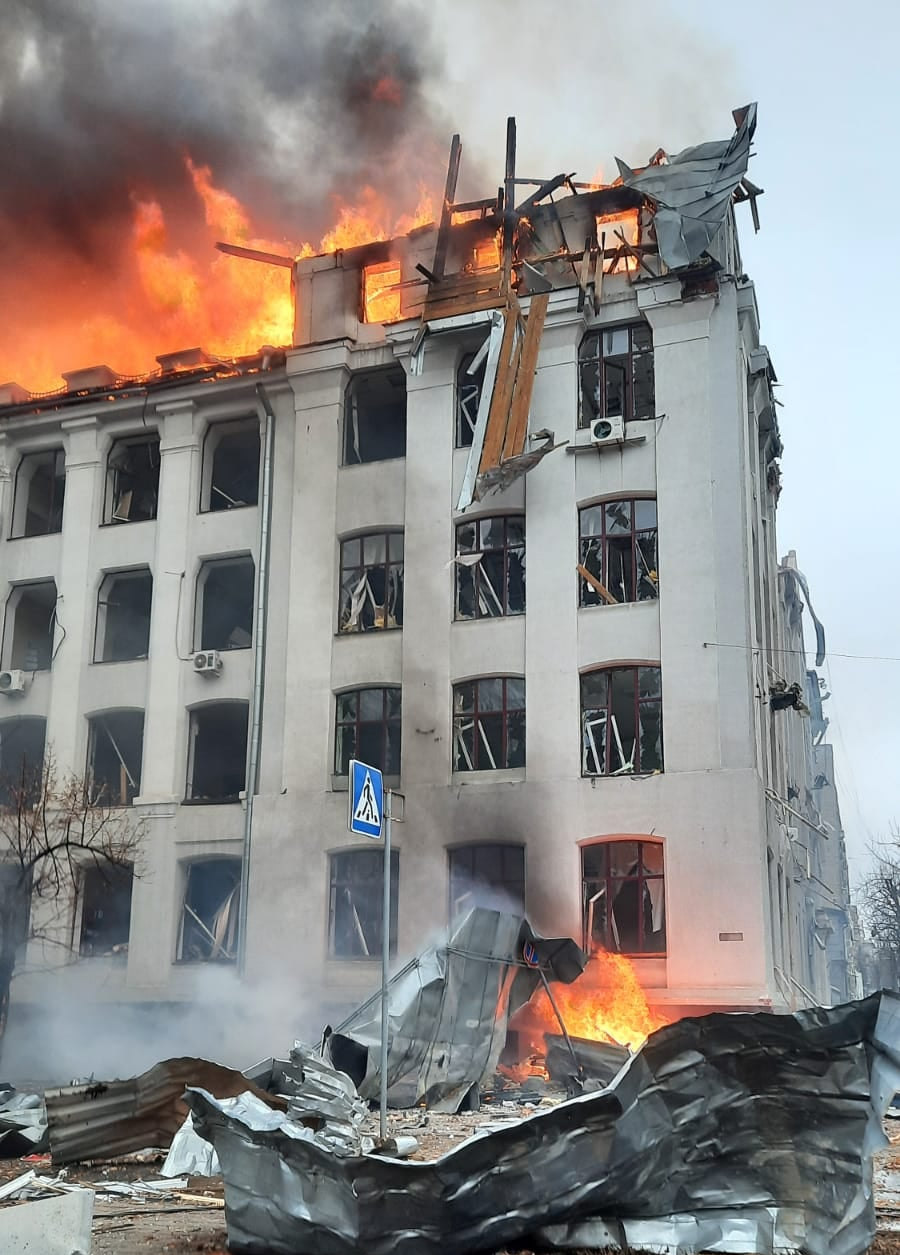
A house burns after Russian shelling
