= Serhii Vasylkivsky =

Ukraine artist

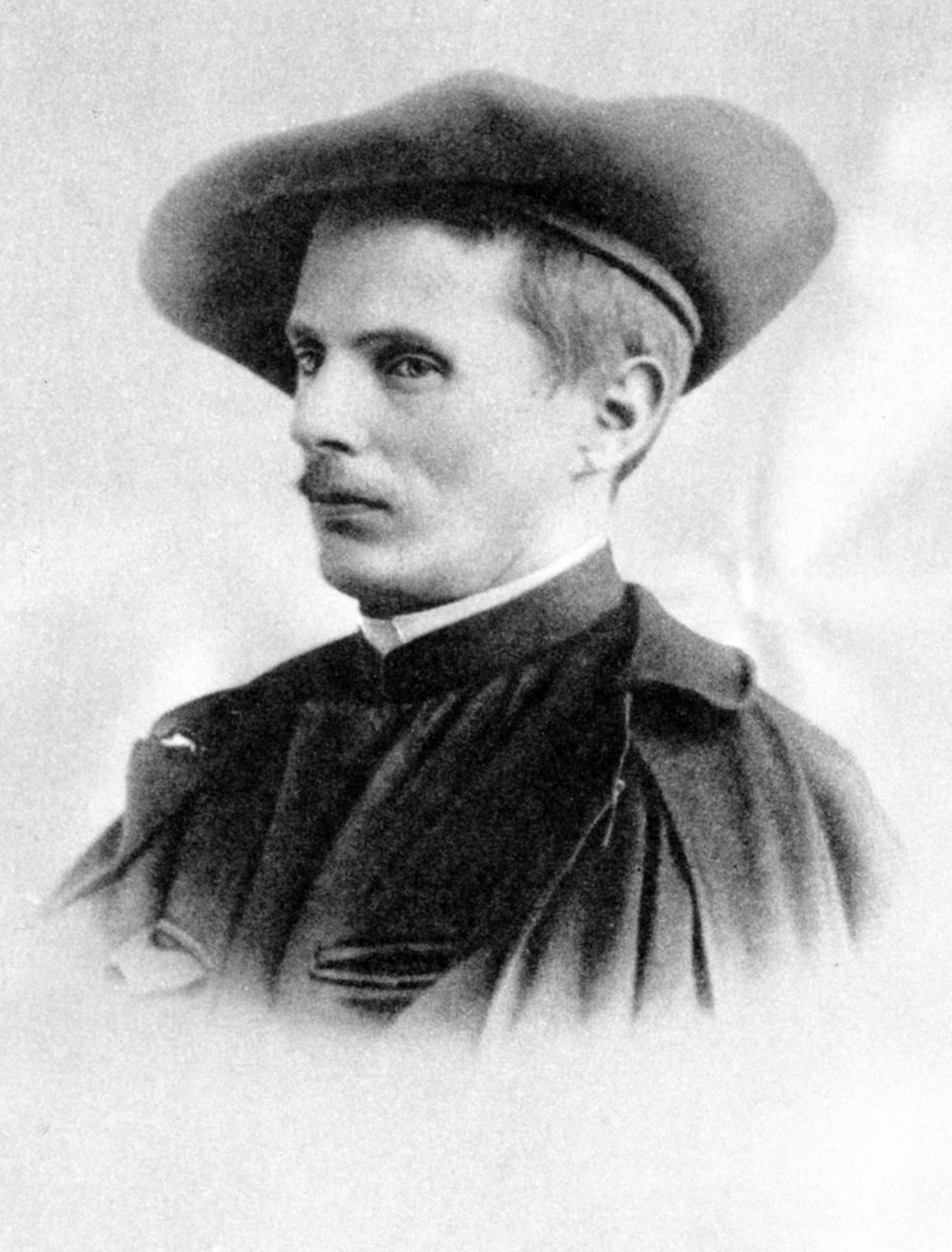
- Born: October 19, 1854; Izium, Izyumsky Uyezd, Kharkov Governorate, Russian Empire
- Died: October 8, 1917 (aged 62); Kharkiv
- Education: Imperial Academy of Arts (1885)
- Known for: Painting, Landscape art, Interior decoration
- Awards: Big Gold Medal of the Imperial Academy of Arts (1885)

Serhii Ivanovych Vasylkivsky (Ukrainian: Сергій Іванович Васильківський, pronounced [serˈɦij wɐsɪlʲˈkiu̯sʲkɪj]; Russian: Серге́й Иванович Васильковский; October 19, 1854 — October 7, 1917) was one of the most prolific Ukrainian artists of the pre-revolutionary period and an expert on Ukrainian ornamentation and folk art.

== Biography ==
Vasylkivsky grew up in an environment conducive to his development as an artist. He was born and spent his childhood in the picturesque surroundings of Izium, a city in the historical region of Sloboda Ukraine, and today's Kharkiv Oblast. The future painter had a chumak grandfather whose roots reached cossack ancestral lines. Vasylkivsky's father was a writer and taught his son the aesthetics of proper calligraphy. His mother, through her folk songs set the foundation which provided the inspiration for Vasylkivsky's art later in life.

When he was seven years old, his parents moved to Kharkiv, which at the time was a significant cultural center of Sloboda Ukraine. Vasylkivsky's first art lessons were given at the Kharkiv gymnasium by Dmytro Bezperchy, a student of Karl Briullov. During the years of his study, Vasylkivsky was able to use the extensive book collection of his relative and poet, V. Alexandrov. Among these were the works by Ivan Kotlyarevsky, Taras Shevchenko, and Nikolai Gogol, which made a strong impression on the young artist. After five years of education at the gymnasium and at the demand of his father, Vasylkivsky began studies at the Kharkiv Veterinary School. This lasted until 1873, when Vasylkivsky left veterinary studies due to his parents inability to pay for tuition. For a while, he worked as a civil servant in Kharkiv.

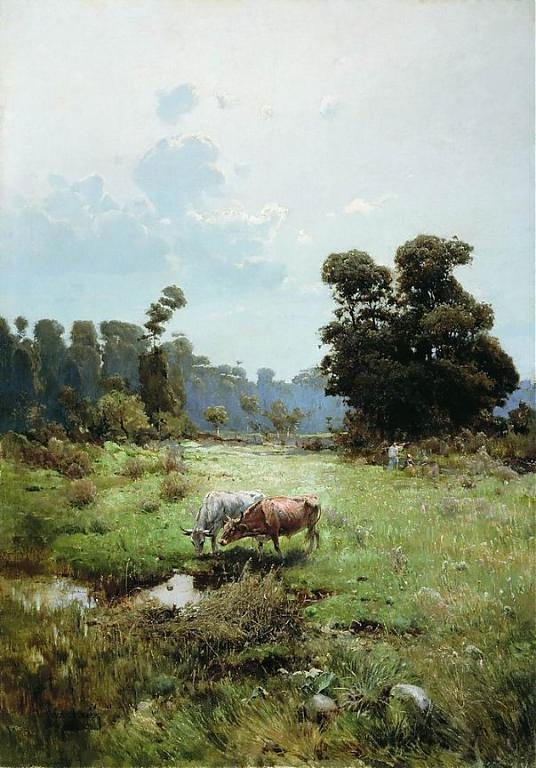
Cossack Meadow by Serhii Vasylkivsky. (1893)

In 1876, contrary to his father's wishes, Vasylkivsky left for the St. Petersburg Academy of Fine Arts. While there, Vasylkivsky was supervised by well known landscape painters Volodymyr Orlovsky and Mykhailo Klodt. His education was supplemented with traveling exhibitions and trips back home. Upon graduation in 1885 he traveled to Europe and North Africa on a scholarship from the Academy, painting places he visited from Spain to Germany and Egypt.

In Paris, Vasylkivsky became fascinated with the Barbizon school. By the time he returned to the Academy, Vasylkivsky brought with him an exhibition of almost 50 art works. Critics praised these paintings, calling them "miniature pearls". The paintings reflected the influence of the Barbizon School's panoramic depiction of space, the sky and the silvery atmosphere of "Pierre Corot". Vasylkivsky retained these characteristics in his Ukrainian landscapes.

After settling in Kharkiv in 1888, he became active in Ukrainian artistic circles and headed the architectural and art society there. Vasylkivsky died at age 62 in Kharkiv. Shortly before his death, he gave all his drawings to the Kharkiv Ukrainian Art Museum. In the same year, the newspaper "Nova Rada" called the artist "a pleasant person", "an interesting storyteller" and "a conscious Ukrainian".

== Art works ==
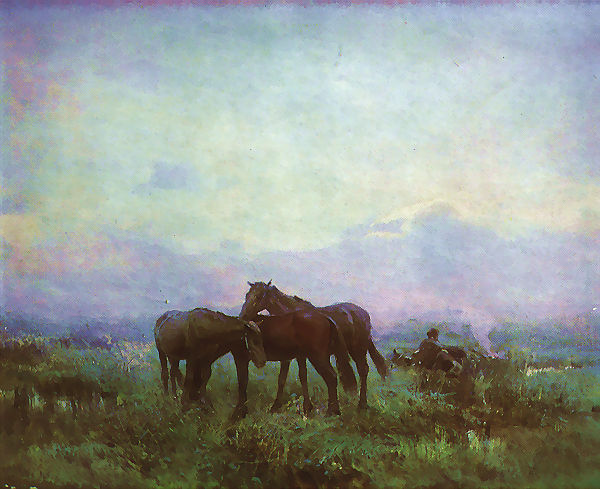
Cossack Picket by Serhii Vasylkivsky. (1888)

A typical Vasylkivsky theme is an armed horse-mounted Zaporozhian Cossack in the Ukrainian steppes or a group of cossacks on sentry duty, traveling or resting. To this group of works belong panoramic views with historical titles such as "Cossack Mountain".

In the middle of the painting "Cossack Picket" (1888), three horses stand in the dawn light; to the right, near the fire, sit resting cossacks who are on watch duty in the steppes. The sky and the unbounded steppes, veiled in lily-blue fog, and wet grass and humid air, change colors gradually.

== Legacy ==
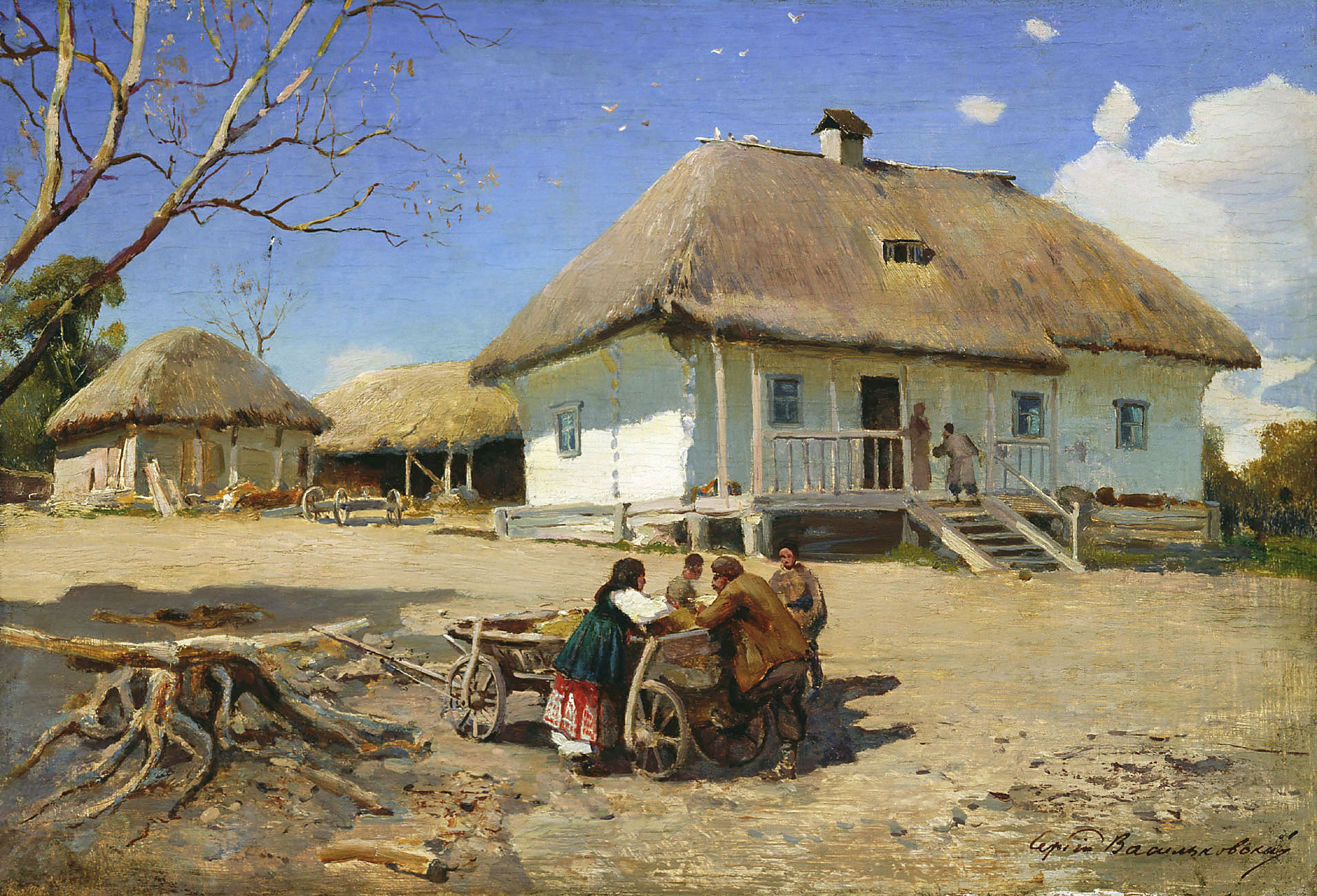
Cossack house by Serhii Vasylkivsky. Oil on canvas.

The end of the nineteenth century and early twentieth century saw an upsurge of interest in Ukrainian culture and the flourishing of Ukrainian painting. Painters such as Serhiy Vasylkivsky and Oleksandr Murashko introduced new subjects, new approaches, new visions and new techniques to keep abreast with the latest developments in European painting of those times.

Vasylkivsky left behind almost 3,000 works of realist and impressionist art, sketches, drawings, a great number of which were lost during World War II. He was the first, after Taras Shevchenko, to draw upon subject matter from Ukraine's past and completed a number of works on historical and ethnographic themes.

Vasylkivsky created three large panels for the Poltava Governorate Zemstvo (Provincial Land Administration) building which was designed by the Ukrainian architect Vasyl Krychevsky: The Chumak Road to Romodan, Election of Pushkar, The Duel of Cossack Holota with a Tatar. As well, he helped design the interior ornamentation in a 'Modern Ukrainian' folk style.

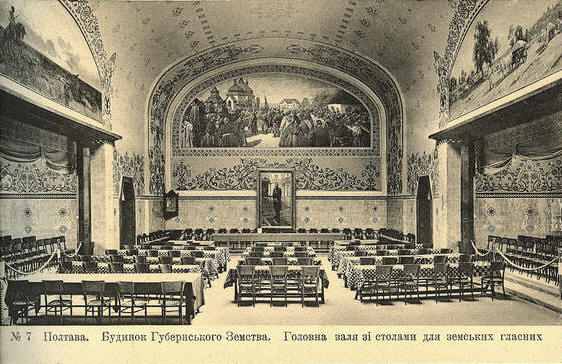
Interior of the Poltava Governorate Zemstvo Building, early 1900s. Visible are the 3 large painted panels by Vasylkivsky.

Together with Mykola Samokysh and ethnographer and archaeologist, Dmytro Yavornytsky, Vasylkivsky worked on the album "From Ukrainian Antiquity" (1900).
