= Gabel (surname) =

Gabel or Gäbel is a German surname. Notable people with the surname include:

- Andrew Gabel (born 1964), American speed skater
- Augustina Gabel (1853–1907), Ukrainian librarian and revolutionary.
- Birgitte Sofie Gabel (1746–1769), Danish noblewoman
- Christoffer Gabel (1617–1673), Danish statesman
- Claudia Gabel (born 1975), American author
- Elyes Gabel (born 1983), English actor
- Frederik Gabel (1645–1708), Danish-Norwegian nobleman
- Jens Gäbel (born 1968), German curler
- Joseph Gabel (1912–2004), French sociologist
- Keith Gabel (born 1984), American snowboarder
- Kristoffer Gabel (1617–1673), Danish statesman
- Loren Gabel (born 1997), Canadian ice hockey player
- Ludmila Gabel (1876–1967), Ukrainian librarian, public figure and lawyer.
- Martin Gabel (1912–1986), American actor, director, and producer
- Peter Gabel (1947–2022), American law academic
- Robyn Gabel (born 1953), American politician
- Scilla Gabel (born 1938), Italian actress
- Seth Gabel (born 1981), American actor
- Shainee Gabel, film director, A Love Song for Bobby Long
- Thuraya Qabil (born 1943), Saudi Arabian poet and journalist whose surname is sometimes spelt 'Gabel'.
- Yuri Gabel (1891–1949), Soviet Ukrainian chemist.
