= Gable (disambiguation) =

A gable is the portion of a wall between the lines of a sloping roof. The gable roof is the most common design of the roof in cold and moderate climates.

Gable may also refer to:

== People ==
- Gable (surname), a surname
- Gable Garenamotse (born 1977), Botswana long jumper
- Gable Steveson (born 2000), American freestyle wrestler

== Places in the United States ==
- Gable Field, part of Doc Wadley Stadium, Oklahoma
- Gable Mansion, Woodland, California
- Gable Mountain, Montana

== Other uses ==
- Gable hood, an English woman's headdress
- Gable stone, an ornament in Dutch architecture

== See also ==
- Great Gable, English mountain
- Green Gable, English fell
- Gableboat, a traditional Norwegian fishing vessel
- Gabel (disambiguation)
- Gables (disambiguation)
