= Orest Gabel =

Orest-Octavian Martinovich Gabel
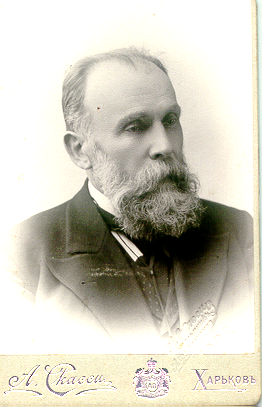
- Occupations: Public and political figure
- Spouse: Augustina Gabel
- Children: Ludmila, Elena, Valeria, Maria, Yuri, Margarita

Orest-Octavian Martinovich Gabel (c. 1849 — 15 March 1915) was a revolutionary Narodnik, a librarian, and a public figure in Imperial Russia. He participated in the activities of the Kyiv Commune, as well as in the Bosnian-Herzegovinian uprising of 1875–1877.

== Biography ==
He was born in late 1849 in the town of Volochysk, Starokostiantyniv District of the Volyn Governorate in a Polish family of Martin Gabel and his wife Balbina. His father was an Austrian subject and worked as a pharmacist; besides Orest, the family had two sons, Eduard and Modest, and a daughter, Ludvika. Later, the family moved to the town of Kupil. He received his primary education at the Kamyanets-Podilsky Boys' Gymnasium, which he completed in 1868. The following year, he entered the medical faculty of the Saint Vladimir Imperial University of Kyiv.

In addition to Gabel, there were brothers Ivan and Volodymyr Debogoriy-Mokrievichi, Grigori Machtet, Nikolai Sudzilovsky, Ivan Khodko and several other Narodniks. The members of the group planned to move to the United States and establish a farming commune there. The group was viewed negatively by other Narodnik groups in Kyiv, and its members were not seen as revolutionaries, but as adventurers.

On 2 March 1873, a search was conducted at his apartment in Saint Petersburg during a gathering of students. His correspondence with emigrants and politically undesirable individuals was found. Gabel was summoned for interrogation, and on 22 June that year the case was closed due to lack of evidence of criminal activity. By order of the Third Section, he was sent to live with his father in Volyn Governorate.

Gabel responded to the call of Mikhail Sazhin and, as part of a group of Russian revolutionaries, set out for the Balkans to participate in the anti-Ottoman Bosnia-Herzegovina uprising, fighting in the unit of Peko Pavlovich. The Narodniks were widely seen as ineffective, and they all went to Switzerland with the onset of cold weather. In the 1870s, he lived in Geneva.

Later, he studied at the Imperial Medical-Surgical Academy (where he completed 3 courses) and at the Novorossiya University.

From May 1876, he lived in Saint Petersburg under the name Sobolev. The Gabel group prepared the organisation of the escape of arrested revolutionaries from the House of Preliminary Detention. The group included Grigori Machtet, who directly participated in preparing the escape of Sergei Kovalik and Porfiriy Voynaralsky. On 17 August 1877, Gabel was arrested for his connections with Kovalik and the prisoners of the preliminary detention centre. He was arrested under the name Klymenko. That same day, he was imprisoned in the Peter and Paul Fortress. On 23 June 1878, he was released and exiled to Balagansk in the Irkutsk Governorate. Since the beginning of 1881, he was part of the Irkutsk circle, the "Red Cross of the People's Will" under the leadership of K.G. Neustroyev, which aimed to assist in the escape and organisation of the release of political exiles.

From 1881 to 1886, he was placed under surveillance in Kharkiv Governorate.

In 1886, he was the chief inspector of the Kharkiv representation of the Warsaw Insurance Company, and from 1903, its manager.

== Public activity ==
Since 1894, Gabel was a member of the Kharkiv Society for the Promotion of Literacy among the People, and from 1897 onwards, he was elected as its lifelong member. Initially, he was part of the audit commission, and from 1897 for 14 years, he was a member of the board. He managed the accounting, and was part of the committee for rural libraries. With the committee's participation, nearly 500 public libraries were opened in the Kharkiv Governorate. In 1906, the Kharkiv Governorate ranked first among the governorates of the Russian Empire in the number of reading rooms. He was a member of the Kharkiv Public Library, a board member of the library (1893–1915), a comrade (deputy) chairman of the library board (1905–1915). During this time, he maintained the library's inventory and worked on raising funds for the library's construction. He appealed to the progressive intelligentsia of the city, and organised musical events and concerts to help fund the library's construction, and was a member of the construction commission for the construction of the new library premises.

He was also a comrade (deputy) of the chairman of the parent committee of the Third Men's Gymnasium. He was elected to the audit commission of the Kharkiv Mutual Credit Society (1895). He contributed to the work of the Kharkiv Historical-Philological Society, attending meetings as a guest. At a society meeting on child physical education, which included 200 members, he delivered a report on protecting children from abusive treatment (1901).

== Death and legacy ==
Gabel died in 1915. That year, in his honour, the meeting of the library's board approved ten subscriptions in Gabel's name free of charge to female students attending advanced courses.

His funeral was attended by: the mayor Dmytro Bahalii, the head of the board of the Kharkiv Public Library Oleksiy Antsiferov, as well as professors Volodymyr Levytskyi and Ivan Krasuskyi.

== Bibliography ==
- Burial of O. M. Gabel (18 March 1915), "Burial of O. M. Gabel", Morning (in Russian), no. 2608
- Fyodorov, V.G. (2013). Foreign Subjects. Volyn, Kiev and Podolsk Governorates of the Russian Empire (in Russian). Kyiv: Summit-Book. p. 618. ISBN 978-617-7182-01-5.
- In memory of O. M. Gabel (17 March 1915), "In memory of O. M. Gabel", Morning (in Russian), no. 2607
- Podolinsky, Sergiy Andriyovych (2002). "Memories of S. Podolinsky". In R. Serbin; T. Slyudykova (eds.). Sergiy Podolinsky. Letters and Documents. Kyiv. p. 422. ISBN 966-625-010-1.
- University News (February 1870), "List of students of the Imperial University of St. Vladimir, for the first half of 1869—1870 academic year", University News (in Russian), no. 2, Kyiv
