= Nadezhda Bantle =

Belarusian physician (1851–1934)

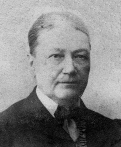
- Bantle (1910)
- Born: 10 November 1851; Mogilev, Russian Empire (now Belarus)
- Died: 30 October 1934 (aged 82); Minsk, Belarusian SSR, Soviet Union
- Education: Imperial Medical and Surgical Academy
- Years active: 1876–1933
- Medical career
- Profession: Physician, surgeon, combat medic
- Institutions: Nikolskoye Hospital
- Awards: Hero of Labour (1928)

Nadezhda Antonovna Bantle (Russian: Надежда Антоновна Бантле; (Note: Also known by the Belarusian: Надзея Антонаўна Бантле, romanized: Nadzieja Antonaŭna Bantlie.) 1851–1934) was a Belarusian physician. After graduating from the Imperial Medical and Surgical Academy, she worked as a doctor in Novgorod and Saratov, as well as in Kherson during the Russo-Turkish War. During the late 1870s, Bantle began collaborating with the Narodniks, for which she was arrested and exiled to the Vologda province of the Russian North, where she became the region's first woman doctor. In the small village of Nikolskoye, she took over the local hospital and oversaw the establishment of a smallpox vaccine program and a maternity ward, making it the most advanced hospital in the province. For her efforts, Bantle was awarded the title of Hero of Labour by the Soviet government. After 48 years of working in Nikolskoye, she returned to Belarus, where she died from old age.

== Biography ==
Nadezhda Antonovna Bantle was born on 10 November 1851 in the Mogilev Governorate of the Russian Empire (modern-day Belarus). She was the daughter of a pharmacist. She enrolled in the Bestuzhev Courses, graduating from the Imperial Medical and Surgical Academy in Saint Petersburg. She worked as a doctor in the provinces of Novgorod and Saratov. During the Russo-Turkish War, Bantle also worked as a combat medic. From her field hospital in Mykolaiv, she treated more than 1,000 wounded soldiers in Kherson province.

By the time she graduated, she was already collaborating with the Narodniks. On 15 August 1876, Grigori Machtet directed Bantle, as well as Aleksandr Klushyn and Augustina Sinkevich, to remove any items that might compromise them from the flat of Yevgeny Bartoshevich. Bantle was arrested two days later and imprisoned in the Peter and Paul Fortress, but was released on 9 October 1876. She was later charged with communicating with people imprisoned in Saint Petersburg's pre-trial detention centre in order to secure their release. On 2 October 1877, the case against her was dismissed. She was eventually exiled to the Russian North due to her continued collaboration with the Narodniks.

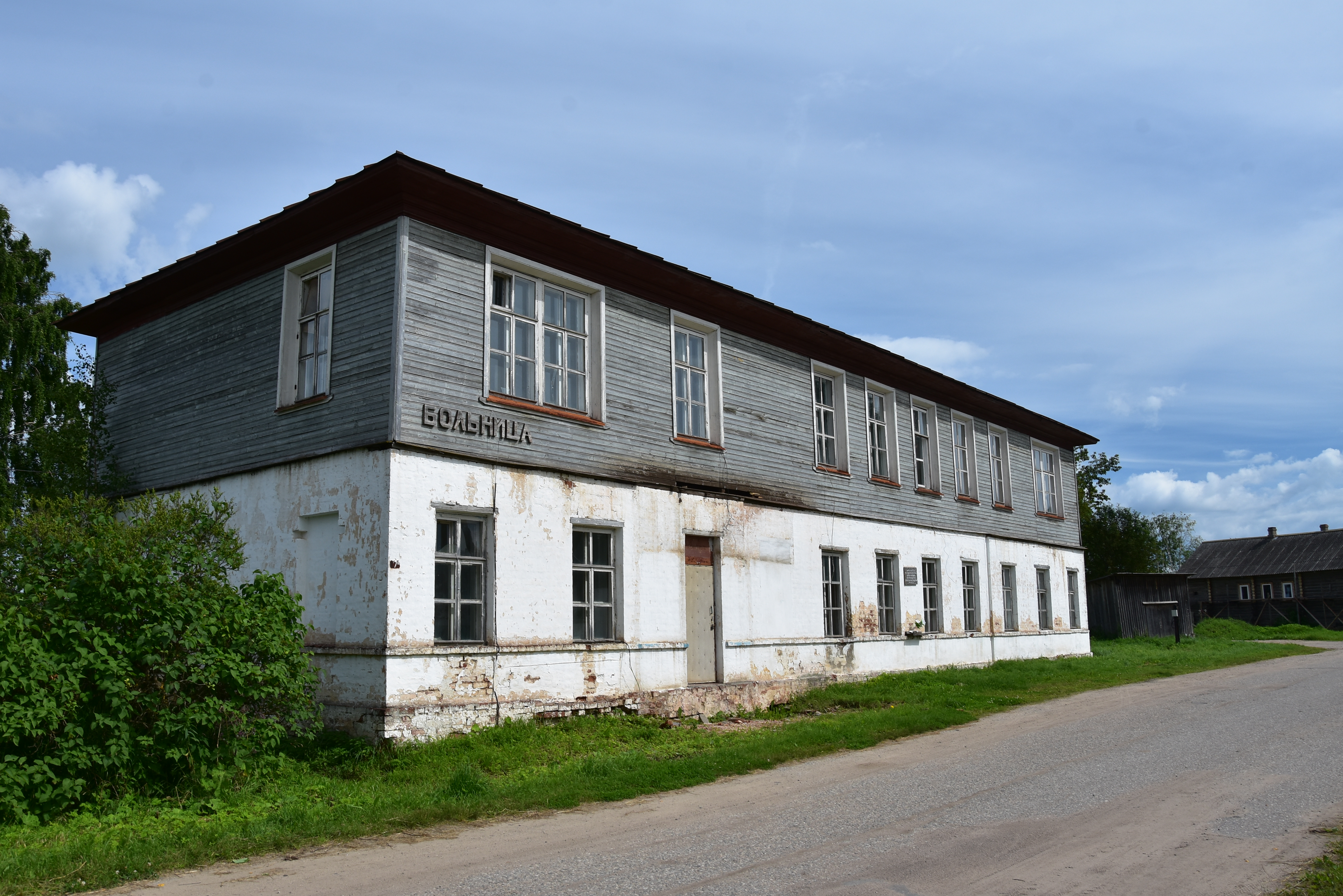
The hospital in Nikolskoye, which Bantle managed from 1885 to 1933

From 1885 to 1933, Bantle headed the hospital in the small village of Nikolskoye in the Vologda province. The hospital had been opened in 1871, and Bantle was the first woman doctor in the history of Vologda province. According to the account of one local, Vladimir Emmanuilovich, the hospital became the most advanced in the province under Bantle's stewardship. During her time in Nikolskoye, she established an inoculation program to provide people with the smallpox vaccine, as well as a maternity ward and a nursery. In 1923, when a tuberculosis outbreak hit Vologda province, Bantle collected thousands of rubles through a medical lottery to help fight the disease.

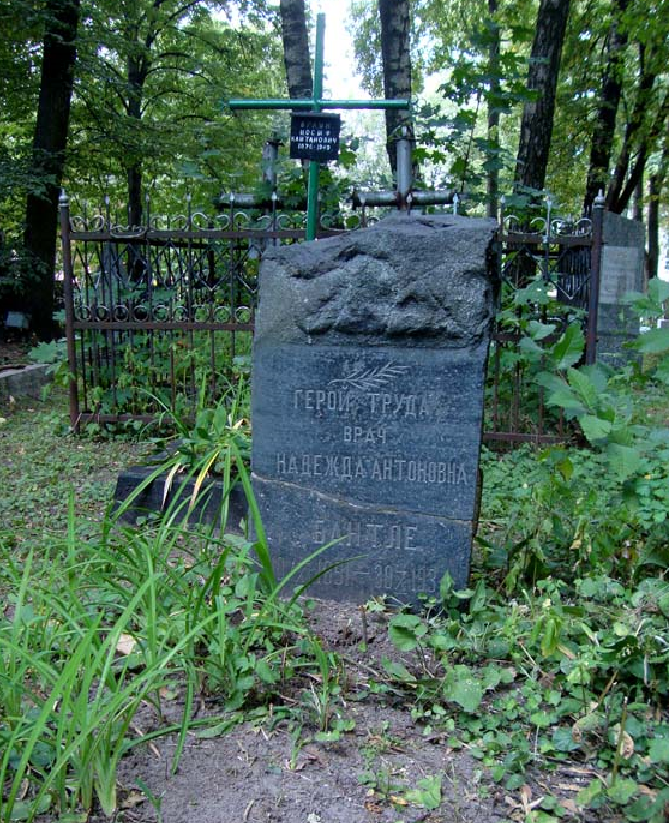
Bantle's grave in the Military Cemetery of Minsk

In 1928, she was awarded the title Hero of Labour by the government of Alexei Rykov. In 1933, she left Nikolskoye at the age of 79, after 48 years of work at the local hospital. She returned to Belarus and settled in Minsk with her daughter. She died on 30 October 1934 and was buried in Minsk's Military Cemetery.

== Legacy ==
Bantle is remembered fondly in Nikolskoye, where a memorial stone was erected in her memory. The hospital was also renamed after her, with Mikhail Vasilyevich Pulyaev taking over its operations. She was also the subject of numerous articles in Soviet newspapers, such as the Izvestia.

== Bibliography ==
- Ishutin, Oleg (16 May 2014). "Бантле Надежда Антоновна (10.11.1851 - 30.10.1934)" [Bantle Nadezhda Antonovna (10.11.1851 - 30.10.1934)]. Meditsinskii Necropol (in Russian). Archived from the original on 10 November 2016.
- Kon, Feliks, ed. (1929). "Бантле, Надежда" [Bantle, Nadezhda]. Actors of the revolutionary movement in Russia (in Russian). Vol. 2. Moscow: Society of Former Political Prisoners and Exiled Settlers. pp. 79–80. OCLC 973234240.
- Romanov, Vladimir (9 August 2007). "По велению долга и сердца" [Out of duty and heart]. Vologodskaya Nedelya (in Russian). No. 26. OCLC 1404396165. Archived from the original on 3 October 2017.
