= The Gables =

The Gables may refer to:

- The Gables, a fictional school in The Adventure of the Lion's Mane, a Sherlock Holmes story by Sir Arthur Conan Doyle
- The Gables, Gauteng, a suburb of Johannesburg, South Africa
- The Gables at Cobb Village, a residential community in Royston, Georgia
- Coral Gables, Florida is sometimes referred to as "The Gables"
- The Gables Colonial Hospital New Plymouth, a heritage buildings from New Plymouth, registered by Heritage New Zealand as a Category 1 Historic Place.

== See also ==
- Gables (disambiguation)
- The Three Gables
