= Pavel Chernyshev =

Russian medical student (1854–1876)

- Born: c. 1854; Samara Governorate, Russian Empire
- Died: March 1876; St. Petersburg, Russian Empire
- Education: Medical and Surgical Academy, St. Petersburg
- Occupation: Medical student
- Political party: Narodnik

Pavel Feoktistovich Chernyshev (1854 – March 1876) was a Russian medical student who died in custody after being arrested for his political views.

== Early life ==
Pavel Feoktistovich Chernyshev was born around 1854 in Samara Governorate, Russia, to noble parents.

== Arrest and death ==
By 1874, Chernyshev was a medical student at the Medical and Surgical Academy in St. Petersburg. While a student, he helped organize and served as treasurer for the Samartsy, a populist St. Petersburg student society. He took part in the "Going to the People" movement, and it is for this participation that he was arrested by authorities on August 30, 1874 and incarcerated shortly thereafter. He was released on bail on March 11, 1876; having contracted tuberculosis while in prison, he died in a hospital soon after his release.

Chernyshev's primary claims to fame are his imprisonment, death, and funeral, all of which occurred over about 18 months from his arrest to his funeral on March 30, 1876. The funeral at Volkovo Cemetery became the seed of a large populist anti-government demonstration, and the composer Grigori A. Machtet wrote the poem "The Last Farewell" (literally "Succumbed to the ordeal of imprisonment") in his memory. The poem lives on as the lyrics to the song "Slavery and Suffering" (Esclavage et souffrance) which has been performed by the Red Army Choir and was a popular revolutionary song.
