= Gabl =

Gabl is a Germanic surname. Notable people with the surname include:

- Franz Gabl (1921–2014), Austrian alpine skier, uncle of Gertrude
- Gertrude Gabl (1948–1976), Austrian alpine skier, niece of Franz

== See also ==
- Gable (surname)
