= Gabel =

Gabel may refer to:

== People ==
- Gabel (surname)

== Places ==
- Bahr el Gabel, the former name of the Central Equatoria province of Sudan
- Gabel (known as Deutsch Gabel between 1901 and 1945), former name of the town of Jablonné v Podještědí, Liberec Region, Czech Republic
- Gabel an der Adler, former name of the town of Jablonné nad Orlicí, Pardubice Region, Czech Republic

== Other uses ==
- The Catlin Gabel School, a pre-K to 12 school in Oregon
- Gabel (company), an Italian textile company

== See also ==
- Gabelle, a former French tax on salt
- Gable (disambiguation)
