= Augustina Gabel =

Librarian and revolutionary from the Russian Empire (1853–1907)

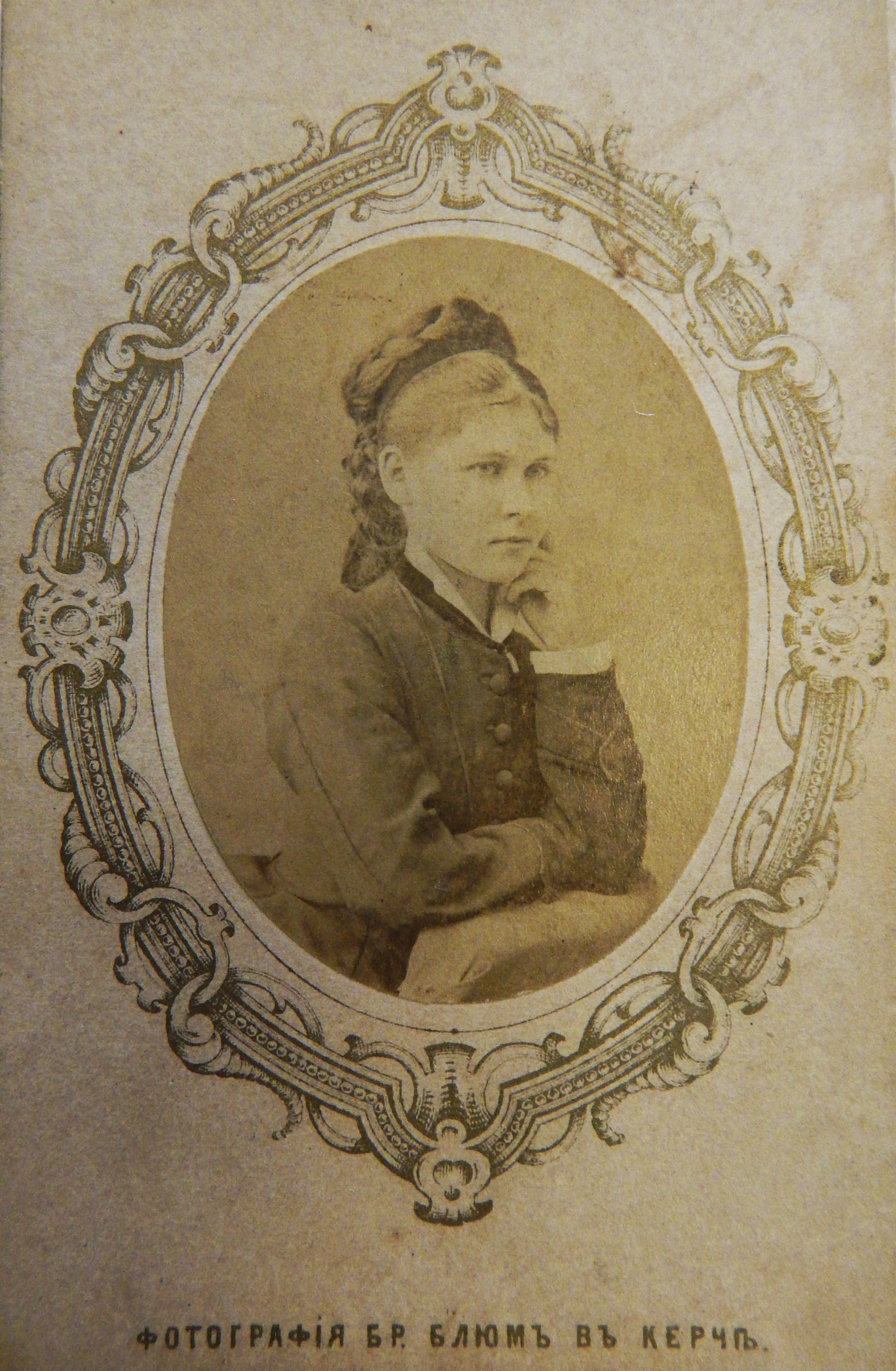
- A photograph of Gabel, taken in the photo studio of the Blum brothers
- Born: Augustina Sinkevich (Note: Various spellings of the surname include: Sinkevych, Sinkievich and Senkevich); 30 August 1863; Saint Petersburg, Russian Empire
- Died: 29 March 1907 (aged 43); Kharkiv, Russian Empire
- Spouse: Orest Gabel
- Children: Ludmila, Elena, Valeria, Maria, Yuri, Margarita

Augustina Stanislavovna Gabel (Russian: Августина Станиславовна Габель, romanized: Augustina Stanislavovna Habel; née Sinkevich; born 30 August 1853 – 29 March 1907) was a librarian and revolutionary from the Russian Empire. Orphaned at an early age, she was raised by her older sister and her husband. After receiving her education, she became involved in revolutionary activities, joining the Narodnik movement, which aimed to promote socialist ideas among the Russian peasantry.

She became a member a revolutionary group led by Orest Gabel, whom she later married. She participated in efforts to support the movement, including planning the escape of imprisoned comrades. She was arrested in 1876 and spent several months in prison, where she gave birth to her first child. After her release, she voluntarily went into exile in Siberia with her husband. The couple had five children during their time in exile and later moved to Kharkiv, modern-day Ukraine, where she became active in the cultural life of the city.

She worked at the Kharkiv Public Library from 1893 to 1903. As organiser of one of its branches, she corresponded with writers in order to raise funds and acquire books for the library.

Augustina Gabel died on 29 March 1907, in Kharkiv.

== Biography ==
=== Early life ===
Augustina Sinkevich (Note: Various spellings of the surname include: Sinkevych, Sinkievich and Senkevich) was born on 30 August 1853 in Saint Petersburg into the family of a Russified Pole, Titular Councillor Stanislav Vikentyevich Sinkevich. Her family was Catholic. At an early age, she was orphaned and raised in the family of her older sister Elena and her husband, a dentist, Samuel Linbek. She received her primary education at the Vasileostrovsky Girls' Gymnasium, from which she graduated in 1869. In her youth, she communicated with the artist Ilya Repin, whom she likely met at one of the student gatherings. The aspiring artist, then still a student at the Imperial Academy of Arts, sketched Augustina at the age of fifteen during a literary evening.

=== Revolutionary activities and exile ===
After graduating from gymnasium, she worked as a private teacher. In the mid-1870s, she ran a cooperative cobbler's workshop on Poshtamtska Street with Sofia Smitten. With the assistance of Augustina Sinkevich, Mikhail Ovchinnikov organized gatherings of workers where he spread revolutionary propaganda.

In 1874, Sinkevich was under covert surveillance, living with relatives in Kharkiv. In Kharkiv, Augustina met the Narodnik Porfiry Voinaralskiy and promoted revolutionary ideas, particularly among students. She participated in the Going to the People movement in Chuhuiv. Researcher Sofia Sholomova suggested that Augustina provided financial assistance to people in Chuhuiv, including the artist Ilya Repin, whom she had known since childhood.

Upon returning to the capital, she met the student Orest Gabel. He often visited her home as a tutor for Samuel Linbek's nephew. Having bonded over their Narodnik worldview, Augustina Sinkevich and Orest Gabel got married in 1875. In the same year, they set off to Bosnia and Herzegovina to participate in the anti-Ottoman uprising, but they did not stay there for long.

In Saint Petersburg, Augustina Gabel joined the Narodnik circle organised by her husband, whose members were preparing the escape of Narodniks Sergei Kovalik and Porfiry Voinaralsky from the pre-trial detention centre in the city. At the suggestion of the circle member Grigori Machtet, on 15 August 1876, Gabel, Nadezhda Bantle and Alexander Klushin took compromising materials from the apartment of the recently arrested Yevhenia Bartoshevich. That day, Augustina was searched and arrested. From 25 September to 2 October 1876, she was detained in the Peter and Paul Fortress, and then in the hospital of the Lithuanian Castle, a prison castle in Saint Petersburg. There, in December, she gave birth to her first child, a daughter named Ludmila. Augustina was interrogated on charges of "having relations with those held in the pre-trial detention centre with a view to their release" (Russian: в сношениях с содержавшимися в Доме предварительного заключения с целью их освобождения). She spent a total of four and a half months in custody. Augustina Gabel's case was closed administratively by the Supreme Command on 2 October 1877. The period of her imprisonment took into account her previous detention. Gabel was placed under police supervision.

In mid-June 1878, she voluntarily went into exile with her husband to Eastern Siberia, having previously obtained permission from Alexander Timashev, the Minister of the Interior. She lived with her husband in Balagansk in the Irkutsk Governorate, managing the household. During their exile, three daughters were born to the couple: Elena, Valeria, and Maria. On 3 May 1882, Augustina Gabel was released from police supervision by the decision of the Special Council.

Ukrainian historian Olga Nikolayenko has noted certain parallels between Augustyna Gabel and Valeria Bilokonska, who led the Kharkiv branch of the Society for Mutual Aid of Working Women. Both women experienced imprisonment and long-term exile, which played a significant role in shaping their lives and identities. According to the researcher, these experiences influenced their personal development and contributed to their search for purpose. Nikolayenko also highlights that the support of their devoted husbands, who shared their hardships, helped the women endure the challenges of exile and maintain focus on family life.

=== Librarian work ===
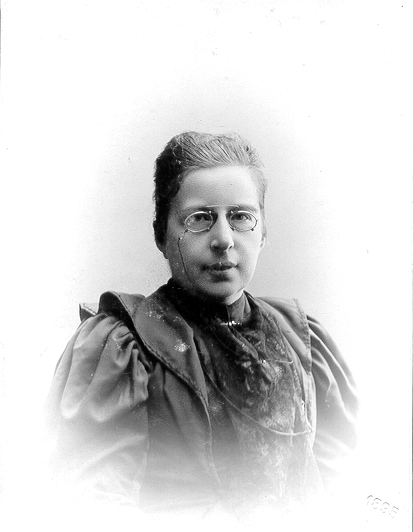
Photograph taken by Alfred Fedetsky in 1895

At the end of Orest Gabel's exile, he and Augustina left Siberia and arrived in Kharkiv in August 1887, where the couple were placed under secret surveillance. During their time in Kharkiv, the couple had two additional children, Yuri and Margarita. Augustina actively engaged in the cultural life of the city, and alongside her husband, contributed to the initiatives of the Kharkiv Society for the Promotion of Literacy among the People.

In 1890, she became a member of the Kharkiv Public Library and from 1893 to 1903, she worked in the library. She attended library members' meetings, worked at the circulation desk, and assisted readers in selecting books. When the question arose about the creation of library branches in industrial areas, Gabel was a member of the organising committee and actively participated in the opening of the first and second branches, including collecting donations. After the creation of the Branch Committee, which was responsible for the operation of the library branches, Gabel was elected its member, in which capacity she corresponded to various writers with the intention of including their books in the library collections. Among her correspondents were the writers Anton Chekhov and Leo Tolstoy. Her letter to Chekhov, sent in 1902, has been preserved and was included the catalogue of Evgeny Leitnecker. Researcher Sofia Sholomova indicated that there were many books by Chekhov in the catalog of the first branch office, and that some of them may have been sent by the author in response to Augustina's letter. The fact that all the daughters of the Augustina Gabel "dedicated themselves to librarianship and bibliography", according to Olga Nikolayenko, testified to the significant status of books and reading in the family.

Gabel died on 29 March 1907, in Kharkiv.

== Sources ==
- Chernova, M. V. [in Ukrainian] (31 October 1980). С автографом великого мастера [With the autograph of the great master]. Soviet Culture (in Russian) (88 (5408)). ISSN 1562-0379.
- Chernova, M. V. (26 July 1981). Дружина революціонера [The revolutionary's wife]. Ukraine (in Ukrainian) (30 (1278)). ISSN 0130-5212.
- Garbar, L. V.; Boryak, H. V.; Dubrovina, L. A.; Popyk, V. I., eds. (2017). Габель Августина Станіславівна [Gabel Augustina Stanislavivna]. Історія української бібліотечної справи в іменах (кінець XIX ст. — 1941 р.): матеріали до біобібліографічного словника [The history of Ukrainian librarianship in names (end of the 19th century — 1941): materials for a bio-bibliographic dictionary] (in Ukrainian). Kyiv: Natsionalʹna biblioteka Ukrayiny imeni V. I. Vernadsʹkoho. p. 616. ISBN 978-966-02-8536-1.
- Goff, I. A. [in Ukrainian] (2011). Подруги матери моей [Friends of my mother]. In Kaganov, M. I.; Kontorovich, V. M.; Frisman, L. G. (eds.). 25-ый подъезд [25th entrance] (PDF) (in Russian). Kharkiv. pp. 32–39.
- Leitnecker, Sostavitelʹ Yevgeny Yemiliyovich (1939). Архив А. П. Чехова: Аннотированное описание писем к А. П. Чехову [Archive of A.P. Chekhov: Annotated description of letters to A.P. Chekhov] (in Russian). Moscow, Russia: Sotsekgiz.
- Nikolaenko, O. O. (2017). Польські жінки Наддніпрянщини в другій половині XIX – на початку XX ст.: громадське і приватне життя [Polish women of the Dnieper region in the second half of the 19th and early 20th centuries: public and private life] (in Ukrainian). Kharkiv: Qualifying scientific work on manuscript rights. p. 479.
- Nikolaenko, O. O. (2023). Шляхи і долі польських жінок у громадсько-культурному житті Харкова на початку ХХ ст. [The paths and fates of Polish women in the social and cultural life of Kharkiv at the beginning of the 20th century.]. Scientific and Educational Elite and the Formation of the Intellectual Potential of the Ukrainian Nation: Materials of the Scientific Conference, Dedicated to the 95th Anniversary of the Birth of Dr. Of History, Prof. V. Ya. Bilotserkivsky, Kharkiv, March 29, 2023 (in Ukrainian). H.S. Skovoroda Kharkiv National Pedagogical University: 164–173.
- Nikipelova, N. A. (2011). «… У памяти в гостях…» или уроки Маргариты Орестовны ['... In memory of the guests...' or the lessons of Margarita Orestovna]. In Kaganov, M. I.; Kontorovich, V. M.; Frisman, L. G. (eds.). 25-ый подъезд [25th entrance] (in Russian). Kharkiv: Izrailiev Ye. M. pp. 17–22.
- Shalyganova, A. L. (2016). Правление Харьковской общественной библиотеки, 1885—1918: биобиблиог. словарь [Administration of the Kharkiv public library, 1885—1918: bio-bibliographical dictionary] (in Russian). Kharkiv: Fedorko. p. 328. ISBN 978-617-7298-43-3.
- Shilov, O. O. [in Ukrainian]; Karnaukhova, M. G., eds. (1932). Синькевич (Габель) Августина Станиславовна [Sinkevich (Gabel) Augustina Stanislavovna]. Деятели революционного движения в России: био-библиографический словарь [Figures of the revolutionary movement in Russia: bio-bibliographic dictionary] (in Russian). Vol. 2: The Seventies: Issue 4: S - I. Moscow: Society of Former Political Prisoners and Exiled Settlers.
- Sholomova, Sofiya Bohdanivna [in Ukrainian] (1986). Харківська громадська [Kharkiv public]. Fatherland (article) (in Ukrainian). No. 9. pp. 188–190.
- Telegina, S. V. (2020). Габель Августина Станіславівна [Gabel Avgustina Stanislavivna]. Library Encyclopedia of the Kharkiv Region (in Ukrainian). Kharkiv State Scientific Library named after V. G. Korolenko.
- Tunakova, K. S. (1972). Г. А. Мачтет и революционное движение 70-х годов [G. A. Machtet and revolutionary movement of the 70s]. Russian Literature and Liberation Movement (in Russian): 17–43.
- Vovk, O. I. (2016). Ілля Рєпін і Харківський університет [Ilya Repin and Kharkiv University]. V. N. Karazin Kharkiv National University Bulletin 'History of Ukraine. Ukrainian Studies: Historical and Philosophical Sciences' (in Ukrainian). 23: 132–137. ISSN 2524-2288.
- Двадцатипятилѣтіе Василеостровской женской гимназіи. 1858—1883 г. [Twenty-fifth anniversary of Vasileostrovskaya Girls' Gymnasium. 1858-1883]. Saint Petersburg: Printing house of V. Demakov. 1883. pp. 40, VIII.
