= Margarita Gabel =

Ukrainian literary critic and bibliographer

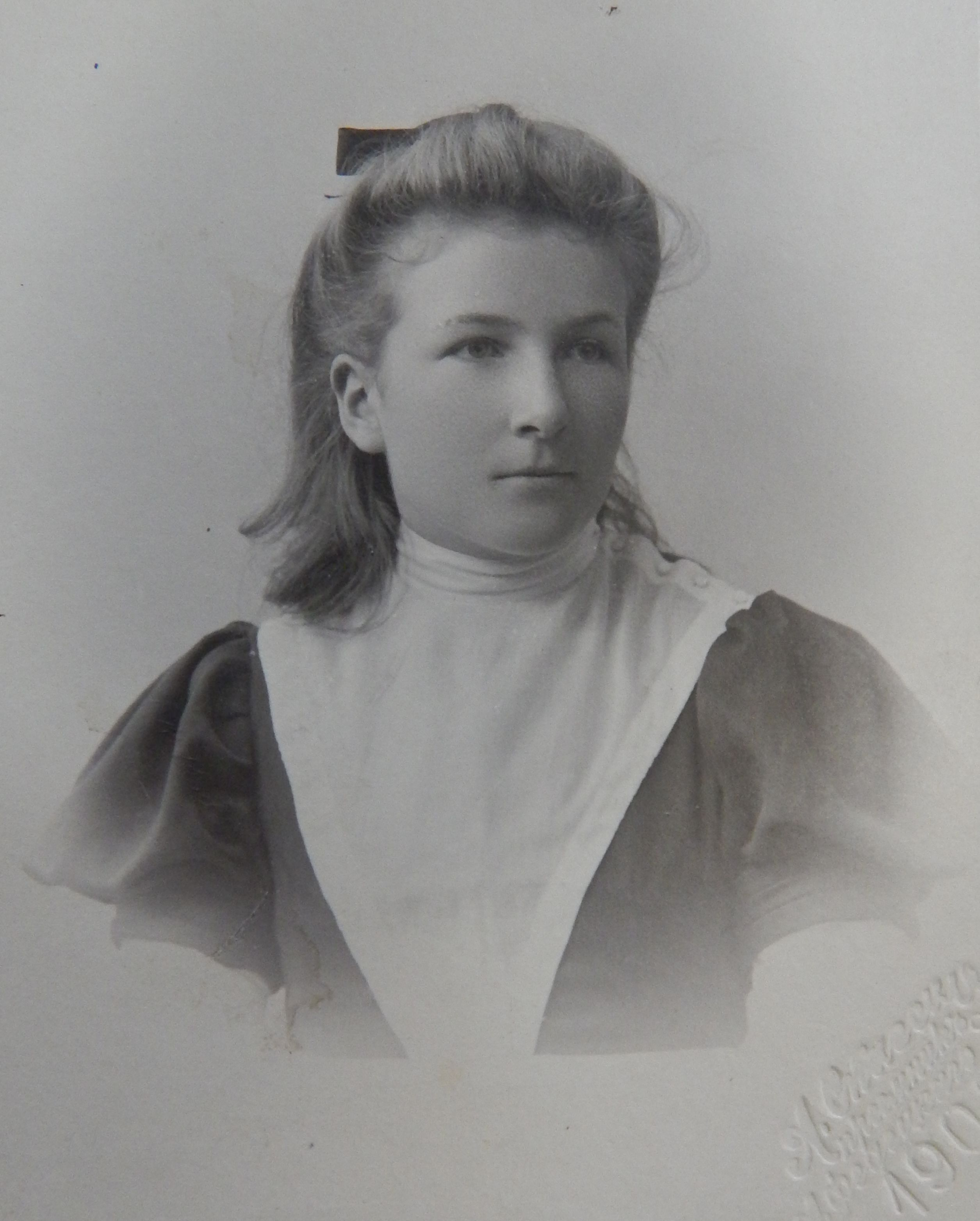
- Born: 13 November 1893; Kharkiv
- Died: 1981 (aged 87–88)
- Parents: Orest Gabel (father); Augustina Gabel (mother)

Academic background
- Thesis: Saltykov-Shchedrin's History of One City as an Anti-Nobility Satire

Academic work
- Discipline: library science literary criticism
- Institutions: Free Academy of Theoretical Knowledge; Kharkiv Institute of Popular Education; Kharkiv Institute of Vocational Education; National Academy of Educational Sciences of Ukraine; Kharkiv Korolenko State Scientific Library; Kharkiv Polytechnic Institute; N.G. Chernyshevsky State Library of the Kyrgyz SSR; V. P. Chkalov State Pedagogical University; Kharkiv State Library Institute

Signature
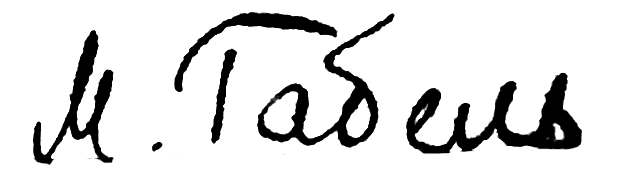

Margarita Orestovna Gabel (13 November 1893 – 1981) was a Ukrainian literary critic and bibliographer. She held a Candidate of Philological Sciences degree.

== Early life ==
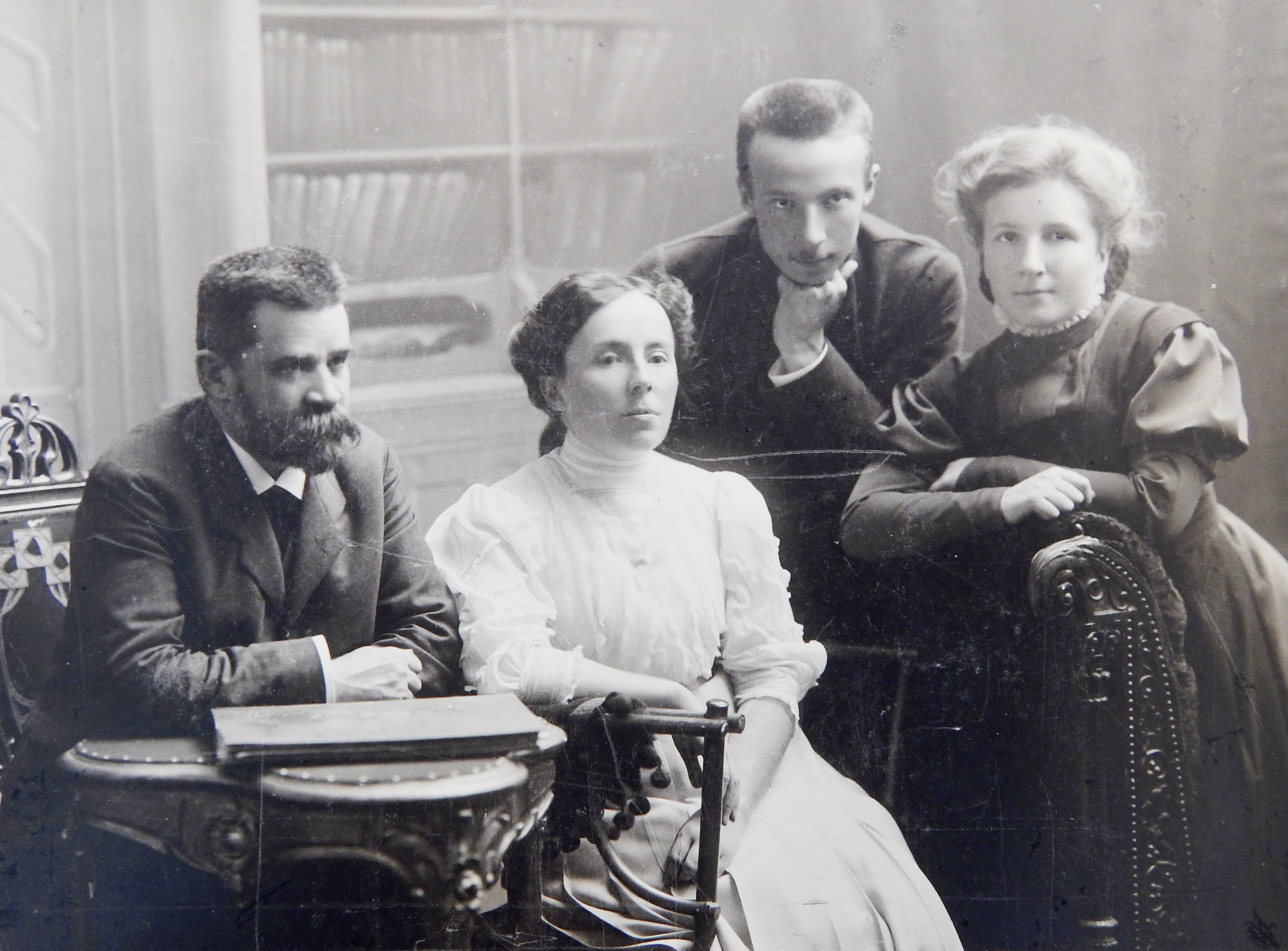
Margarita Gabel with her family. Also pictured: Margarita's brother-in-law Alexander Sitnikov, sister Elena, brother Yuri, and Margarita.

She was born on 13 November 1893 in Kharkov (Kharkiv). Her parents were revolutionaries associated with the Narodnik movement: Orest and Augustina Gabel. After serving their sentence in exile in Irkutsk Governorate, they moved to Kharkiv, where Orest Gabel soon became a member of the board of the Kharkiv Public Library. Margarita was the youngest child in the family, she had four sisters: Ludmila, Elena, Valeria, Maria, and a brother, Yuri, who later became a renowned chemist.

Margarita Gabel attended the private female gymnasiums of Pokrovsky and Ilyashev, from which she graduated in 1911. She continued her studies in the gymnasium for an additional eighth grade, which she completed the following year, receiving the title of home tutor. She continued her education at the Historical-Philological Faculty of the Kharkiv Higher Women's Courses. In 1916, she graduated from the historical department, and in 1919, from the philological department.

== Academic career, librarian work ==
From 1920, she worked at the newly established Free Academy of Theoretical Knowledge, and after its liquidation the following year, she moved to the Kharkiv Institute of Popular Education, where she worked as an assistant at the Department of Russian Literature History and simultaneously as a librarian at the Literature Cabinet. In 1922, she became a graduate student at the Department of European Culture at the institute. After completing her graduate studies in 1925, she began working as a research associate at two departments simultaneously—European culture and literature. She became a senior lecturer at the Department of Literature and taught the history of Russian and Western European literature. In 1929, she became an associate professor at the Department of Russian Literature History. After the dissolution of the Kharkiv Institute of Popular Education in 1930, she worked as an associate professor at the Literature History Department of the Kharkiv Institute of Vocational Education until its dissolution in 1931. In the same year, she became the head of the bibliographic library of the Ukrainian Book Chamber, and from the following year—the head of the foreign enlightenment library of the Institute of Pedagogy at the National Academy of Educational Sciences of Ukraine.

In 1940, she gained her Candidate of Philological Sciences degree on the topic of "Saltykov-Shchedrin's History of One City as an Anti-Nobility Satire" under the supervision of Oleksandr Biletskyi.

From 1933, she worked at the Kharkiv Korolenko State Scientific Library as a consultant bibliographer. She was engaged in the compilation of a collection of rare publications as part of the newly formed bibliographic group. As a result of the work of this group, the Department of Rare Editions and Incunabula was founded in 1940, which was headed by Gabel.

In 1919-1923, she taught Russian language and literature at the workers' faculty at the Kharkiv Polytechnic Institute.

During the Second World War, she was forced to leave Kharkiv and was evacuated to the Kyrgyz SSR, where from 1942 until 1943 she worked as a bibliographer in the N.G. Chernyshevsky State Library of the Kyrgyz SSR in Frunze (Bishkek). She later moved to Chkalov (Orenburg), where until 1944 she worked at the V. P. Chkalov State Pedagogical University.

In 1949 she became an associate professor of the Department of Literature and Languages of the Kharkiv State Library Institute. She worked there until her retirement in 1963.

== Death and legacy ==
She was buried at City Cemetery no. 2. In 1998, her shared grave with her brother Yuri was destroyed. It was later restored by the efforts of the public.

== Sources ==
- Losiyevsky, I. Ya. (2003), "The Department of Rare Publications and Manuscripts of the V. G. Korolenko Kharkiv State Scientific Library: History and Modernity", Collections of Written and Printed Monuments in Library Funds of Ukraine: Problems of Formation, Preservation, Disclosure. Materials of the Scientific and Practical Conference dedicated to the 100th anniversary of the Department of Rare Publications and Manuscripts of the V.G. Korolenko Kharkiv State Scientific Library, Kharkiv, pp. 24–49, archived from the original on 2009-04-01
- Losiyevsky, I. Ya. (2011), "Activities of the Bibliographic Group of the V. G. Korolenko Kharkiv State Scientific Library in 1934-1949 ("Gabel Period")", From the XIX to the XXI Century: Transformation of Libraries in the Context of Society Development: Materials of the International Scientific and Practical Conference, Kharkiv, October 12–14, 2011, Kharkiv, pp. 101–107
- Losiyevsky, I. Ya. (26 September 1998), "Ordinary Blasphemy", Evening Kharkiv (in Russian), no. 111 (7874)
- Sholomova, S. B. (1986), "Kharkivska Hromadska", Vitchyzna, no. 9, pp. 188–190
- Goff I. Friends of my Mother. Margarita Orestivna [Gabel] // October.— 1988.— No. 7.— P. 145—148.
- Raskina T. S. Strokes to the Portrait of M.O. Gabel // Culture of Ukraine.— Kharkiv, 1994.— Issue 2.— P. 143—155.
- History of Ukrainian Library Affairs in Names (late 19th century – 1941): Materials for a Bio-Bibliographical Dictionary / aut.-comp. L.V. Harbar; ed. by L.A. Dubrovina; NAS of Ukraine, Vernadsky National Library of Ukraine, Institute of Manuscripts. – Kyiv: NBUV, 2017. – P. 89. http://irbis-nbuv.gov.ua/everlib/item/er-0002146
- Utro (9 June 1911), Graduation Exams at Pokrovsky Women's Gymnasium (in Russian), Kharkiv, p. 5
- Utro (10 June 1912), In the Pokrovsky and Ilyashev Women's Gymnasium (in Russian), Kharkiv, p. 6
- S. V. Telegina (2020), "Augustina Stanislavivna Gabel", Bibliographic Encyclopedia of Kharkiv Region, V. G. Korolenko Kharkiv State Scientific Library
- Losiyevsky, I. Ya. (2020), "Margarita Orestivna Gabel", Bibliographic Encyclopedia of Kharkiv Region, V. G. Korolenko Kharkiv State Scientific Library
- Obituary (1951), "Yuri Orestovich Gabel: Obituary", Scholarly Notes of Kharkiv University (journal) (in Russian), pp. 5–7
- S. B. Glybicka; O. S. Zhuravlyova; S. R. Marchenko; Yu. Yu. Polyakova (2019), "Margarita Orestivna Gabel", Bio-bibliographical dictionary of scholars of Kharkiv University, vol. 3. Philologists. XX – early XXI century. Issue 1. Philological Faculty. Department of Ukrainian Studies of the Philosophical Faculty: Philologists. Historians (addition to vol. 2. Historians), p. 1280
