= Nikolskoye, Ust-Kubinsky District, Vologda Oblast =

Nikolskoye Никольское
- Selo
- Location within Vologda Oblast Location within Russia
- Coordinates: 59°50′N 39°22′E
- Country: Russia
- Region: Vologda Oblast
- District: Ust-Kubinsky District
- Time zone: UTC+3:00

Nikolskoye (Russian: Никольское) is a rural locality (a selo) and the administrative center of Nikolskoye Rural Settlement, Ust-Kubinsky District, Vologda Oblast, Russia. The population was 451 as of 2002. There are 8 streets.

From 1885 to 1933, the local hospital was run by the Belarusian physician Nadezhda Bantle, who according to locals reformed it into the most advanced hospital in the region.

== Geography ==
The distance to Ustye is 33 km. Filenskoye is the nearest rural locality.
