= Gables =

Gables may refer to:

- Gable, a portion of a wall between the edges of intersecting roof pitches
- Gables, Nebraska, an unincorporated community in the United States
- Gables, New South Wales, a suburb of Sydney, Australia
- Ken Gables (1919-1960), Major League Baseball pitcher

== See also ==
- Gable (disambiguation)
- The Gables (disambiguation)
