= Yuri Gabel =

Soviet Ukrainian scientist (1891–1949)

Ukrainian: Юрій Орестович Габель; English: Yuri Orestovich Gabel
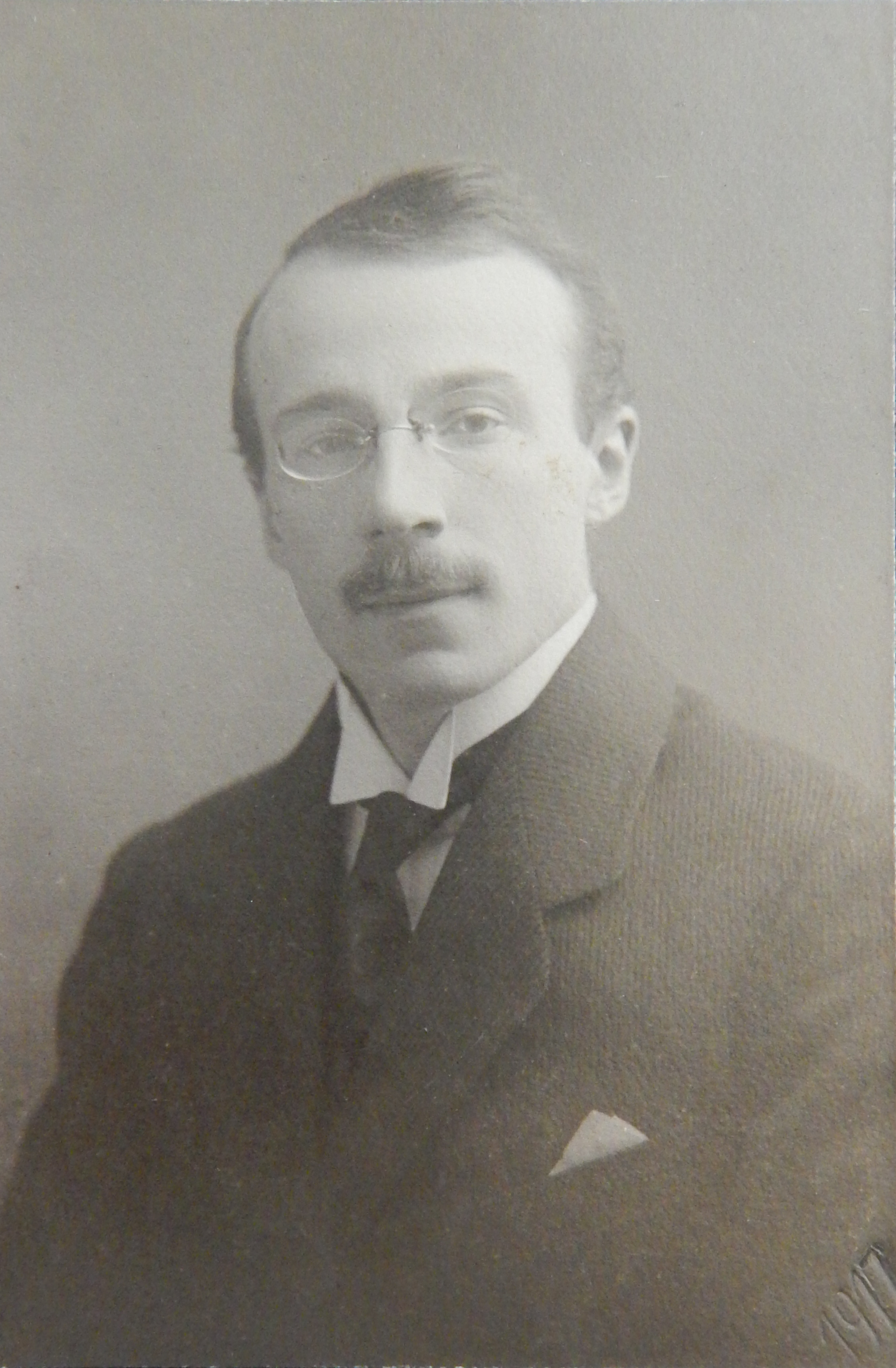
- Gabel in 1917
- Born: 11 December 1861
- Education: Imperial Kharkiv University
- Parents: Orest Gabel (father); Augustina Gabel (mother)
- Scientific career
- Fields: Organic chemistry
- Workplaces: Kharkiv State University; Kharkiv Medical Institute
- Doctoral advisor: Konstantin Krasusky

Yuri (Georgiy) Orestovich Gabel (Ukrainian: Юрій (Георгій) Орестович Габель; 11 December 1891, Kharkiv, Russian Empire — 23 March 1949, Kharkiv, USSR) was a Soviet Ukrainian scientist, chemist, Doctor of Chemical Sciences (1940), and Professor (1934). He was the Dean of the Faculty of Chemistry at Kharkiv State University from 1931 to 1935 and the Director of the Institute of Chemistry at Kharkiv State University from 1945 to 1949. Author of the first textbook on heterocyclic compounds, he was the founder and head of the first and only Department of Heterocyclic Compounds in the USSR, as well as the head of the Department of Organic Chemistry at Kharkiv Medical Institute.

== Biography ==
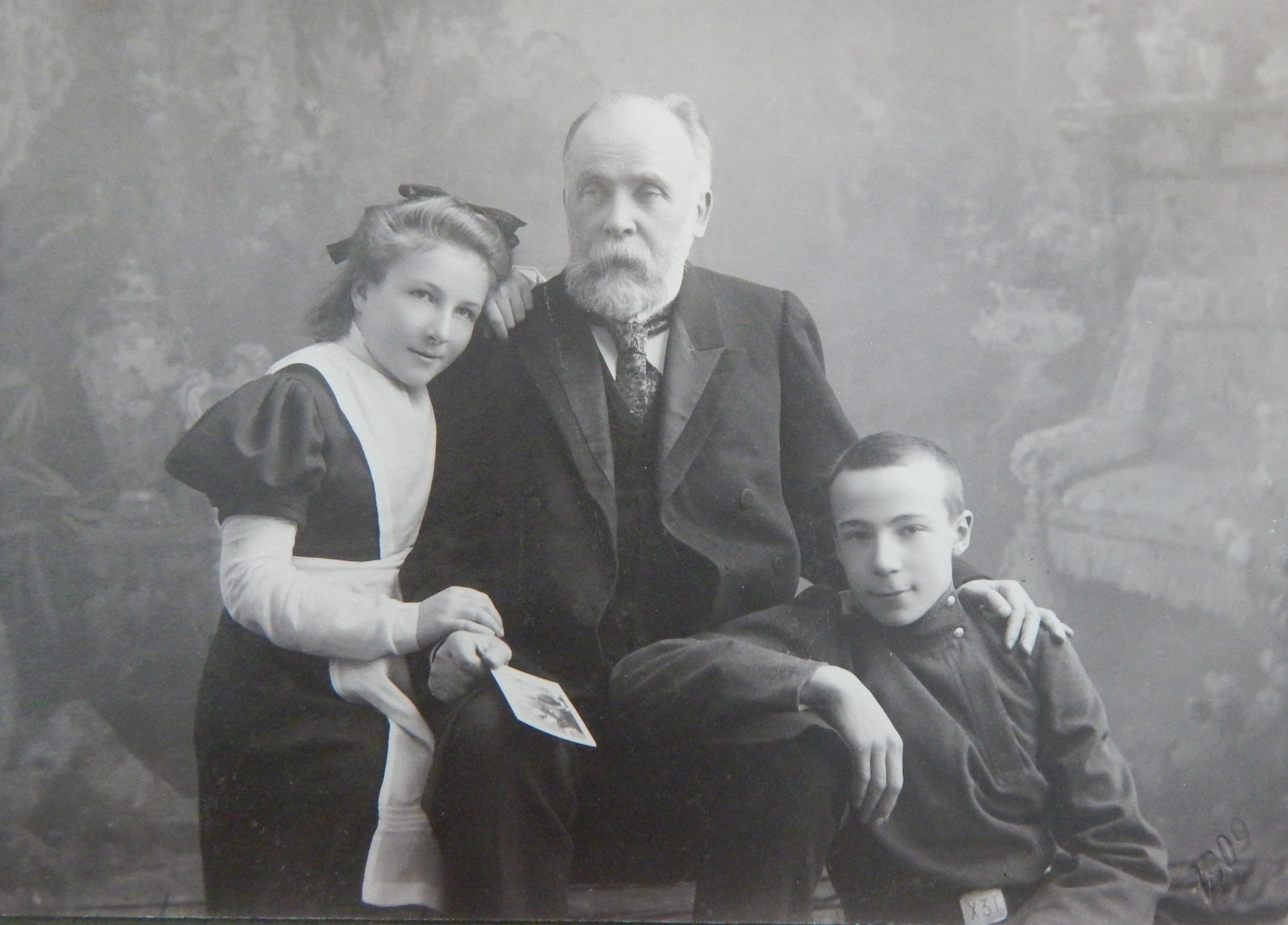
Gymnasium student Yuri Gabel with his father Orest and sister Margarita. 1909

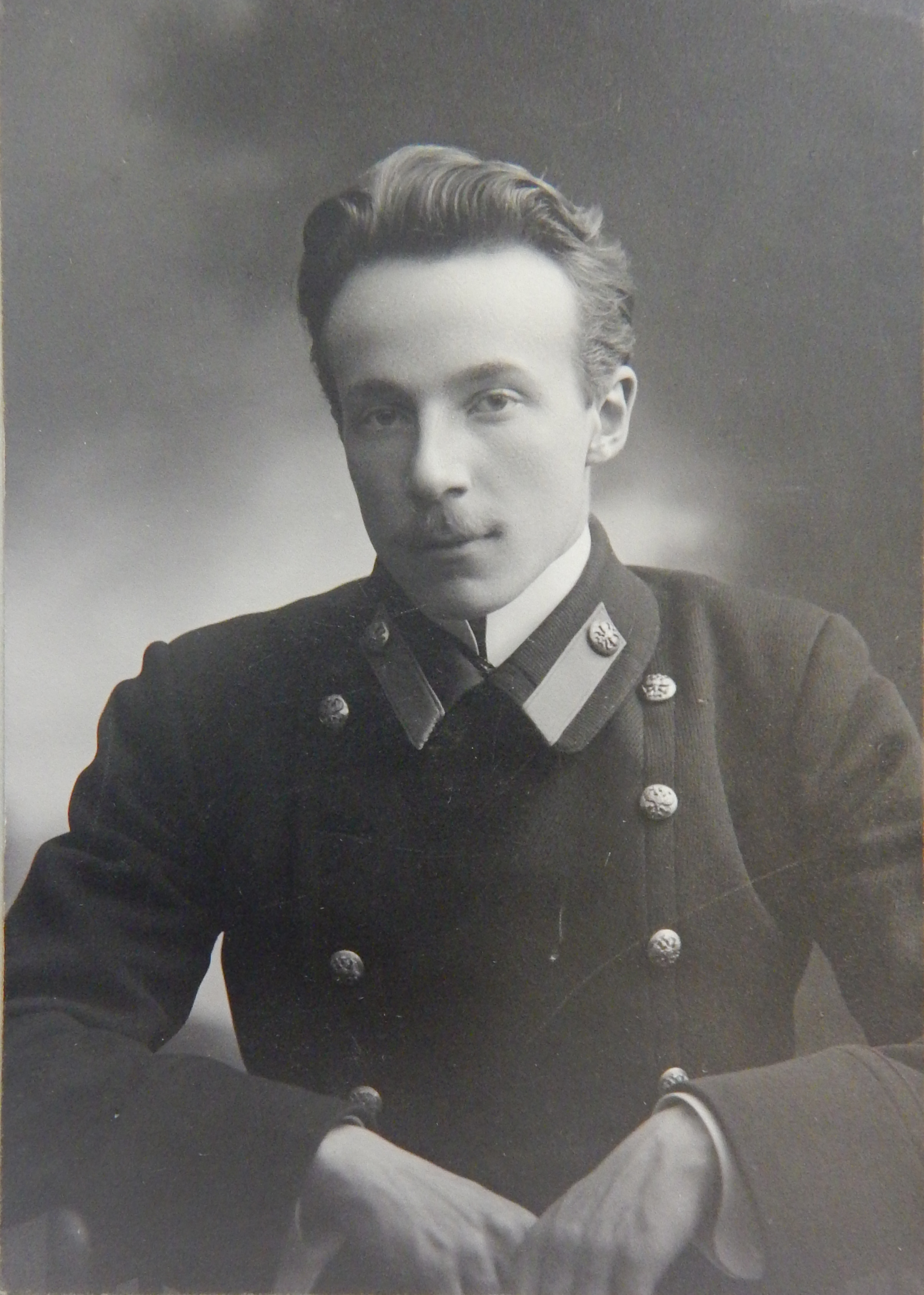
Yuri Gabel as a student of Kharkiv University

Yuri Gabel was born on 11 December 1891 in Kharkiv. His parents were revolutionary Narodniks Orest-Octavian Martynovich Gabel and Augustina Stanislavovna Sinkevich, who, after serving their exile in the Irkutsk Governorate, moved to Kharkiv, where Orest Gabel soon joined the board of the Kharkiv Public Library. Yuri had five sisters: Ludmila, Elena, Valeria, Maria, and Margarita. The youngest, Margarita, later became a well-known literary critic and researcher of the works of Ivan Turgenev.

In 1910, Yuri graduated with a gold medal from the Third Kharkiv Gymnasium. Another gold medallist from the gymnasium that year was Valery Mezhlauk. Yuri Gabel continued his studies in the Chemistry Department of the Faculty of Physics and Mathematics at Imperial Kharkiv University, graduating in 1914 with a first-class degree. He began working in the chemical laboratory of the Southern Railways. In 1915, he defended his thesis on "The Effect of Light on the Electrical Conductivity of Iodine Mercury in Acetone" and was awarded the degree of Master of Science. In the fall of the same year, he was retained for two years without a scholarship in the Department of Organic Chemistry at the university to prepare for a professorship. At the same time, he was involved in public activities and in 1918 was elected as a candidate for the board of the Kharkiv Public Library.

He served as a lecture assistant to Professor Konstantin Krasusky. From 1923, he worked at the Institute of Applied Chemistry, where, at the suggestion of the institute's director Ivan Krasusky, he researched the dry distillation of tobacco alongside G. I. Kiprianov. Independently, but concurrently with Aleksandr Shmuk, they established the correlation between the quality of tobacco and the alkalinity of tobacco smoke. Eventually, Gabel headed the tobacco research laboratory. His scientific work at the institute focused on the chemical composition of tobacco. This research resulted in several scientific articles and the pamphlet "Chemistry of Tobacco" (1931). He taught at the Kharkiv State Zooveterinary Academy and National Pharmaceutical University in Kharkiv, as well as at the coke-chemical and pharmaceutical technical schools, the Workers' Faculty and the industrial academy. In 1925, he held the position of editorial secretary for the newly-established Ukrainian Chemical Journal.

Gabel created the Faculty of Chemistry within the Kharkiv Institute of Physics and Chemistry. In 1931, he became the second dean of the faculty, succeeding Aleksandr Davydov. He held this position until 1935, during which the faculty became part of the new Kharkiv State University.

As of 1932, he was also a professor at the Ukrainian Polygraphic Institute. On December 29, 1932, he participated in a meeting on the "issue of disinfestation of archival materials" organized by the Central Archival Administration.

In 1934, Gabel received the academic title of professor and the degree of Candidate of Sciences. Among the first scientists of the Faculty of Chemistry, along with Andrey Kiprianov, he defended his doctoral dissertation on 27 November 1940, before the Council of Kharkiv State University named after A. M. Gorky. The topic of his doctoral dissertation was "The Chemistry of Barbituric Acid." He was confirmed as a Doctor of Chemical Sciences by the decision of the Higher Attestation Commission of the All-Union Committee for Higher Education under the Council of People's Commissars of the USSR on 1 February 1941.

At the same time, since 1930, he worked at the Kharkiv Medical Institute, where he served as the head of the Department of Organic Chemistry from 1931 to 1945, and later as a professor. According to another record, he headed the department until 1949. It was noted that at the medical institute, Yuri Gabel managed not only to organize high-level teaching but also to establish scientific work in the department. He also taught a course in organic chemistry at the biological faculty of Kharkiv University.

During World War II, he was evacuated to Orenburg (then known as Chkalov) along with other scientists from the Kharkiv Medical Institute. There, he could not continue his previous scientific research and had to study a toxic substance found in over-wintered millet. The results of this research were published in the Proceedings of the Chkalov Regional Institute of Epidemiology and Microbiology named after I. I. Mechnikov. He was also a member of the scientific and technical committee at the Chkalov Regional Executive Committee during the evacuation. While in Chkalov, Gabel wrote a poem titled "To Kharkiv", dated 22 May 1942.

For several years, Gabel led the synthetic department of the Scientific Research Institute of Experimental Pharmacy. From 1944 to 1949, he headed the Institute of Chemistry at Kharkiv University. As director, he focused on reorganising the institute and its post-war reconstruction. In 1946, he served as an opponent at the defence of Boris Krasovitsky's candidate dissertation.

In addition to his scientific endeavours, Gabel was actively involved in public work. For many years, he was a member of the presidium of the Kharkiv branch of the D. I. Mendeleev All-Union Chemical Society, supported the Dobrokhim and Osoaviakhim societies, and chaired the Bureau of the Scientific Workers' Section at Kharkiv University. He participated in the activities of the Kharkiv Medical Society, where he introduced society members to new medical drugs and their chemical properties in his reports. He also worked on the production of pharmaceutical preparations organised by the society.

After returning from vacation in the fall of 1948, Gabel felt unwell, coughing and complaining of pain in his side. He was diagnosed with lung cancer. He was treated in Moscow, where he underwent radiotherapy at an oncology clinic. Gabel died on March 23, 1949, and was buried in April of that year at the Second Kharkiv City Cemetery in the presence of colleagues. In 1998, his joint grave with his sister Margarita was destroyed and later restored by public efforts.

== Scientific activity ==
Under the guidance of Krasovsky, Gabel engaged in the traditional study of α-oxide reactions for Kharkiv chemists. Specifically, he investigated the products of condensation of organic α-oxides with amines.

Later, he studied barbituric acid derivatives in chemistry, examining the relationship between their structure and physiological activity. He wrote a monograph on this topic, which became his doctoral dissertation. He defended his dissertation in 1940. Later, he began studying sulfanilamides. Gabel synthesised sulfathiazole in his laboratory following its introduction as a replacement for sulfadiazine. It was the first synthesis of this compound in the Soviet Union and was supplied to the children's clinic, where it was used to treat pneumonia in children.

His work at the Kharkiv Medical Institute prompted him to study physiologically active substances, primarily heterocyclic compounds. He developed a special course for organic chemists in this field. In 1941, he authored a textbook, "Heterocyclic Compounds". This publication was the first attempt to write a textbook on this subject. As noted by Alexey Kost, due to the little-studied nature of the topic, Gabel "did not have the opportunity to provide material on a general basis". Gabel's successful work in this area of chemistry led to the creation of the first and only department of heterocyclic compounds in the USSR at Kharkiv University in 1945. Gabel headed the newly established department and remained its head until his death, after which the department was disbanded and the staff transferred to the Institute of Chemistry.

In the last years of his life, he became interested in antibiotics. From 1947, he worked on creating synthetic analogues of penicillin. The following year, his review article "Chemistry of Antibiotic Substances" was published in Russian Chemical Reviews. This article presented for the first time a chemical classification of antibiotics.

Gabel believed that many issues faced by biologists, doctors, and chemists could only be overcome through joint efforts. Therefore, during his directorship at the Institute of Chemistry, a large seminar was held, which included not only purely chemical reports but also presentations that combined chemistry with biochemistry, pharmacology, and medicine. The seminar addressed topics such as the mechanism of action of physiologically active compounds, the fate of drugs in the body, and the relationship between the structure of a drug and its physico-chemical properties and physiological activity. The seminar was very popular and was attended by scientists from many higher education institutions and research institutes in Kharkiv.

In teaching chemistry, he placed great emphasis on lecture assistance. Based on his work as an assistant to Konstantin Krasovsky, he prepared the "Guide to Lecture Demonstrations in Organic Chemistry" (1929). Later, he compiled his "Pedagogical Testament", which consists of brief notes for teachers. Researcher Oksana Nakonechnaya noted that these remarks remained relevant even in the early 21st century.

== Personality ==
Former student of Yuri Gabel, scientist Vitaliy Ronin, characterized his teacher in his memoirs: "a gifted person, an excellent specialist in his field, he was a remarkable lecturer." He considered Yuri Orestovich to be among the teachers who had the greatest influence on him. The death of his teacher greatly shook Ronin, who frequently visited his grave.

Colleague Boris Krasovitsky wrote about him in his memoirs: "Yuri Orestovich—always cheerful and joyful, with a sense of humor, somewhat frivolous, and very popular with women—took everything he could from life. He worked successfully in science, seemingly without much effort, and his pedagogical talent contributed to his popularity as a lecturer. Yuri Orestovich was always a welcome guest at all gatherings".

Yuri Gabel was close to his colleague Andrey Kiprianov, with whom he became friends during their joint work under Konstantin Krasovsky. Boris Krasovitsky noted that the friends were complete opposites: the cheerful and joyful Gabel and the serious, focused, and pedantic Kiprianov.

== Legacy ==
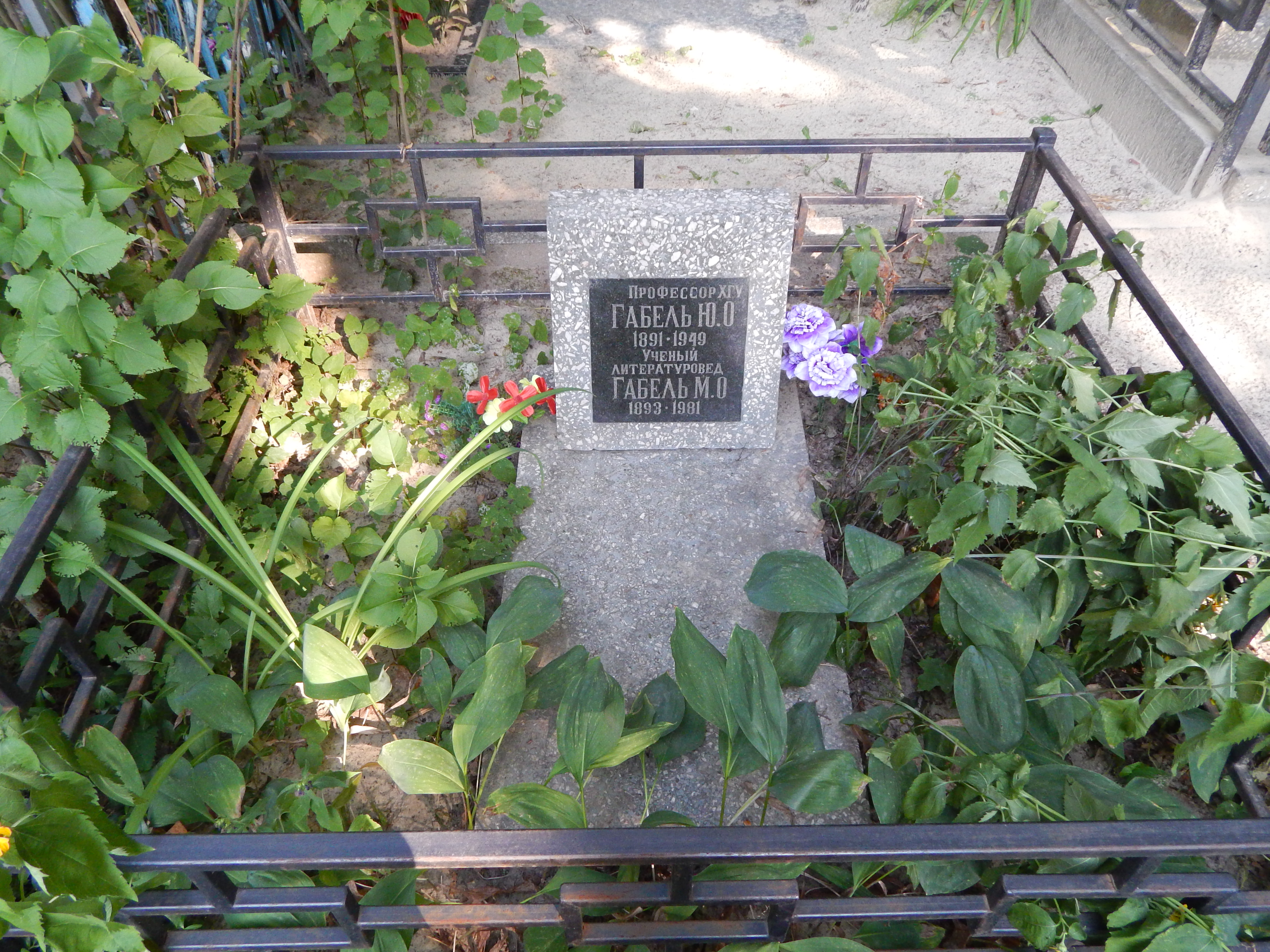
Grave of the scientist

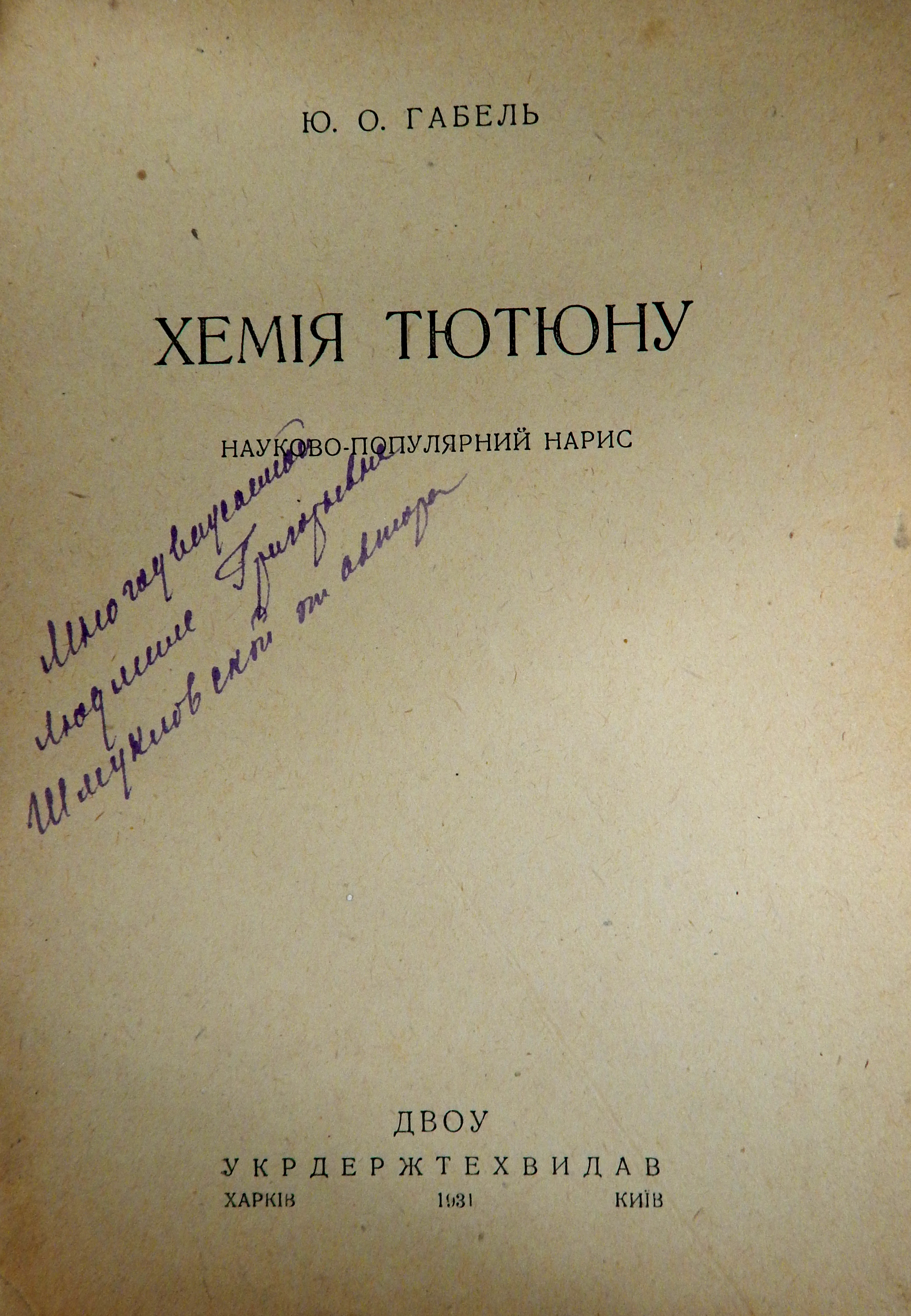
Title page of the brochure "Chemistry of Tobacco" with a dedication from the author

A photograph of Yuri Gabel and the text of his poem written in Chkalov are displayed on the right side glass of the fifth showcase at the Museum of Kharkiv National Medical University.

In the spring of 2014, the II Student Interfaculty Conference for Freshmen on Bioorganic Chemistry, dedicated to the 180th anniversary of the birth of D. I. Mendeleev and the 65th anniversary of the death of Y. O. Gabel, took place at Kharkiv National Medical University.

The grave of Yuri Gabel is maintained by the staff of the chemistry department and students of Kharkiv National Medical University. Funds from the department's staff were used to install a fence around the grave.

Gabel as a Professor of Chemistry is a secondary character in Viktor Domontovych's novel "Girl with a Teddy Bear".

== Bibliography ==
- Gabel Y. O.; Kyprianov H. I. (1930). Dry Distillation of Tobacco. Content of Pectin Substances in Tobacco. Kharkiv: Kharpoligraf.
- Domontovych V. (1928). The Girl with a Teddy Bear. News of Ukrainian Literature. Kyiv: Siaivo. p. 200.
- Kost, Alexey Nikolaevich (1963). Chemistry of Heterocyclic Compounds. Moscow: Foreign Literature Publishing House. p. 5–7.
- Krasovitsky, B. M. (1999). "Professor Yuri Orestovich Gabel". Bulletin of Kharkiv University. Chemistry. 4 (27) (454).
- Krasovitsky, B. M. (2004). My Teachers and Peers. Kharkiv: Folio. p. 244. ISBN 966-03-2622-X.
- Losievsky, Igor Yakovlevich (26 September 1998). "Ordinary Blasphemy". Evening Kharkov (newspaper) (111 (7874)).
- Mchedlov-Petrosyan, N. O. (2004). "Chemistry at Kharkiv University". Bulletin of Kharkiv University (in Russian). 11 (34) (626).
- Matiash, I. B. (2000). "Ukrainian archival science of the 1920s and 1930s: organization of natural history research". Archival and Document Studies Studios (in Ukrainian). 6: 14—21.
- Nakonechna, S. A. (2003). Scientists of Kharkiv State Medical University 1805 — 2005 (in Ukrainian). Kharkiv: PJSC Publishing House Kharkiv. p. 470. ISBN 966-7100-359.
- Pertseva, Zh. M. (2019). History of the Kharkiv Higher Medical School in the Expositions of the Museum of the History of KNMU (in Ukrainian). Kharkiv: KNMU. p. 216. ISBN 978-966-2094-42-8.
- Popova, L. P. (1960). "On the Composition of Tobacco Smoke from Different Drying Methods". Proceedings of Higher Educational Institutions. Food Technology (4): 35–39. ISSN 0579-3009.
- Ronin, V. S. (2015). "Memories of Studying at the Kharkiv Medical Institute (1947—1953)". In V. M. Lisovyi and Zh. M. Pertseva (ed.). History in Stories: The Kharkiv Higher Medical School in Memories, Documents, and Photographs (in Ukrainian). Kharkiv: KhNMU. pp. 221–225.
- Syrova, A. O.; Tishakova, T. S. (29 May 2014). "Conference — A Combination of Scientific, Educational, and Educational Work". Medichnyy Universytet. No. 11—12 (2887—2888).
- Telegina S. V. (2020), "Habel Augustyna Stanislavivna", Bibliotechna Entsyklopediya Kharkivshchyny (in Ukrainian), Kharkiv State Scientific Library named after V. G. Korolenko
- Chernykh, Valentin Petrovich (2015). 210 Years of Pharmaceutical Education: Traditions and Innovations. Materials of the Scientific and Practical Conference Kharkiv, November 27, 2015 (in Ukrainian). Kharkiv: NSMU. p. 190.
- Khotinsky, E. S.; Andreasov, L. M.; Izmailov, N. A.; Davydov A. T.; Shpeyer L. F.; Shafershteyn I. Y.; Gluzman M. Kh.; Simon I. B. (1950). "Yu. O. Gabel". Medical Affairs (journal) (5).
- Lisovyi, V. M.; Pertseva, Zh. M., eds. (2015). By the Mouths of Memories and Remembrance (in Ukrainian) (II ed.). Kharkiv: KNMU. p. 184.
- "Graduation of Gymnasts". Morning. No. 1910. 8 June 1910.
- "Meeting of the University Professors' Council". Southern Region. No. 12914. 5 September 1915.
- H. O. Syrova, ed. (2020). Department of Chemistry through the Eyes of Contemporaries (Historical Sketch) (in Ukrainian). Kharkiv: Planeta-Print. p. 240. ISBN 978-617-7751-48-8.
- "On the Approval of Academic Degrees and Titles". Herald of Higher Education (7). 1941.
- "Yuri Orestovich Gabel: Obituary". Proceedings of Kharkiv University. 38: 5–7. 1951.
