= Joseph Gabel =

French philosopher and sociologist

Joseph Gabel (12 July 1912 in Budapest – 15 June 2004 in Paris) was a French Hungarian-born sociologist and philosopher. His work was always strongly influenced by Marxism; he was against Stalinism and critical of the work of Louis Althusser.

== Biography ==
He left Hungary because of a Numerus Clausus for Jewish citizens and first studied Psychopathology with Eugène Minkowski, then he turned to Sociology (he was mainly influenced by Karl Mannheim and Georg Lukács). He taught at the Mohammed-V University of Rabat from 1965 to 1971, and at Amiens University from 1971 to 1980.

In 1962, he published his most important work: False Consciousness: An Essay on Reification. From the standpoint of psychopathology, this study works to synthesize Marxist notions of "false consciousness" and reification with the study of schizophrenia. In the following years, Gabel's works stressed the analysis of ideologies and marxist theory of alienation (The Sociology of Alienation, 1971; Idéologies 1974 - 1978; Alienation Today, 1974). Gabel also wrote the articles "Utopia" and "Ideology" in the Encyclopedia Universalis and he was one of the only French specialists on Karl Mannheim.

== Publications in French ==
- (in French) Génie et folie chez Guy de Maupassant, Paris, Jouve, 1940 (Thesis, Paris. Doctorat d'Université. 1940, no 117)
- (in French) La Fausse Conscience : essai sur la réification, Paris, Éditions de Minuit, « Arguments », 1962.
- (in French) Sociologie de l'aliénation, Paris, PUF, « Bibliothèque de sociologie contemporaine », 1971.
- (in French) L'Aliénation aujourd'hui, Paris, Anthropos, 1974.
- (in French) Idéologies 1 (Articles, 1948–1972), Paris, Éditions Anthropos, 1974.
- (in French) Idéologies. 2, Althussérisme et stalinisme, (Articles and conferences), Paris, Éditions Anthropos, 1978. ISBN 978-2-7157-0320-9
- (in French) (dir.), with Bernard Rousset, Trinh Van Thao and al., Actualité de la dialectique, Colloque du Centre universitaire de recherche sociologique d'Amiens, Chantilly, septembre 1977; Paris, Éditions Anthropos, 1980. ISBN 2-7157-1003-8
- (in French) Mannheim et le marxisme hongrois, Paris, Méridiens-Klincksieck, « Sociétés », 1987. ISBN 2-86563-177-X
- (in French) Réflexions sur l'avenir des juifs : racisme et aliénation, Paris, Méridiens-Klincksieck, 1987. ISBN 2-86563-187-7
- (in French) Études dialectiques, Paris, Méridiens-Klincksieck, 1990. ISBN 2-86563-267-9
- (in French) Mensonge et maladie mentale, Paris, Éditions Allia, 1995. ISBN 2-904235-96-5
- (in French)"Communisme et dialectique". In: Revue Les Lettres Nouvelles, 6eme année, Avril 1958, n° 59.
- (in French)"La crise du marxisme et la psychologie". In: Revue Arguments. Revue trimestrielle, Les Editions de Minuit, n° 18, 1960 theme l'homme probleme: anthropologie, marxisme, psychanalyse.
- (in French)"Sur Marxisme, anarchisme, psychologie sociale". In: Revue Arguments. Revue trimestrielle, Les Editions de Minuit, numéro 25–26, 1er et 2e trimestres 1962, theme la question politique (I).
- (in French)"Valeur clinique du test de Szondi". Psyché (Paris), Revue Internationale des Sciences de l'Homme et de la Psychanalyse, 1951.
- (in French)"Racisme et Aliénation,” in Praxis International, Vol. II, No. 4, January, 1983.

== Publications in English ==
- False consciousness : an essay on reification. Translated from the French by Margaret A. Thompson with the assistance of Kenneth A. Thompson; introduction by Kenneth A. Thompson. Oxford : Blackwell, 1975.
- Karl Mannheim and Hungarian Marxism. Translated by William M. Stein and James McCrate. New Brunswick, N.J.: Transaction Publishers, c1991.
- Ideologies and the corruption of thought (ed. & introd. by Alan Sica). New Brunswick: Transaction Publishers, 1997.
- "Hungarian Marxism." In: Telos, Number 25 (Fall 1975). Telos Press
- "Utopian and False Consciousness." In: Telos, Number 29 (Fall 1976). Telos Press

== See also ==
- Gilles Deleuze, L'Anti-Œdipe Capitalisme et schizophrénie
- Schizoanalysis
