= Gable (surname) =

Gable is an English surname. Notable people with the surname include:

- Ashley Gable, American screenwriter and producer
- Bob Gable (1934–2024), American businessman and political candidate
- Brian Gable, Canadian cartoonist
- C. J. Gable, American football player
- Chad Gable (born 1986), ring name of American professional wrestler Charles Betts
- Christopher Gable, English dancer and actor
- Clark Gable (1901–1960), American actor
- Clark James Gable (1988–2019), American actor, also known as Clark Gable III, grandson of Clark Gable
- Dan Gable (born 1948), American freestyle wrestler and wrestling coach
- Ellen Gable, American author
- Eric Gable, American singer
- Gerry Gable (1937–2026), British activist
- Guitar Gable, American musician
- Howard Gable, Australian record producer
- Jeremy Gable, American playwright
- John Allen Gable, American historian
- June Gable, American actress
- Mark Gable, member of the Choirboys

== See also ==
- Gable
