= Ellen Gable =

American author of Catholic fiction (born 1959)

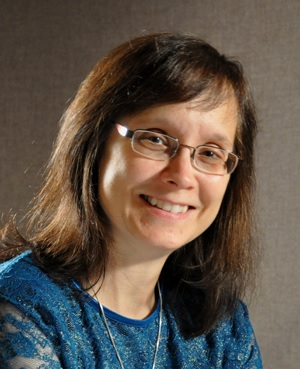
- Born: May 5, 1959 (age 67); Camden, New Jersey, U.S.
- Occupation: Author
- Spouse: James Hrkach (m. 1982)
- Writing career
- Genre: Catholic fiction

Ellen Gable (born May 5, 1959) is an American author of Catholic fiction.

Gable, who publishes under her maiden name, was born in Camden, New Jersey, and is a native of the Philadelphia, Pennsylvania area who moved to Arnprior, Ontario after marrying Canadian artist, musician and arts educator James Hrkach in 1982.

Her debut novel, Emily's Hope, won an Honorable Mention Award in Religious Fiction in the 2006 Independent Publisher Book Awards. Her second novel, In Name Only, was released in 2009 and received the gold medal for Religious Fiction in the 2010 Independent Publisher Book Awards. In Name Only has been an Amazon Kindle #1 Bestseller. Her third novel, Stealing Jenny, was published in 2011. It also reached #1 on Amazon Kindle's Religious & Liturgical Drama category in November 2011 and June/July, 2012. Dancing on Friday, was published in 2013.

A Subtle Grace, was published in 2014. A sequel to In Name Only, it is set in 1896 in Philadelphia and tells of the romantic travails of the eldest daughter of a large Catholic family.

Her novels Julia's Gifts, Charlotte's Honor, and Ella's Promise, are part of the award-winning Great War Great Love series. Some of her books are available in French, Portuguese, Spanish, and Italian.

In 2018, her high school, Triton Regional High School in Runnemede, NJ, inducted her into the TRHS Alumni Hall of Fame.

Her book Where Angels Pass is based on the true story of her late father's abuse by a Catholic priest. It won First Place in the 2023 CMA Awards in Catholic Novels.

She is a freelance writer and has written for Family Foundations magazine, Ecclesia, Restoration and is a columnist for Amazing Catechists and Catholic Mom. She is also the former President of the Catholic Writers Guild.
