= The Gables, Gauteng =

The Gables
- Location within Gauteng Location within South Africa
- Coordinates: 26.206°S 28.118°E
- Country: South Africa
- Province: Gauteng
- Municipality: City of Johannesburg
- Time zone: UTC+2 (SAST)

The Gables is a suburb of Johannesburg, South Africa. It is located in Region F of the City of Johannesburg Metropolitan Municipality.
