= Ludmila Gabel =

Ukrainian librarian, public figure and lawyer

- Людмила Орестівна Габель
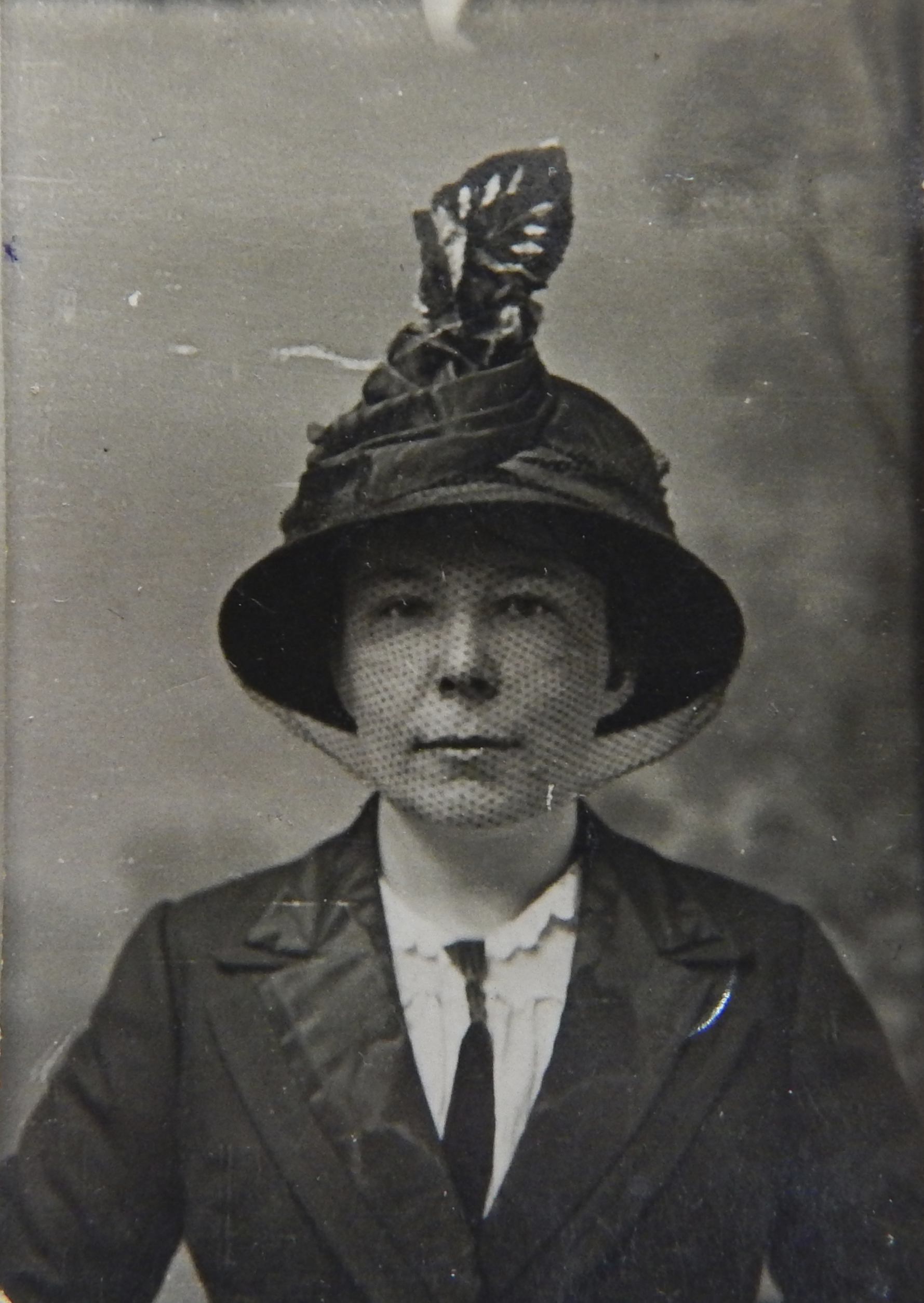
- Gabel at Pisochyn station
- Born: Ludmila Orestovna Gabel; December 1876; Saint Petersburg, Russian Empire
- Died: 10 April 1967 (aged 90); Kharkiv, Ukrainian SSR, Soviet Union
- Occupations: Librarian and lawyer

Ludmila Orestovna Gabel (Ukrainian: Людмила Орестівна Габель, romanized: Lyudmyla Orestivna Habel; 1876 – 10 April 1967) was a librarian, public figure and lawyer. She was born into a family of Narodnik revolutionaries, Orest and Augustina Gabel. She was a member of the Committee of Rural Libraries and the Book Commission of the Kharkiv Literacy Society. In 1887, after her father's exile ended, the family relocated to Kharkiv, where Ludmila pursued her education. She graduated from the second women's gymnasium in Kharkiv, earning the title of home tutor.

Her revolutionary fervour was evident from a young age, leading to her arrest in 1901 for suspected involvement with the Kharkiv Socialist Revolutionaries. Despite being released due to a lack of incriminating evidence, Ludmila remained under special surveillance. In 1904, she made a significant stride in her academic career by becoming one of the first women admitted to the Faculty of Law at Kharkiv University. She also organised the library at the Juvenile Court of Kharkiv. Her advocacy for women's education marked a pivotal moment in her early life and set the stage for her future contributions to both revolutionary and feminist movements in Kharkiv.

== Early life and education ==
Ludmila Orestovna Gabel was born in 1876, the first child in the family of Narodnik revolutionaries Orest Gabel and Augustina Gabel. In the year of Ludmila Orestovna's birth, Orest and Augustina had planned the prison escapes of Narodnik revolutionaries Sergei Kovalik and Porfiriy Voynaralsky. However, the plan was unsuccessful and its organisers were captured. At the time of her arrest, Augustina Stanislavovna was pregnant. After Ludmila's birth, her mother's condition worsened and they were transferred to a hospital. After some time, Ludmila was entrusted to her mother's older sister, Elena Limbek, with whom Ludmila spent the first months of her life. Half a year later, Augustina was released from prison, mainly due to Elena's acquaintance with influential official Anatoly Koni. Shortly thereafter, Ludmila's father was sentenced to exile to Western Siberia and Augustina went with him. In the summer of 1878, she left for Balagansk with Ludmila.

In 1887, her father's term of exile ended and the family moved to Kharkiv. Ludmila graduated from the second women's gymnasium in Kharkiv with the title of home tutor.

From her youth, Ludmila was passionate about revolutionary ideas. In 1901, she was arrested for suspected involvement with the Kharkiv group of Socialist Revolutionaries. A search was conducted, which did not reveal any prohibited revolutionary literature in Ludmila's possession. However, due to her connections with revolutionary figures in the capital, she was taken to Saint Petersburg, where she pleaded guilty. Upon her return to Kharkiv, she was placed under special surveillance, which lasted from 5 June to 13 September 1901. Along with her sister Maria, she was a member of the combat unit of V.O. Talayev and participated in the political events of 1905.

In September 1904, she appealed to the curator of the Kharkiv educational district with a request to petition the Ministry of Education to allow her to attend lectures at the Faculty of Law of Kharkiv University. The request was approved and she, along with noblewoman Dombrovskaya, became the first women to study at the Faculty of Law of Kharkiv University.

== Career ==
Gabel became closely associated with the Kharkiv Public Library. She became a member of the library in 1894, carried out various work within the library and participated in defending the rights of the library's unpaid workers.

Gabel actively participated in the activities of the Committee for Arranging Rural Libraries of the Kharkiv Society for the Promotion of Literacy among the People. From 1898, she was a member and worker of this committee, as well as a member of its Book Commission. She helped open new libraries within the Kharkiv Governorate, supplying them with books.

In the winter of 1907, by order of the governor-general, the Committee's book depository was sealed. At that time, it contained a lot of prohibited literature. Gabel entered and smuggled out the prohibited literature. The closure of the warehouse for six months and new restrictions on library work greatly complicated the Committee's work and in early 1910, it was closed. Gabel and other Committee members were arrested on charges of distributing revolutionary literature. On 8 March 1910, she was released from prison on bail of 3000 roubles. At that time, she was placed under unofficial surveillance, which lasted until 29 March 1912, when the committee members were acquitted due to a lack of evidence of their unlawful activities.

After being acquitted, Gabel actively joined the feminist movement in the city. Activists addressed issues related to the rights of women with higher education and established the Kharkiv branch of the League for Women's Equality, one of two in the Russian Empire at the time, located in Gabel's apartment.

On 16 November 1912, she was elected a member of the board of the newly established Kharkiv Society for Patronage of Minors, later serving as its secretary. In the spring of the following year, she volunteered as a guardian of the Juvenile Court. During the summer, she represented Kharkiv at the First International Congress on Child Protection in Brussels. In the autumn, she organised a library at the court chamber and facilitated festive events for juvenile prisoners. By mid-October 1913, she left the Juvenile Court and published several letters in Kharkiv newspapers exposing the inhumane treatment of children by court officials.

During the Soviet era, she worked at Ukoopspilka and Soyuzpredsprosi. In 1950, she wrote memoirs about the activities of the Committee for Rural Libraries of the Kharkiv Literacy Society, which received positive reviews from the Commission on the History of Library Affairs at the Institute of Theory and History of Pedagogy of the Academy of Pedagogical Sciences.

== Personal life ==
After the Second World War, she lived in the House of Specialists in the apartment of her younger sister Margarita.

Ludmila Orestovna Gabel died on 10 April 1967, in Kharkiv. Her place of burial is unknown.

There is conflicting information about Gabel's religious affiliation. Surveillance documents from 1901 describe her as Lutheran, while those from 1910 describe her as Catholic. Margarita wrote in her memoirs that the children in the family were raised as atheists.

== Bibliography ==
- Bohachevsky-Chomiak, Martha (2018). Білим по білому: Жінки у громадському житті України. 1884–1939 [White on White: Women in the Public Life of Ukraine, 1884–1939]. Lviv: Ukrainian Catholic University. ISBN 978-617-7637-05-8.
- Kizchenko, Valentina I. [in Ukrainian]; Tkachuk, A. P. (1985). "Діяльність Харківського товариства поширення в народі грамотності" [Activities of the Kharkiv Society for the Promotion of Literacy among the People]. Ukrainian Historical Journal: 81–87.
- Mamon, Viacheslav E. (2021). "Життєвий шлях бібліотекаря Людмили Габель" [Life path of librarian Ludmila Gabel]. Korolenko Readings 2020. "Libraries, Archives, Museums: Historical Experience and Current Trends in Development": Materials of the XXIII All-Ukrainian (with International Participation) Distance Sci.-Pract. Conf., Dedicated to the 190th Anniversary of the Founding of V. G. Korolenko HSL, Kharkiv, Oct. 22–23, 2020. Kharkiv: 244—251.
- Smolyar, Ludmila [in Ukrainian] (1998). Past for the Sake of the Future. Women's Movement in the Trans-Dnieper Ukraine, 2nd Half of the 19th - Early 20th Century: History Pages: Monograph. Odesa: Astroprent. p. 408. ISBN 966-549-087-7.
- Shalyganova, A. L. (2016). Administration of the Kharkiv Public Library, 1885–1918: Bio-Bibliographic Dictionary (in Russian). Kharkiv: Fedorko. p. 328. ISBN 978-617-7298-43-3.
- Sholomova, Sofia [in Ukrainian] (1986). "Kharkiv Public Society". Homeland (9): 188–190.
- Mykhailo Chubynsky; Dmytro Bahaliy, eds. (2007). The Faculty of Law of Kharkiv University for the First Hundred Years of Its Existence (1805–1905) (in Russian). Kharkiv: SAGA. pp. 15, VIII, 378 + 10 port. sheets. ISBN 978-966-2918-30-4.
