= Grigori Machtet =

Ukrainian writer

Grigori Alexandrovich Machtet
- Григорій Олександрович Мачтет
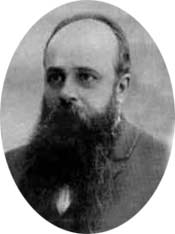
- Born: 15 September [O.S. 03 September] 1852; Lutsk
- Died: August 27, 1901 (aged 48); Yalta
- Known for: Writer, political activist
- Notable work: Tortured by Heavy Bondage (Russian: Замучен тяжелой неволей) (poem), 1876

Grigori Alexandrovich Machtet (Ukrainian: Мачтет Григорій Олександрович) (1852-1901) was a writer from the Russian Empire. He was also a revolutionary, poet, and journalist. He is known as the author of the well-known revolutionary song "Tormented by Heavy Bondage" (Russian: Замучен тяжёлой неволей).

== Early life ==
Early life

The Machtet family originally came from England.

Grigori Alexandrovich Machtet was born in Lutsk, a city in Western Ukraine. In 1865, he was allegedly expelled from fourth grade at the Nemirov Gymnasium for showing sympathy towards the participants in the Polish uprising of 1863. That same year, his father died, leaving him orphaned.

In 1870, he received permission to take an exam to become a teacher of history and geography in the district schools. He taught for two years at the schools in Mogilev and Kamianets-Podilskyi.

== Personal life ==
In 1880, Machtet married fellow political exile Yelena Petrovna Medvedeva, a participant in the infamous "Trial of the Fifty". Their son, Taras Machtet (1891-1938) became a poet and a member of the Luminist literary movement.

The family settled in Zaraysk and lived there until 1900. On December 3, 1961, a marble memorial plaque was installed on a house in Zaraysk with the inscription: “From 1891-1895 writer Grigory Aleksandrovich Machtet lived and worked in this house."

== Political activity ==
In 1872 Machtet left Russia for the United States with the intention of organizing agricultural communes there. The attempts made to found a commune were unsuccessful and Machtet returned to Russia in 1875, settling in Saint Petersburg.

In 1876 Machtet was imprisoned to the Peter and Paul Fortress where he spent a year in solitary confinement. He was then exiled to Siberia.

In 1900 he received permission to return to Saint Petersburg but died there shortly after.

== Works ==
Machtets works are characterized by their sharpness, humanism, and elements of melodrama. He began to write while in America, and published his poems in the Russian emigré newspaper "Svoboda" (Russian: Свобода). Upon returning to Russia, Machtet published essays about life in North America.

Published works

"A Man with a Plan" (1886)

At Dawn (1886)

One Warrior In The Field (1886)

"The Prodigal Son" (1887)

At Dawn (1893)
