= Olga Dmitrievna Bagalei-Tatarinova =

Ukrainian historian, archivist, bibliographer and librarian

Olga Dmytrivna Bagaliy-Tatarynova
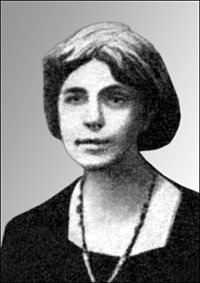
- Born: Olga Dmytrivna Bagaliy; 7 October 1890; Kharkiv, (now Ukraine)
- Died: 19 September 1942 (aged 51); Kharkiv
- Other name: Olga Dmytrivna
- Education: Higher Women's Courses
- Occupations: Historian, archivist, bibliographer, librarian
- Father: Dmytro Bahalii

Olga Dmytrivna Bagaliy-Tatarynova (1889–1942) (familiarly known as Olga Dmytrivna) was a Ukrainian historian, archivist, bibliographer and librarian. In the early 1920's, she became head of the Department of Ukrainian History at the Kharkiv Institute of Public Education. In 1942, while Kharkiv was held by German forces, the occupiers began a campaign to remove the cultural treasures of Ukraine, notably the "library campaign." But because she was part of the commission for cleaning (stealing) the collections of the University Library, she helped the library keep its collection of manuscripts, old prints and rare editions safe.

== Biography ==
She was born on 7 October 1890 in Kharkiv, (now Ukraine), as the daughter of Dmytro Bagaliy a professor at Kharkiv University and a historian who was also one of founding members of the National Academy of Sciences of Ukraine. Her mother was Maria, (née Oleksandrovych) and the couple had four children. Olga Dmytrivna was the second-oldest child.

In 1907, Olga, together with her sister older sister Natalia, graduated from the Kharkiv gymnasium, and she went on to complete her studies at the historical department of the historical and philological faculty of the Higher Women's Courses in Moscow, Russia (1914).

=== Researcher ===
The next year, at 18, Olga Dmytrivna was unanimously elected a member of the Kharkiv Public Library by direct ballot. In the same year, she completed a three-month librarians' course and began working as a bibliographer at the library. She went on to hold the positions of librarian in the reading room (1921–1922) and the consultation department. Later, in 1924, she became the deputy head of the consultation and bibliographic department and a research fellow at the library.

In 1920–1925, she was an assistant professor at the Department of Russian History, head of the Department of Ukrainian History at the Kharkiv Institute of Public Education. She taught courses in Russian historiography and the history of social movements in Russia.

In 1922–1927, she was an archivist (with a break) at the Kharkiv Historical Archive in the Korolenko Library. She organized, described, and discovered documents on the history of Freemasonry, the Decembrists in Sloboda Ukraine, and military settlements in Southern Ukraine in the first half of the 19th century.

During that same time, she was a postgraduate student, and from 1925 to 1933, she served as the secretary of the historical section and a researcher at the Kharkiv Research Department of the History of Ukrainian Culture (since 1930, the Institute) named after the academician Dmytro Bahaliy.

In May 1927, she was invited to visit the libraries of Paris, France, "for scientific purposes." The invitation came from the French Committee for Scientific Relations with Russia, and permitted her to work in the archives of the French Ministry of Foreign Affairs. "In addition to working in the archives on the topic of her dissertation, Olga Dmitrievna was assigned the task of familiarizing herself with the state of modern library work in the West." She described her research in a 1928 publication, Some Notes on the Archives of Paris.

In 1928–1929, she headed the Ukraine department, which was created by her father when he was the chairman of the board of the Kharkiv Public Library.

In 1930–1934, she was a freelance employee of the "Commission for the Study of the Socio-Economic History of Ukraine of the 18th–19th Centuries in Connection with the History of the Revolutionary Struggle," which was chaired by her father. After his death in 1932, she took on the job of describing and organizing his archives. She was also one of the organizers of the publication describing his creative heritage in 15 volumes, but the project was never completed.

=== Purge victim ===
In 1934–1935, she was a research associate at the Taras Shevchenko Institute, but after a campaign of "purges" in scientific institutions, Olga Dmytrivna lost her steady job so she worked as a freelance laboratory assistant at the Faculty of History of Kharkiv University. Then she worked as the leading bibliographer of the Central Scientific Library of Kharkiv University.

From 1936 to 1941, she collaborated with the Institute of Ukrainian Literature of the Academy of Sciences of the Ukrainian SSR. In 1941, Olga Dmytrivna finished her dissertation, but was unable to defend it due to the German occupation of the city. After the troops of Joseph Stalin fled Ukraine during the Great Patriotic War, during the Nazi occupation, she was enrolled in a group of historians and archivists of the Ukrainian Academy of Sciences, led by V.V. Miyakovsky, to write a history of archival affairs in Ukraine.

In 1941, Olga Dmytrivna finished her dissertation, but was unable to defend it due to the city's occupation by Germany. From the end of 1941 (after the evacuation of the university) until the end of her life, she held the position of deputy director for scientific work of the Central National Security Service. In 1942, she became a member of the commission tasked with cleaning (removing) the country's valuable library collections as part of the German campaign to seize Ukraine's cultural heritage. But, with her help, the university library was able to safeguard its collections of manuscripts, old prints and rare editions.

On 19 September 1942, she was killed in Kharkiv in a car accident. Another source says she died "under the wheels of a German truck."

== Selected works ==
- To the sources about the Decembrist revolt in Ukraine // Archival Affairs. 1926. Vol. 2–3. Pp. 65–70.
- Some notes on the archives of Paris // Archival Affairs. Vol. 5–6. 1928. pp. 40–44.
- Secret agents in Ukraine a hundred years ago: According to the reports and notes of V. S. Sotnikov // Decembrists in Ukraine: a collection of works of the commission for the study of community trends in Ukraine. Vol. 2. Kyiv, 1930. P. 1.
- The Case of Yakov Drahomanov // Decembrists in Ukraine: Collection of Works of the Commission for Studies of Communities. Currents in Ukraine. Vol. 2. Kyiv, 1930. pp. 155–173.
- Materials on the history of the Decembrist movement in Ukraine // Essays on the socio-economic history of Ukraine. Vol. 1. Kyiv, 1932. pp. 295–324.
