= Kharkiv Korolenko State Scientific Library =

- Харківська державна наукова бібліотека імені В. Г. Короленка
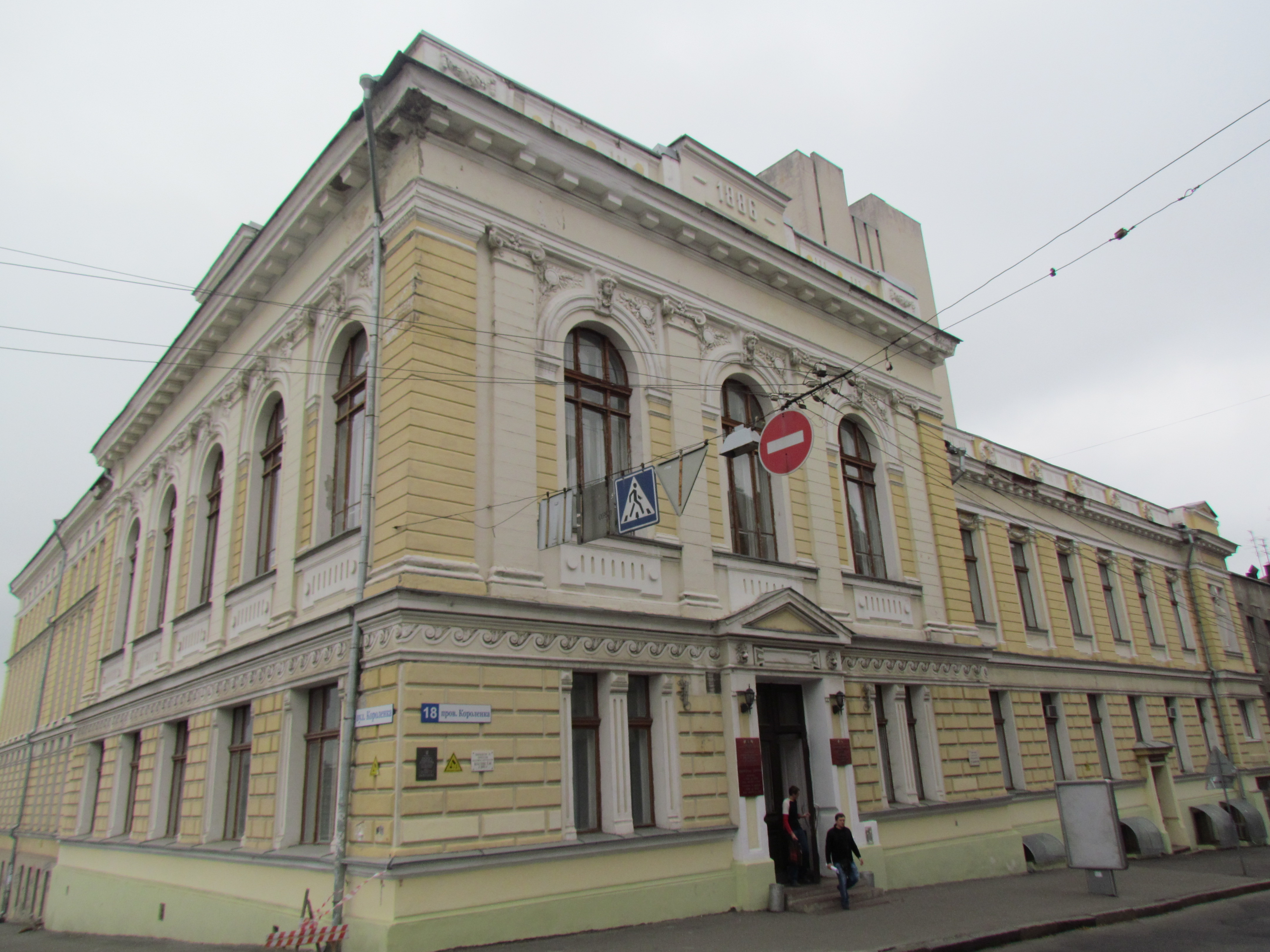
- 49°59′26.65″N 36°14′4.74″E
- Location: Kharkiv, Korolenko lane, 18, Ukraine
- Established: 8 October 1886

Other information
- Website: korolenko.kharkov.com

Immovable Monument of Local Significance of Ukraine
- Official name: «Бібліотека ім. Короленка» (Korolenko Library)
- Type: Urban Planning, Architecture
- Reference no.: 7154-Ха

Kharkiv State Scientific Library of Vladimir Korolenko (Ukrainian: Харківська державна наукова бібліотека імені В. Г. Короленка, romanized: Kharkivska derzhavna naukova biblioteka imeni V. H. Korolenka) is the second largest library in Ukraine after the Library of Vernadsky in Kyiv. There are 12 reading rooms for 524 places.

Annually, the library receives 70,000 new books, magazines, newspapers, databases and electronic documents.

== History ==
=== 19th century ===
The Kharkiv Korolenko State Scientific Library was established in 1886 as the Kharkiv Public Library. It was founded by A. Ruhr, Professor A. Kirpichnikov, M.F. Sumtsov, and others. The library relied upon donations, and charged readers for using its books.

In the first year of operation of the library in the three wing of Nicholas Square (now Square. Constitution) readers served by five employees, the fund totaled 1 700 copies of publications. It published "The first public library catalog Kharkiv (H., 1886.-89s.). These directories published in 1913.

- 1889 – A format-serial arrangement of fund, which is used now.
- 1890 – on the outskirts of the city created the branch libraries for the workers.
- 1896 – In the tenth year of existence, the library fund totaled 41.6 thousand copies. Basis dokumentozabezpechennya were donations. "During the first ten years of 2 000 individuals and institutions received 39 806 volumes ... The average postupalo 4 000 volumes per year (Bagaley DI, Miller DP history of Kharkiv on 250 years of its existence (1655–1905) . V.2 .- H., 1993. – S.754).. Daruvalysya separate edition and library goals. Particularly well-known Russian writer GP Danilevskim (over 3 thousand copies.), A prominent lawyer KN Annenkov (1.7 thousand copies.) Doctor VI Pora-Kosice (1.8 thousand copies.). The bulk of the collections from their own libraries gave also known philologist-slovist OO Potebnya, Professor V. Dobrotvorskyy, PI Sokal, writer I. Aksakov, and many other important personalities.
- 1898 – started a general alphabetical directory for the Prussian system of book description.

=== 20th century - present ===
- 1901 – Moving to a new building (now Lane. Korolenko, 18). The building made by architect Oleksiy Beketov. His father was a member of the board of the library and son got for his development of the honorary title of academician of architecture. Started issuing readers free subscribers (teachers in primary schools and colleges, students, exchange students and others. Category).
- 1903 – became the first public library opens knyhozbiren country music department (for example the Paris Library), Department of Manuscripts and autographs (at the initiative of chairman DI Bahaliya), Department Yudaica, which focuses on Jewish literature. Bezpretsendentnym phenomenon was the discovery of library (on the initiative of Ljubow Chawkina). Formed a unique content of document library fund. Becomes more active work to identify, study and promotion of best library experience, including foreign, expand international relations. HHB foreign partners are renowned library institutions and organizations of the United States (Library of Congress, the New York Public Library, the library of New York at Albany, the Public Library in Manchester Public Library. Krera in Chicago), Great Britain (British Library, library offices in London, Klerkenvilska Library), France (National Library in Paris), the International Bibliographic Institute in Bryuselli and libraries in Germany, Austria, Japan and other countries.
- 1904 – The third from the entrance of Russian workers with technical and vocational education (St. Petersburg, January) spivpratsivnytsya library LB Havkina advance library education project.
- 1905 – The Library took part in the World Exhibition in Liège (Belgium) and was awarded an honorary diploma. Displayed at the exhibition book LB Havkinoyi the Library their organization and Technology (St. Petersburg, 1904) won a gold medal.
- 1906 – At the initiative of the Library Board GM DI Abramov and Bahaliya opens the Ukrainian team. He had no analogs in the whole country. Among the main activities of the Ukrainian commission, which guided his work have been to provide funds for acquisition of publications about the history, economy, and culture of Ukraine, works of Ukrainian writers, regional instruments bibliohrafuvannya these materials and so on. In different years within the Ukrainian commission were M. Mikhnovskyy, first chairman, passionate warriors for the national idea, the author of a popular political treatise "Independent Ukraine", D. Bagaley, H. Alchevsk, S. Dremtsov, O. Gabel known writer Mr. Hotkevich, who was chairman of the commission in 1914, and other famous figures of Ukrainian culture.
- 1910 – Thanks to the efforts and anxieties of the Commission and Member of Ukrainian-Ukrainian, Kharkiv City Council before 50th anniversary of the death of TG Shevchenko decided: "donate Kharkiv Public Library 300 rubles once – and 50 rubles annually – to the Ukrainian division, so that it was dedicated to the memory of the great Ukrainian poet. Since this unit was called the "Ukrainian Department of Taras Shevchenko (it existed until 1916).
- 1911 – 25 years of HHB. The number of fund, which amounted to 142 thousand copies., The library is in third place among the "provincial" public libraries of the Russian Empire in terms of books issued to readers – last place after the Imperial Public Library. Library participated in the 1st All-Russian Congress of librarians.
- 1912 – ongoing print "catalog of books in Ukrainian Kharkiv public library" (H., 1912.-98s.) Prepared by Paul Makrousom. It was the first Ukrainian language bibliographic guide devoted to the Ukrainian book in the library.
- 1916 – Opens a children's department. It serves children from 4 years to 14 years and subsequently transformed into one of the leading libraries of the country.
- 1917 – After the revolution of the Public library gets new content. Subordinated to the new demands, it fully supports the educational movement, becoming one of the branches of ideological activity.
- 1918 – organized "Friends of books (children's department at the library)
- 1920 – The library becomes a public institution of culture (according to the decree on the nationalization of Kharkiv hubvykonkomu libraries) and is subject Holovpolitprosviti Commissariat (from December). Established consulting division, headed by Borys Borovych, outstanding bibliotekoznavets, knyhoznavets, teacher. Department quickly gaining popularity as a cultural, informational and scientific-methodical center.
- 1921- Acquired designation of state library and became a national depository
- 1922 – The library was named after Ukrainian Russian-speaking writer Vladimir Korolenko. Stav receive free copy of that issued in RFSR.
- 1923 – Borys Borovych participates in first meeting of the All-Ukrainian Workers book. Arrange peresuvok network in the business of Kharkiv and in the suburbs.
- 1924 – Established a reading room newspapers and magazines. BA Borovichi I participate in the All-Russian Conferences (Moscow).
- 1925 – With the change of zoning in the country, the Library becomes the circle, the center of technical support for the library network of the Kharkiv region. It creates new units: department of literature in foreign languages and literature department of languages of the USSR. Restored after a long break ties with the libraries of America, Germany, Austria and other countries. Developing an international book exchange. Library employees are invited to the International Congress of librarians and friends of the book (Prague, June) and a conference on the 50 th anniversary of the American Library Association (Philadelphia, October). At the invitation Ukrholovnauky BA Borovichi speaking a presentation at the first Conference of Research Library of Ukraine (Kyiv, December).
- 1926 – Construction of the First All-Ukrainian Congress of library workers (Kharkiv, June). He was at the library. Borys Borovych invited to the Second All-Russian Conferences (Leningrad, October).
- 1928 – A division Ukrainika, which continued the tradition of Ukrainian liquidated. Olga is headed his Bagaley.
- 1929 – After entering the USSR unified national system of mandatory copy. Library-Union began to receive a copy (of the eight Republican Book Chamber) and the local binding instance (from the printing company in Kharkiv).
- 1930 – The high level of activity and contribution to the development of library science, education, culture, Commissariat Ukraine determines its status as a state research. Since it is called Kharkiv State Scientific Library. Korolenko. Begins a new stage of scientific "biography" institution.
- 1932 – On the basis disbanded advisory department, headed by BA Borovichi (for "socially harmful", he was arrested and died in Stalin HUTABI), established scientific-methodical department. The library was required to receive the Republican printed copy.
- 1933 – Organized the new units: sectors of the media and Interlibrary subscriber (MBA).
- 1934 – HDNB given functions of the regional library.
- 1936 – Children's Department receives a separate room and reorganized in a branch for children and youth.
- 1937 – Library logged vnutrishnosoyuznoho book exchange. Exchange Fund totaled 6 000 copies.
- 1940 – Organized research and bibliography section, based on scientific methodology, and department of rare books and manuscripts.
- 1941–1943 – During the German Nazi occupation of Kharkiv was destroyed and plundered more than 600 thousand of valuable publications, among them the rarest ancient Ukrainian 17th–18th century; Lifetime editions of classic works of world literature, a collection of geographical maps XYIII-XX (over 10 thousand copies.) Scientific and technical publications; a unique collection of books for children and young people (about 95 thousand . ca.), which included publication of the 19th century works of Jewish scholars and writers. Removed unique systematic catalog (he totaled more than 1.2 million cards). Through efforts by MI Rumnytskoyi, director, LV Anokhin, L. Wolf, O. Gavrilova, EV Dolinskyi, GD Klyavynoyi, T. Malets, EA Martin, A. N. Omelchenko, EP Panchenko, NI Radchenko, N. Rozalon, AF Samarin, SN Stavrovsky and other library employees and residents city, most of the fund managed to survive. Information loss HDNB during occupation regime are among the materials indictment at Nuremberg Trial 1945–1946 biennium
- 1944 – Library began to receive free compulsory destination printed copy, which was intended to restore the book fund.
- 1949 – Under the new order of acquisition of the leading libraries of the country required a specimen approved by the Council of Ministers of the USSR, HDNB began to receive two copies of paid mandatory: All-Union (with the central reservoir of scientific libraries) and republican (with the Kiev regional collector).
- 1951 – Updated receipts of Union obov'zkovoho free printed copy of the All-Union Book Chamber (which ceased in 1960)
- 1956 – Open Patent office (converted in 1969 at the Department of Technical Literature).
- 1964 – According to Decree of the Ministry of Culture of Ukraine (from the 7/11/1964 City) Library was to serve as Republican methodical center (on promotion of technical literature) and zonal (providing technical assistance in various areas of libraries, Donetsk, Dnipropetrovsk, Dnipropetrovsk, Luhansk, Sumy and Kharkiv regions). Organized and conducted a workshop on the Republican staff and Interlibrary Distance subscription regional libraries of the USSR. A meeting of directors of the regional libraries of the East of Ukraine, which dealt with technical activities, etc.
- 1965 – Organized the Republican seminar reading rooms, meeting heads of regional and central city libraries.
- 1969 – On the basis of sector interlibrary loans department established MBA.
- 1971 – Library is a regional center for interlibrary loans to libraries, Poltava, Sumy and Kharkiv regions.
- 1975 – creates the department of research. Research (Union, national, regional and local) is one of the main directions of scientific activity. The library was to serve as a universal inter-depository account (for libraries, Poltava, Sumy and Kharkiv regions).
- 1977 – On the basis of scientific and bibliographic department formed two independent business units: information and bibliographic and bibliographic research, which was coordinating and methodological center of the republic up of bibliographic aids for technical and economic issues.
- 1979 – Organized department of local history. Activity begins, "the club of local lore."
- 1986 – On the occasion of 100 anniversary of the library, in Kharkiv Ukrainian Drama Theatre a solemn assembly. It first published research supporting bibliographic index of the library books and literature on its activities "Kharkiv научная the State Library of them. Korolenko. 1886–1986.
- 1988 – disbanded fund literature special storage. Viewers have access to 45 thousand banned earlier editions – the works of famous scientists, writers, public figures and others.
- 1990 – Violent socio-economic and economic changes inherent in the development of the Ukrainian state, led to a comprehensive analysis of experience of work and actively seeking optimal ways for further development. Team motto is: "Tradition + Innovation. Search job direct link to the new intellectual achievements in scientific, cultural, educational, informational activities. Expanding international cultural relations. Dispose of innovation in organizational structure.
- 1990 – A division of library automation and bibliographic processes. Started a development program of automated information and bibliographic library system.
- 1992 – The library held Republican Interdepartmental Scientific Conference "scientific libraries: Status and Prospects", which was attended by about 300 delegates (from libraries of different regions of the country and abroad, cultural institutions, public library associations and other institutions) .
- 1993 – The restored activity of the Ukrainian Division. Based on the work of local history, the department launched Ukrainika multifaceted scientific, cultural, educational and outreach activities in the direction of Ukrainian and regional studies, with the revival of national culture, etc.. Began to be issued Series "Returned Names". Since then print out the bibliographic manuals devoted to Ivan Padaltsi, Vasil Chechvyanskomu, Khvylovy, Gnat Hotkevich, Kulish, Olesya Dosvitnii and other public figures, writers, artists and art. Department Ukrainika was the winner of the Republican Prize. D. Yavornitskogo for his significant contribution to the development of Ukrainian regional studies. A regional interagency scientific conference "History of libraries in Ukraine." On the eve of 90 anniversary of establishment of library arranged library reading room (with scientific methodology section). Begins focused and mediated formation of document and information resources of this subsection, various documents on the history, theory and practice of librarianship.
- 1995 – In this year Valentyna Rakytianska became the director of the library. As part of a bilateral agreement with the Association "Canadian Friends of Ukraine in the Library opened Ukrainian-Canadian library. Employees attended the 61st session of the IFLA in Istanbul, the international conference "Libraries and Associations in a changing world: new technologies and new forms of cooperation" (Evpatoria, Crimea), the inaugural conference of Ukrainian libraries Association (Kyiv), the international seminar "Restovratsiya and book conservation funds" (Kyiv). There were employees training in libraries in Austria, Germany and the United States. Open primary cell Ukrainian Library Association (UCA). The library became a member of the nationwide survey "Ukrainian book in the library collections and museums in Ukraine (1574–1923 biennium), which prepared the consolidated printed catalog of Ukrainian books. According to the results of this study has produced 5 issues. bibliographic index "Books Ukrainian language in the funds HDNB them. Korolenko, which reflected a total of over 4 thousand Ukrainian language publications that came out in print worldwide. Head. Department Ukrainika Valentina Yaroshik awarded the honorary title of Honored Worker of Ukraine for a significant contribution to local history matter.
- 1996 – On the occasion of 110th anniversary, the Library held a scientific conference and it began publishing collections of scientific papers. By arrangement with the Institute of Eastern and South-East Slavs (Austria) opened the Austrian library. By bilateral agreement with the Goethe Institute (Munich, Germany), established German reading room.
- 1997 – The library joined the few institutions in the country (there are eight) who were receiving scientific publications according to Decree of the Presidium of HAC of Ukraine "On approval of lists of institutions, which must be sent scientific publications (and monographs), which can show the main results of dissertations. Within the project of the American Foundation IREX made connecting libraries to the Internet.
- 1998 – Due to a bilateral agreement with the Council of Europe in HDNB Open Document Library Council of Europe human rights. A first regional interagency scientific conference "Korolenkovski reading, which was summarized scientific development of Kharkiv in librarianship.
- 2022 – The building is damaged by Russian shelling during the 2022 Russian invasion of Ukraine.

Each year the library receives 250 thousand units (up to 1917 received 5 thousand). The library saved 25 thousand rare books: lifetime editions of works of Karl Marx, Vladimir Lenin, ages 15–18 books in foreign languages and the languages of the USSR, among them: "The Apostle", printed by Ivan Fedorov in 1574, "Anfolohion" print. Kyiv Cave. Lavrov, 1619; Shevchenko T. "Haydamaky, SPB, 1841, AS Pushkin and Taras Shevchenko," New Poems ", Leyytsih, 1859. The library is a Republican and educational kult. n.-d. institution in the field of library science and bibliography. In addition to 30 thousand regular readers, the library serves a large number of reader correspondence and mizhbibl. subscribe. Library conducts n.-d. work, methodological issues and bibliographic materials.

== International relations ==
The library has extensive international links. The partners of Kharkiv Korolenko State Scientific Library – Library of Congress, National Library of Bulgaria, Poland, Portugal, Turkey, Cuba, the library of the University of Sapporo (Japan), Sofia (Bulgaria), Lublin and Poznan (Poland), Austrian Institute for the southern and south-eastern Slavs Yang (Vienna), the Goethe Institute (Munich, Germany), Institute of Electrical and electronics engineers (USA), US-Ukrainian Foundation "Saber-Light", International Renaissance Foundation, Friends of Ukraine (Canada), etc. When the department of literature in foreign languages open the Austrian Library, the German reading room and library, the Council of Europe on Human Rights at the Department Ukrainika – Ukrainian-Canadian library with scientific-methodical department, an office library.

== Literature ==
- Ukrainian Soviet Encyclopedia
