= Kharkiv Public Library =

Library in Kharkiv, Ukraine

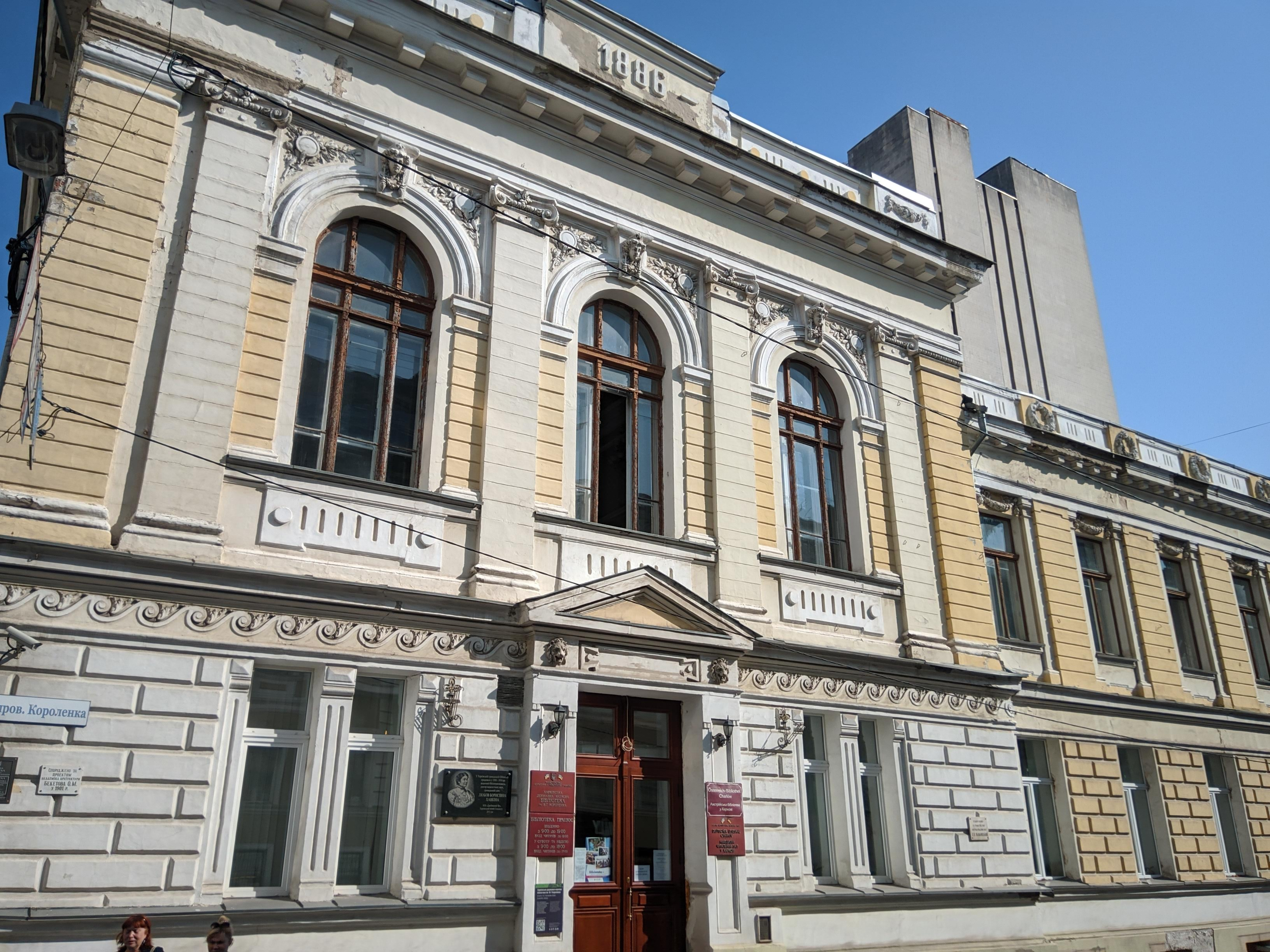
- Interactive map of Kharkiv Public Library
- Location: Ukraine, Kharkiv, Korolenko Lane, 18
- Coordinates: 49°59′27.01″N 36°14′4.78″E
- Designer: Oleksiy Mykolaovych Beketov
- Type: library
- Material: brick
- Height: 2 floors
- Beginning date: May 16, 1899
- Completion date: June 26, 1900
- Opening date: January 28, 1901
- Restored date: 1920s – extension; 1970–1980 – extension of the book depository; 1986 – restoration; 2022–present – conservation after the Russian strike;
- Website: https://korolenko.kharkov.com/
- Heritage status: Monument of architecture and urban planning of local significance of Ukraine № 7153-Xa, Monument of history of local significance of Ukraine № 91

The Kharkiv Public Library (Ukrainian: Харківська громадська бібліотека, romanized: Kharkivska hromadska biblioteka, Kharkiv Korolenko State Scientific Library) is an architectural monument located in the center of Kharkiv, Ukraine in Korolenko Lane, 18. It was erected in 1899–1901 according to the design of the prominent Ukrainian architect Oleksiy Beketov, who performed the work free of charge. The building is a monument of architecture and urban planning of local significance of Ukraine (№ 7153-Ха) and a monument of history of local significance of Ukraine (№ 91). The library building was damaged by Russian shelling during the battles for Kharkiv in 2022.

== History ==
When the need arose for a new building for the Library Board, after several options, they settled on almost the only plot in the city center that had not yet been built up and belonged to Kharkiv University. In the 18th century, the classes of the Kharkiv Collegium were located on this site, and later — the Main Sloboda-Ukrainian School.

On May 16, 1899, in the presence of Governor G. A. Tobizen, Rector of Kharkiv University M. M. Alekseyenko, Chairman of the Board of the KGB D. I. Bagaliy, representatives of the Kharkiv City Council and the public, the solemn laying of the building took place. The project was carried out free of charge by the prominent Ukrainian architect Oleksiy Mykolayovych Beketov. For this work, he received the title of Academician of Architecture.

In the summer of 1900, the building was erected: a two-story building with a basement with a total area of 1297 m² (608 sq. fathoms).

The extension to the library building from Mykolaivska Street was completed later, when Kharkiv was under the occupation of the Soviet Union, and the country began to move away from the old styles and priority was given to functionality, not beauty. But this building stylistically repeats the original building. It was built according to the design of the author of the main building in the late 1920s and partially bombed during the Second World War.

In 1970–1980, according to the project of architect Yu. V. Weitzman, a 12-story book depository was added to the building from the courtyard. Currently, the library stores approximately 7,000,000 publications, which makes it the largest library in Kharkiv and Eastern Ukraine. Its funds contain many ancient books and documents. Among them are the rarest Ukrainian old prints of the 17th–18th centuries; lifetime editions of works by classics of world literature; a collection of geographical maps of the 18th-20th centuries; scientific and technical publications; a unique collection of books of the 19th and 20th centuries, etc.

In 1986, the building was restored by architect Iryna Malakova.

The library building was damaged by Russian shelling during the battles for Kharkiv in 2022. In particular, historical windows and a stained glass window in the skylight were broken, facades, interior decoration and a grand piano were damaged, two book depositories and the main building were damaged. The library building was partially preserved later, but as of 2025, it has not yet resumed stable operation.

An information plaque with the text "Built according to the design of Academician of Architecture Beketov O. M. in 1901" is installed on the facade, as well as a memorial plaque in honor of Lyubov Borisovna Khavkina, an outstanding librarian, Doctor of Pedagogical Sciences, and public figure who worked in the building in 1890–1918.

== Architecture ==
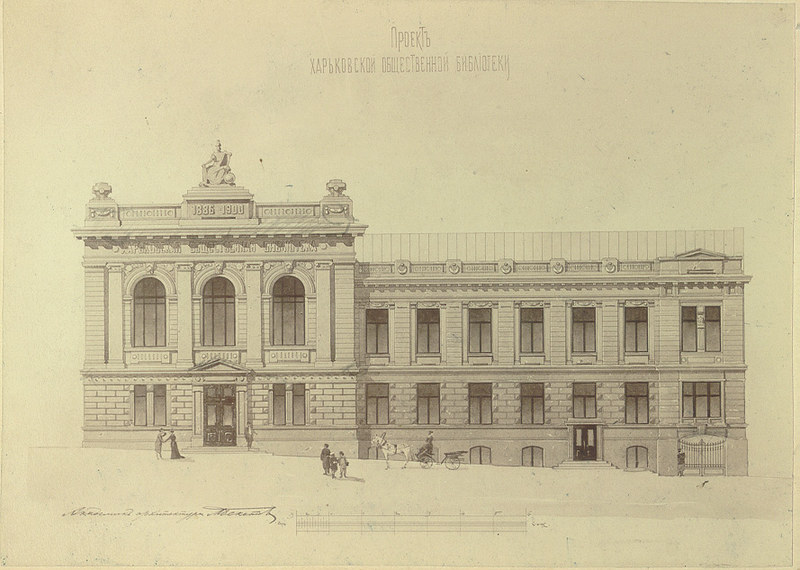
Building design created by Oleksiy Beketov

The building is made in the Neo-Renaissance style, like many other Beketov buildings. Originally, the building was to be crowned with a sculpture of the ancient Greek goddess of wisdom Athena, but for an unknown reason, this was not implemented. The facades are decorated with pilasters of the composite order, mascarons of women, stucco with wreaths and vegetation. The first floor is rusticated, decorated with simpler pilasters between the windows and a wave-like pattern on the cornice. The main entrance is framed by a portico and lion mascarons. The additional entrance is less decorative, but the original wooden doors have been preserved there. The gate leading to the courtyard from the right wing of the building was walled up during the years of Soviet occupation. Above them is a caryatid.

Inside the library, the original interiors have been preserved: marble stairs with a wrought-iron fence, a skylight with a stained glass window (destroyed by a Russian missile strike in 2022), wall framing. Of particular interest is the main reading room. It is made in the Neo-Renaissance style, the walls and ceiling are richly decorated with stucco, decorated with pilasters, on their capitals you can see female mascarons. On the ceiling you can see stucco torches, mascarons of women and plant stucco around a large white canvas. Probably, there used to be a fresco on it, as in many other interiors by Beketov.

The extension to the library building from Mykolaivska Street stylistically repeats the original building. The high-rise extension in the courtyard and from Korolenko Lane, which has become one of the dominants of the city center, is a large book depository. It was built in 1970-1980 in the Brutalist style. The facade is completely devoid of decoration, only the windows separate the huge reinforced concrete building.

=== Interesting fact ===
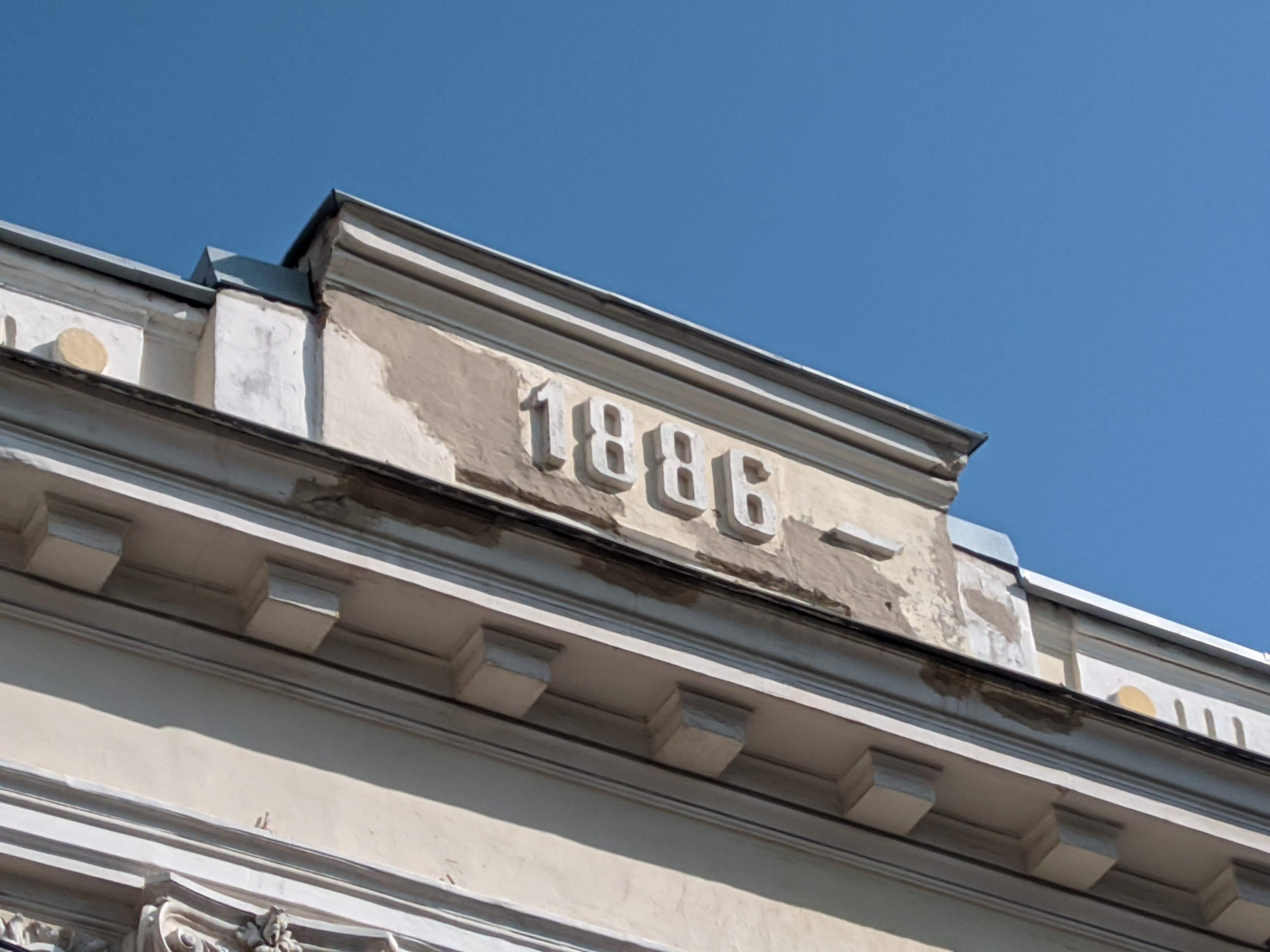
Stucco with the year on the building

Although the building was erected in 1899–1900, the facade shows the numbers "1886", which reflect the year the library was founded. Before the construction of a separate building, the library was located alternately at three addresses, the first — an outbuilding in the courtyard of the City Duma on Mykolaivska Square.

== Members of the Library Board ==
- Raevsky Serhiy Oleksandrovych, mandatory member of the Board from the city public administration (1900–1918)
- Kadlubovsky Arseniy Petrovych (1902–1915)
- Rumnitska Maria Ivanivna (1914–1918)

=== Chairmen of the Board ===
- Filonov Borys Hryhorovych (1885–1893)
- Serebryakov Mykhailo Mykhailovych (1893–1894)
- Bahaliy Dmytro Ivanovych (1894–1906)
- Gruzintsev Oleksiy Petrovych (1906–1907)
- Abramov Georgiy Mykolayovych (1907–1908), member of the Board 1905–1908
- Komarov Apollon Petrovych (1908–1910), member of the Board 1894–1918
- Antsyferov Oleksiy Mykolayovych (1910–1918), member of the Board 1909–1918

== Gallery ==
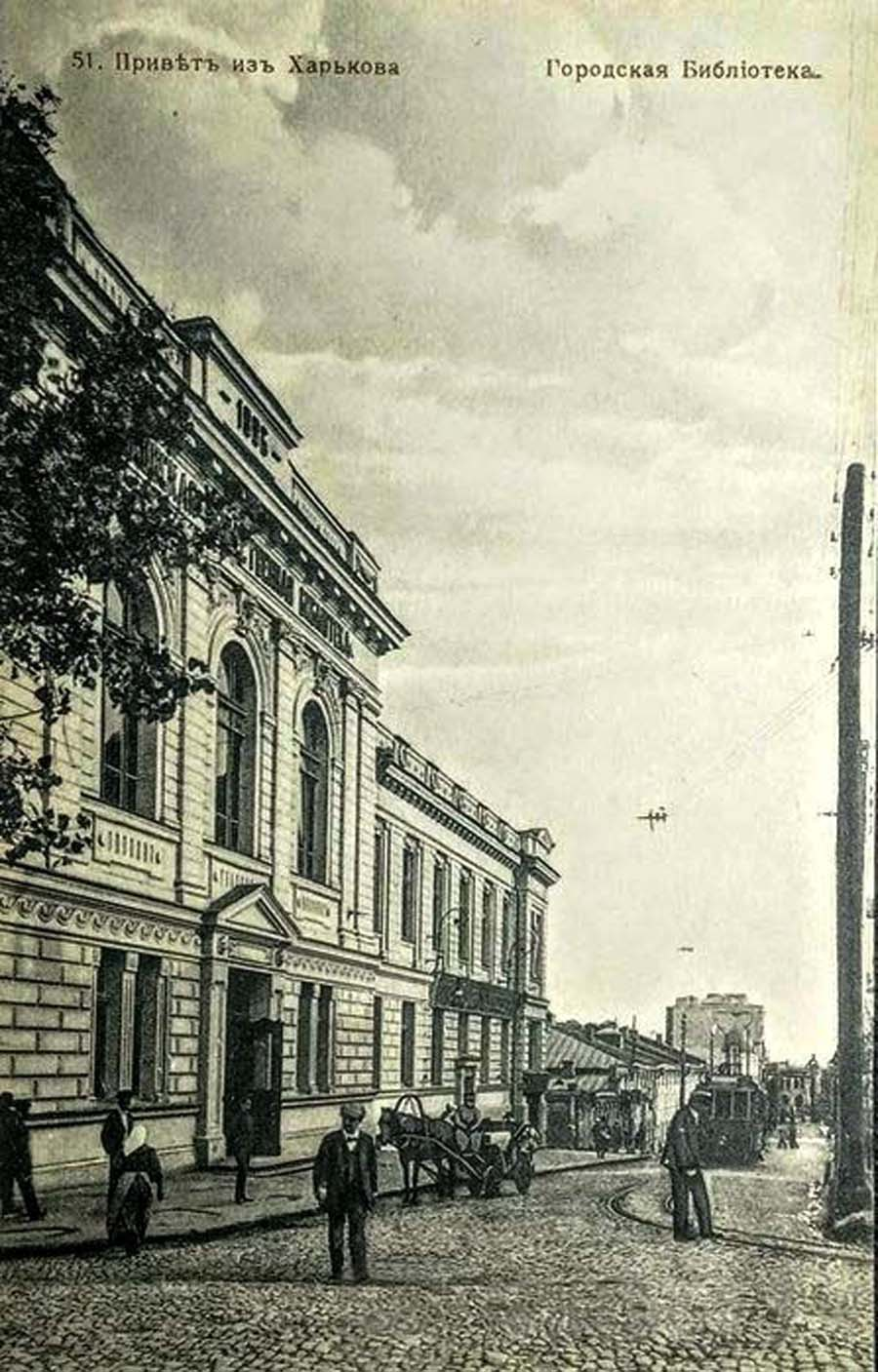
Postcard with an image of the Kharkiv Public Library. Early 20th century

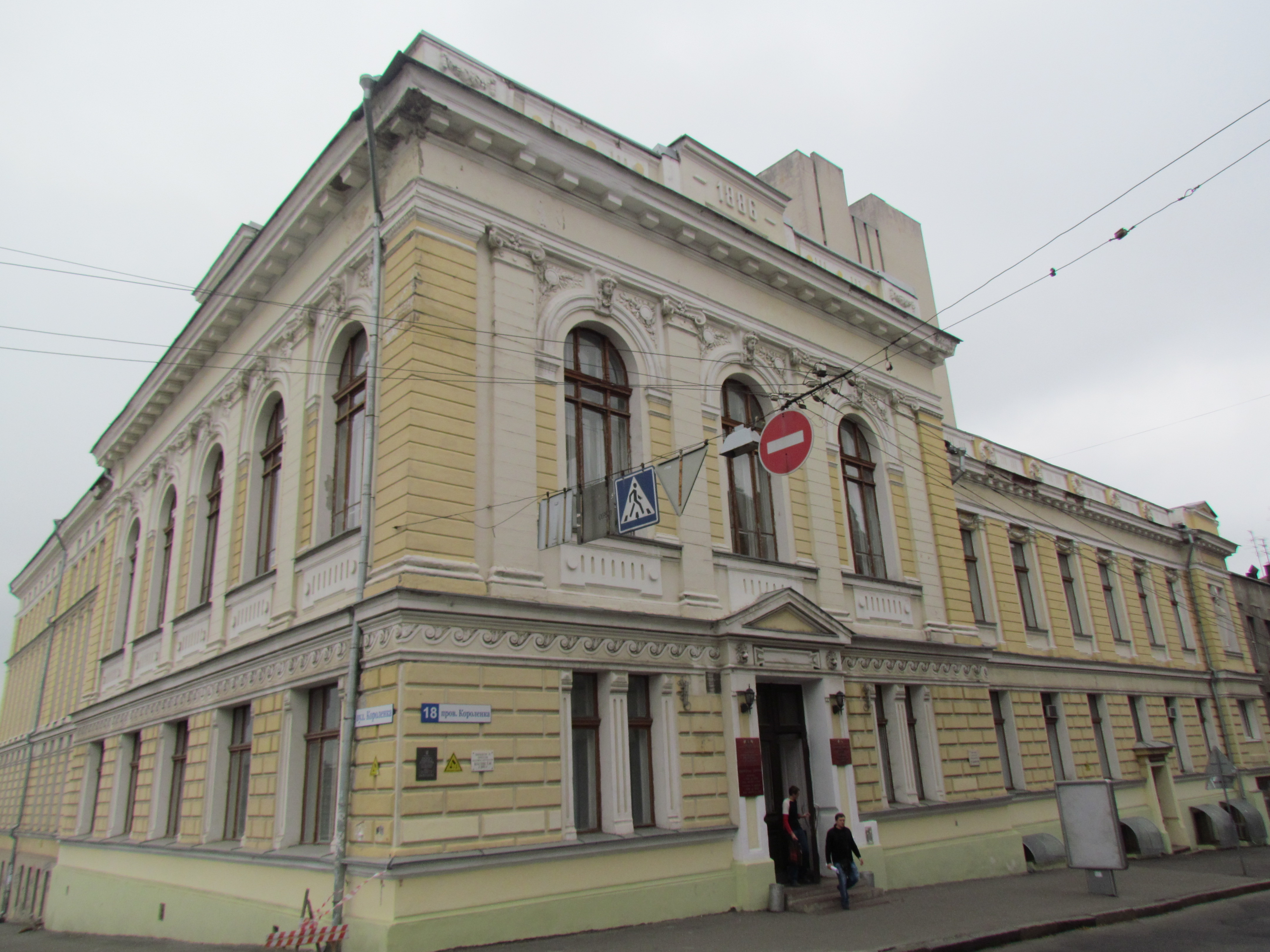
From the side of Mykolaivska Street

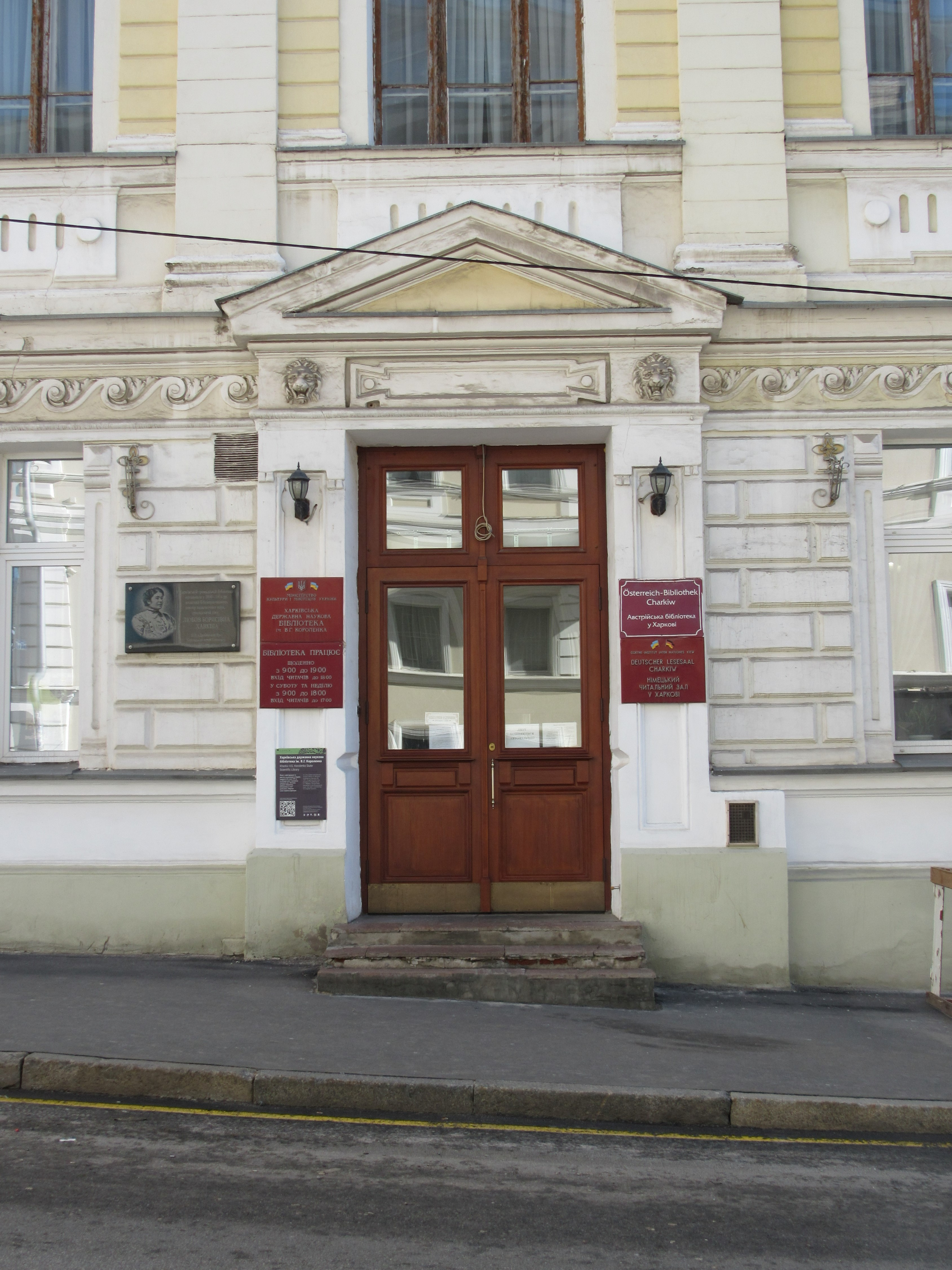
Main entrance

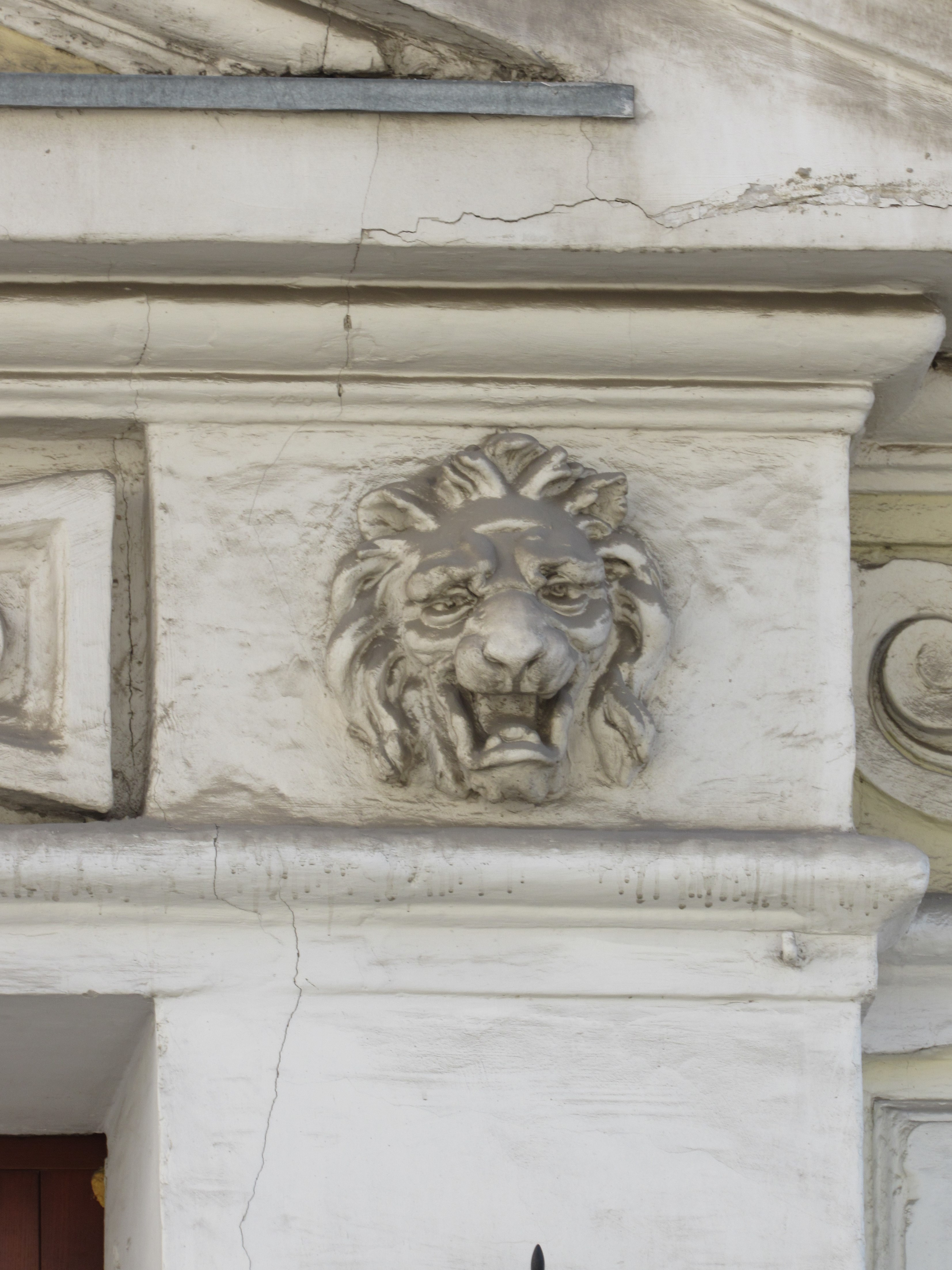
Lion mascaron

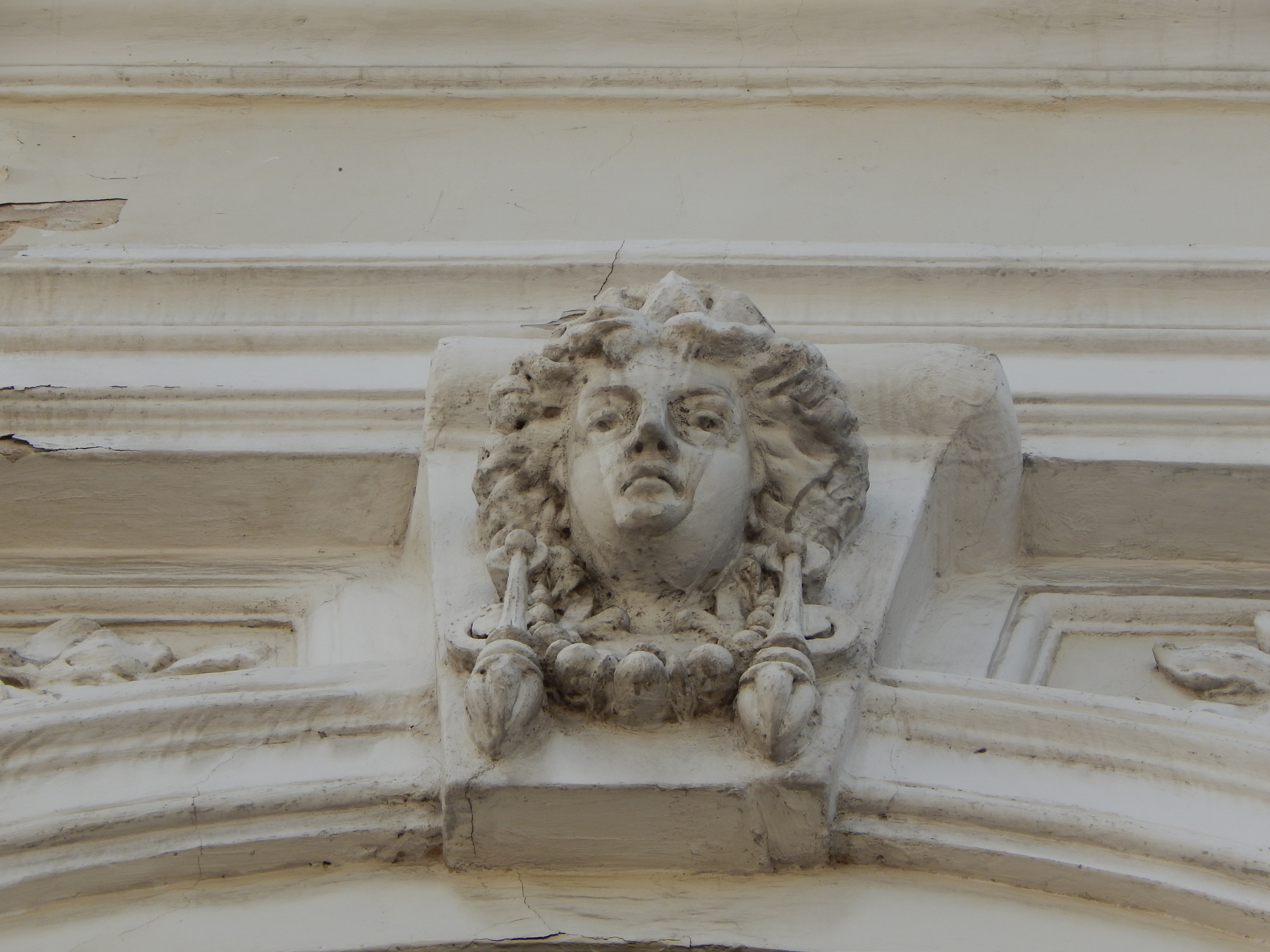
Female mascaron

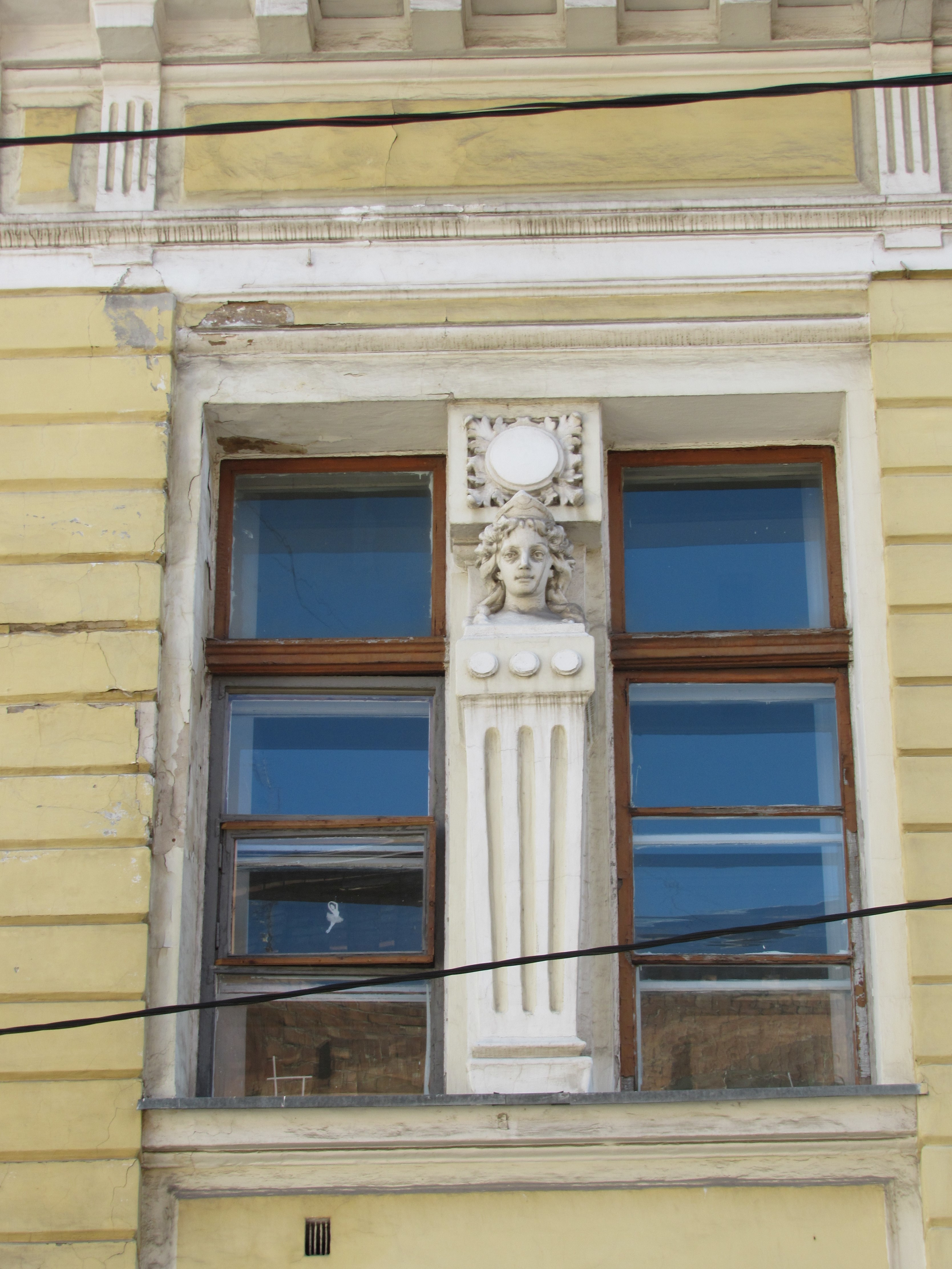
Caryatid

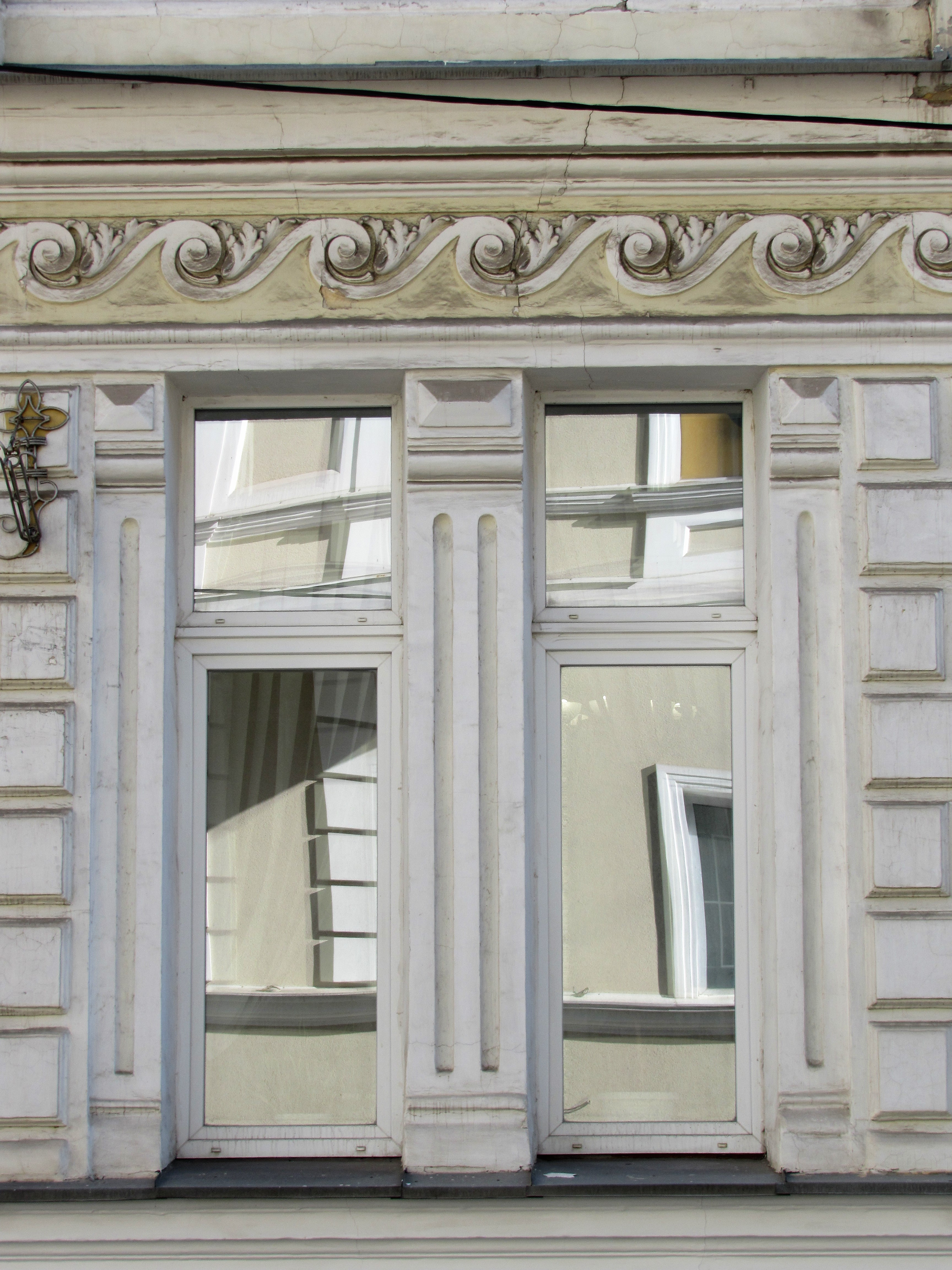
Details

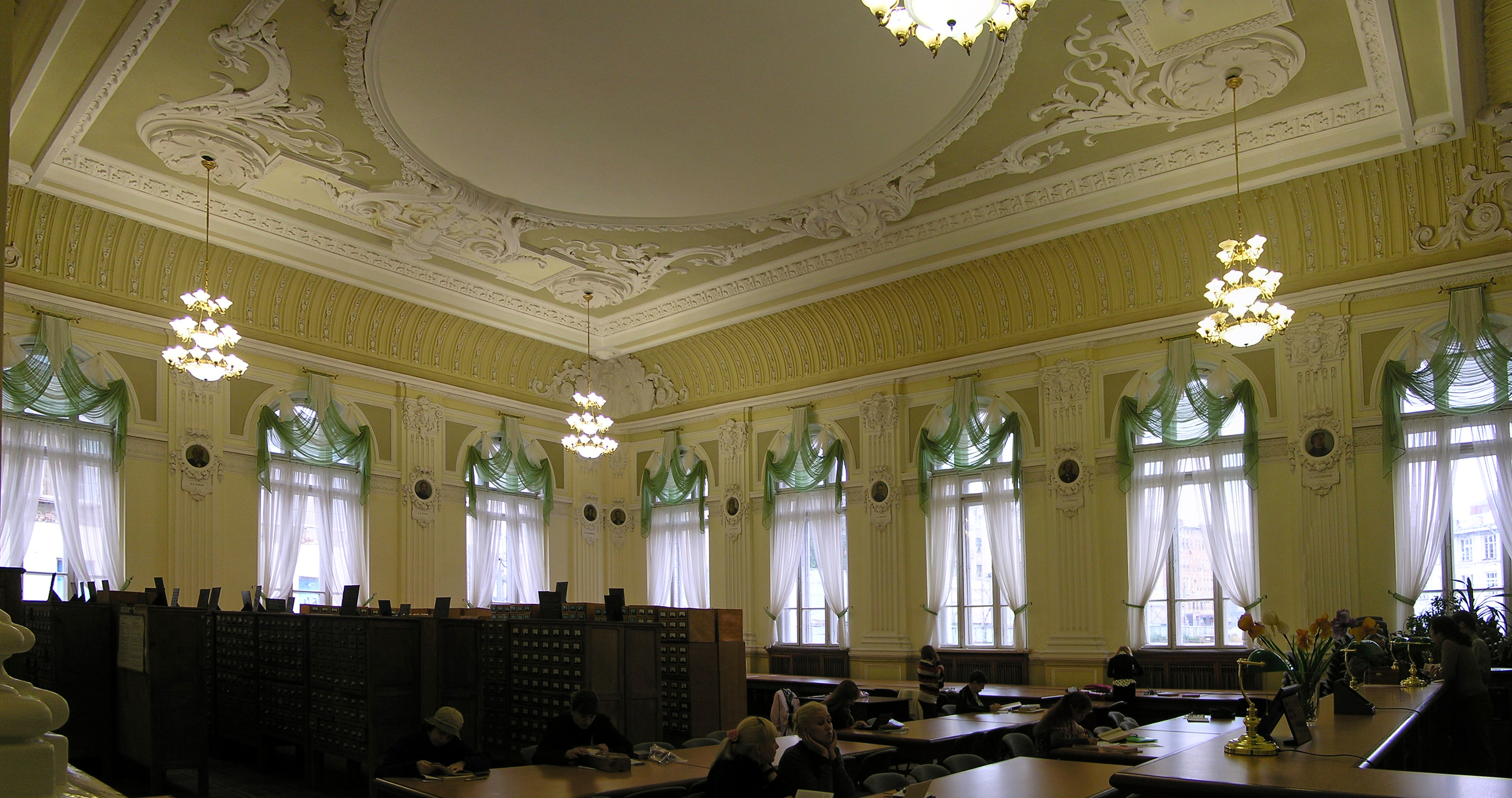
Main reading room

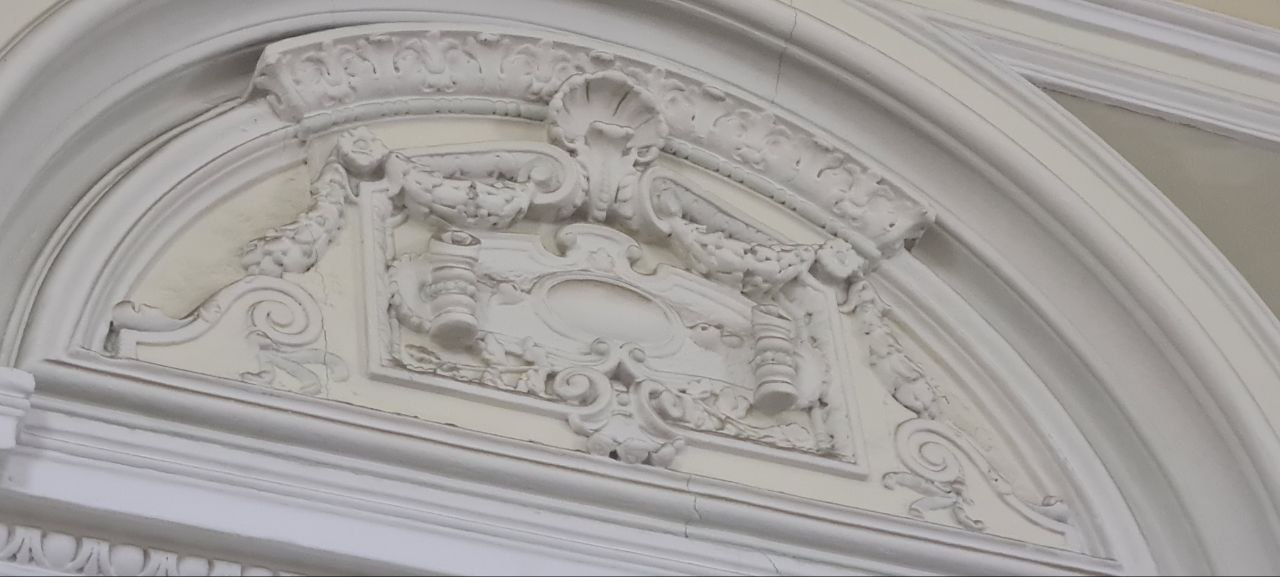
Reading room decoration

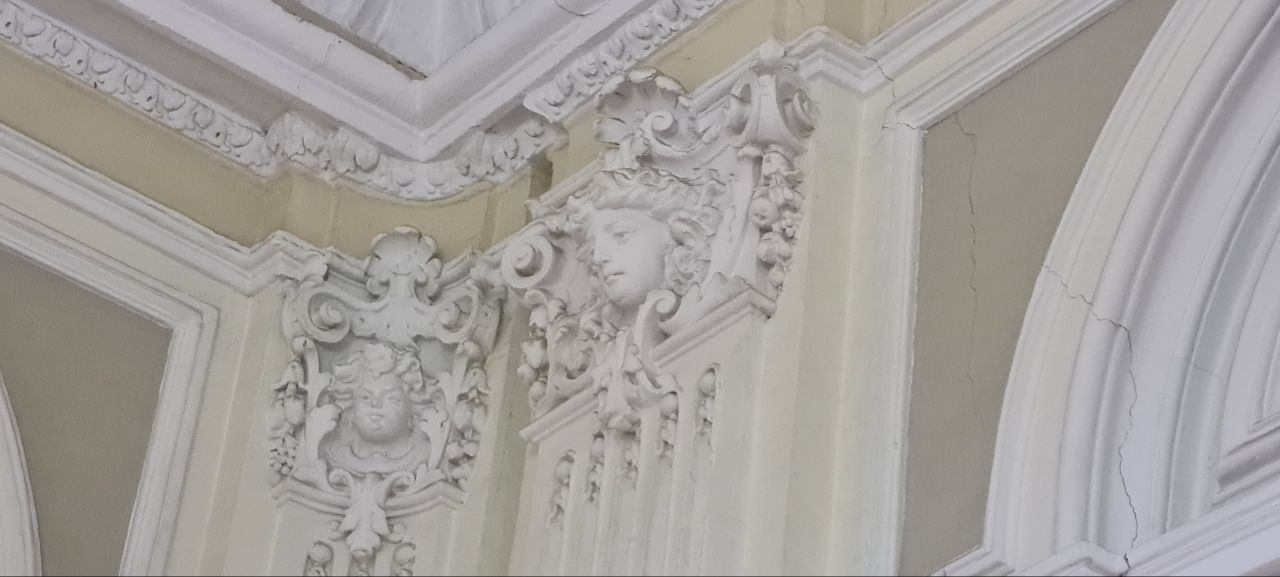
Reading room decoration

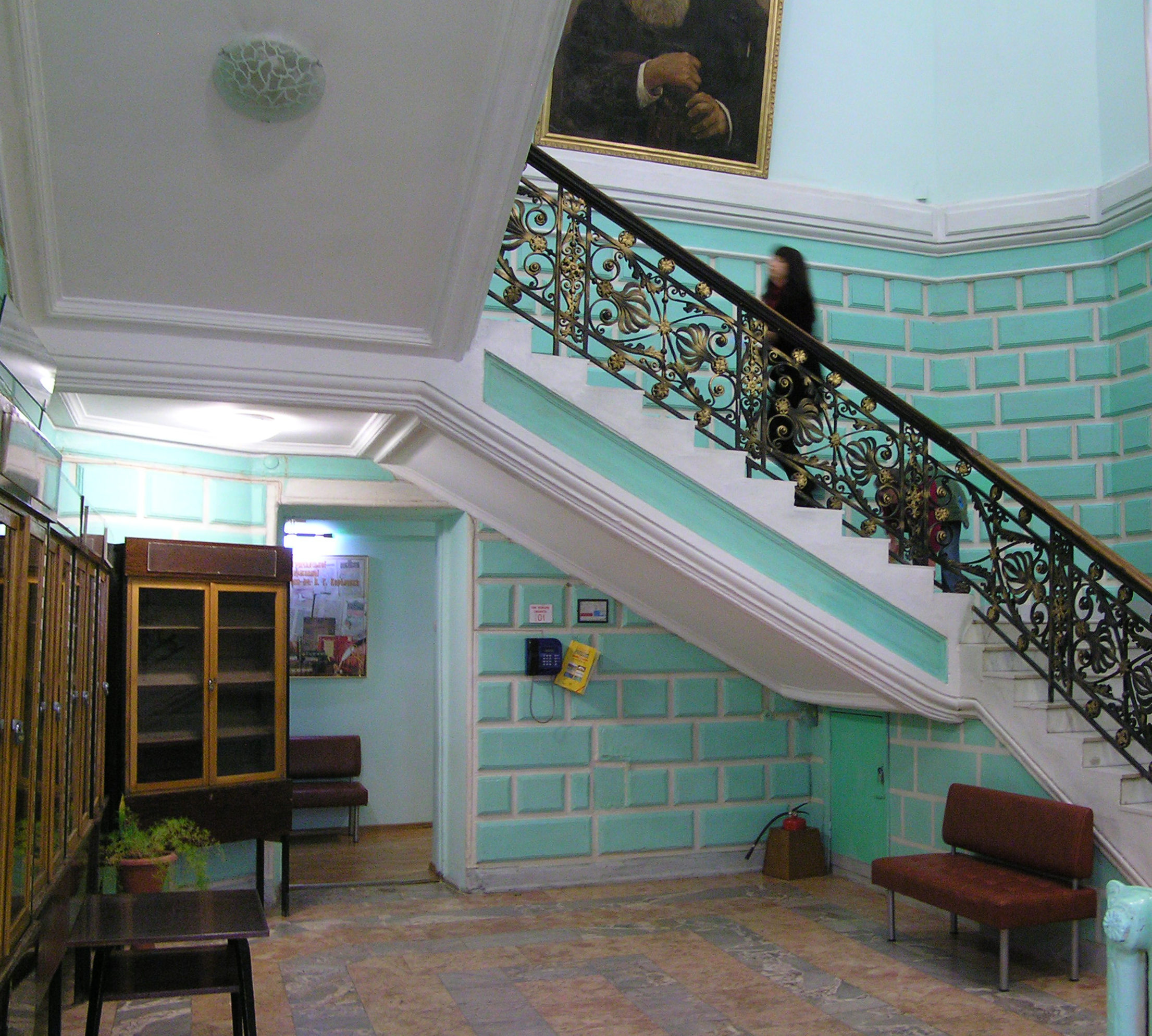
Stairs

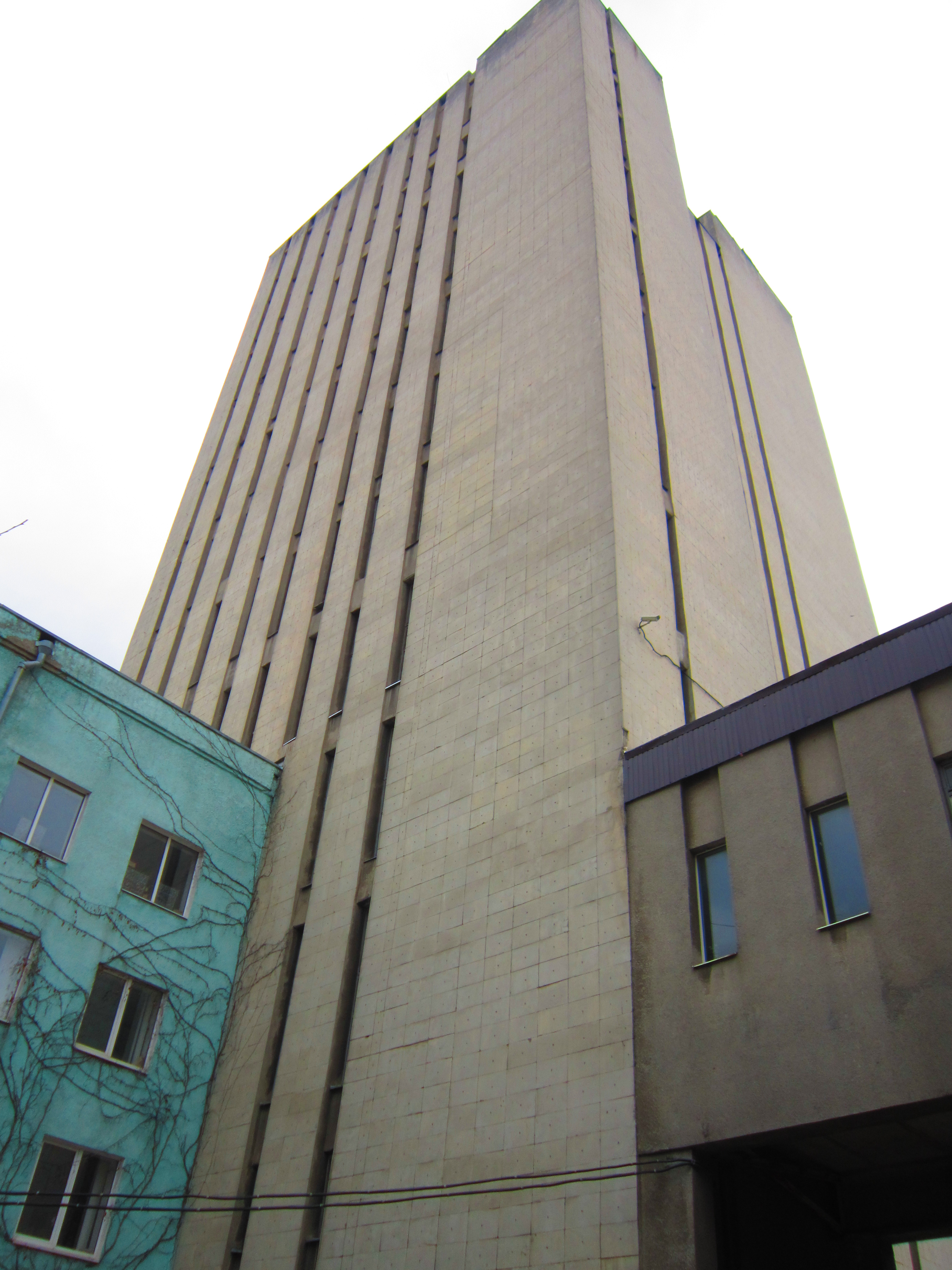
Book Depository

== See also ==
- Kharkiv Korolenko State Scientific Library
- Oleksiy Beketov
