= Valentyna Rakytianska =

Ukrainian librarian (1948–2021)

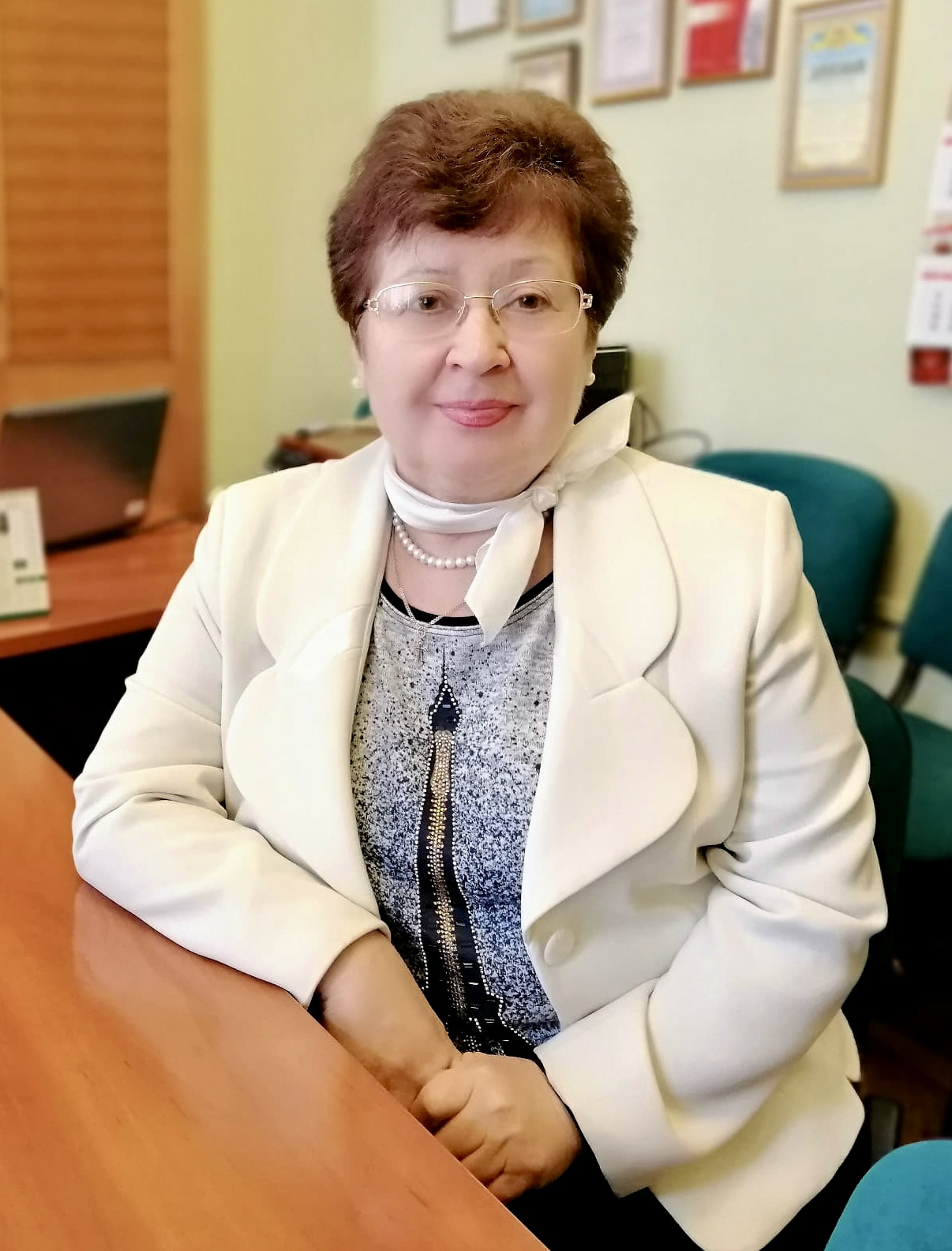
- Born: 15 October 1948; Bender, Moldova
- Died: 23 October 2021 (aged 73); Kharkiv, Ukraine
- Occupation: Librarian
- Known for: Director of the Kharkiv Korolenko State Scientific Library

Valentyna Rakytianska (15 October 1948 – 23 October 2021) was a Ukrainian librarian who served as the director of the Kharkiv Korolenko State Scientific Library.

== Early life ==
Rakytianska was born in Tighina, Moldavian SSR (now Bender, under unrecognized Transnistrian control) in 1948. She graduated from the Kharkiv State Institute of Culture.

== Career ==
Rakytianska worked many years in library service, becoming the deputy director of the Kharkiv Korolenko State Scientific Library in 1984. In 1995, she became the director of the Kharkiv Korolenko State Scientific Library.

Using funding from the United States Embassy, she modernized the library. Between 2004 and 2005, she expanded the local library network, making 27 book collections available.

== Awards and honors ==
- 1998 – Diploma of the Kharkiv Regional State Administration
- 1999 – Honored Worker of Culture of Ukraine
- 2003 – Diploma of the Kharkiv Regional State Administration

== Personal life ==
Rakytianska died in Kharkiv, Ukraine, on 23 October 2021, from COVID-19, during the COVID-19 pandemic in Ukraine.
