= Dmytro Bahalii =

Ukrainian historian

- Дмитро Іванович Багалій / Дмитрій Ивановичъ Багалѣй
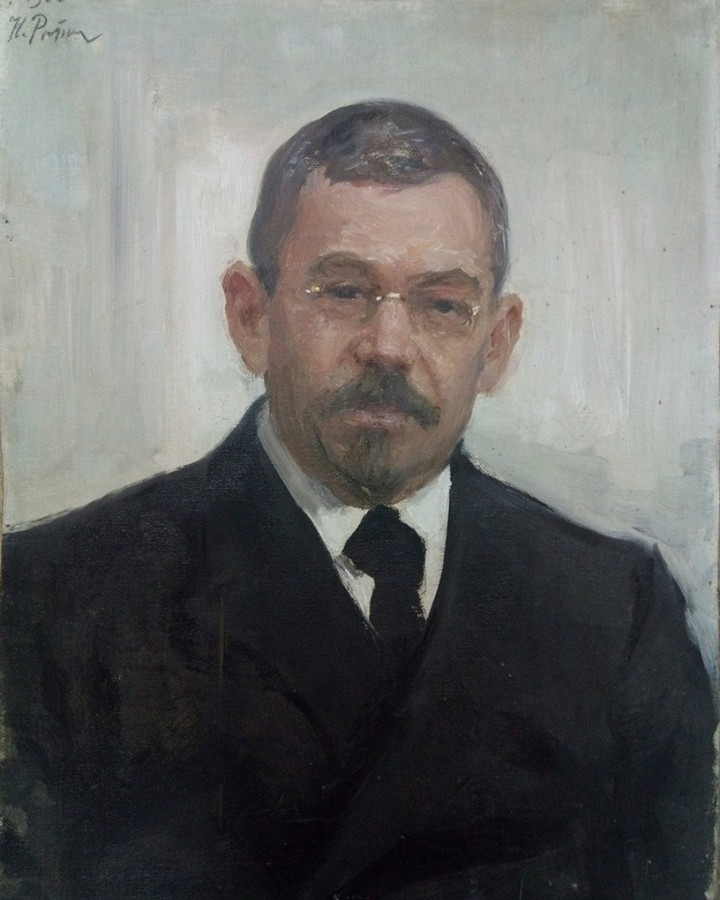
- Portrait by Ilya Repin (1906)
- Pronunciation: Dmitrij Ivanovich Bagalej
- Born: 7 November 1857; Kyiv
- Died: 9 February 1932 (aged 74); Kharkiv
- Education: Taras Shevchenko National University
- Occupation: Historian
- Employer: VN Karazin Kharkiv National University
- Known for: see § Works
- Political party: Constitutional Democratic Party
- Board member of: National Academy of Sciences of Ukraine • Shevchenko Scientific Society
- Children: Olga Dmitrievna Bagalei-Tatarinova

Signature
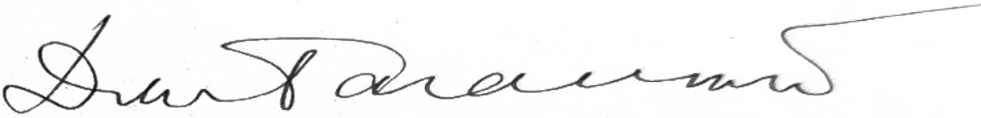

Dmytro Ivanovych Bahalii (Ukrainian: Дмитро Іванович Багалій, Russian: Дмитрій Ивановичъ Багалѣй; 1857-1932) was a Ukrainian historian and public and political figure, one of founding members of the National Academy of Sciences of Ukraine, and a full member of the Shevchenko Scientific Society since 1923. He was also a professor and rector at Kharkiv University (1887, 1906–1910), and mayor of Kharkiv (1914–1917).

He served as an official in the Tsarist government, earning the title of Active State Councillor. Later, he became an honorary member of the Imperial Academy of Sciences, and nine universities across the Russian Empire (1906). Until 1917, he was a member of the Constitutional Democratic Party and the State Council. Following the February Revolution, he voluntarily handed over his mayoral seat of Kharkiv to the Socialist-Revolutionary Vladimir Karelin. Starting in the 1930s, Bahalii faced repression by the Soviets.

He was the first to compile a full collection of the works of Hryhoriy Skovoroda.

== Biography ==
=== Early life and education ===
Dmitry Bahalii was born into the family of a craftsman (sadler). After attending a parish school and a progymnasium, he was admitted to the 2nd Kyiv gymnasium, where he graduated with a gold medal in 1876. He then studied at the University of St. Vladimir in Kyiv (for some time from the second semester he was forced to study at Kharkiv University) and was awarded a gold medal for an essay on a given topic. After graduating from the Faculty of History and Philology (1880), he was retained at the university as a scholar in order to prepare for a professorship. For his master's degree, he wrote "History of the Seversk Land", reworking an essay that had been awarded a gold medal.

Bahalii authored several articles in the Encyclopedic Dictionary of Brockhaus and Efron. In one of them, he defined the Chernihiv and Poltava regions as "the core of the former Seversk land," which, from the mid-17th to the second half of the 18th century, "became the ethnographic center of the Little Russians."

=== Work at Kharkiv Historical Archive ===
Since 1883, Dmytro Bahalii was a member of the Historical and Philological Society of Kharkiv University. He, along with historian and ethnographer P. S. Yefimenko, founded the Kharkiv Historical Archive, which supplied documentary resources for the Society's research. Bahalii was involved in collecting archival materials from various sources, including provincial institutions and private collections, from Kharkiv, Poltava, and Chernihiv regions.

In 1883, the council of professors of Kharkiv University elected him as the head of this archive. He accepted the position, despite having to work for several decades without compensation. Under his leadership, and owing to the work by Dmytro Doroshenko and his colleagues, the archive's funds grew becoming a powerful scientific base for research on the history of Slobozhanshchyna, Left Bank Ukraine. A school of historian-archivists was formed, including notable figures like M. Bakay, M. Plokhinskyi, O. Radakova, D. Miller, V. Barvinskyi. Thanks to Bahalii, the archive received subsidies and permanent grants from Kharkiv University. During this time, Bahalii also became an honorary member of many provincial archival commissions, including those in Tambov (1887), Oryol (1889), Tavrii (1890), and Chernihiv (1897), among others.

=== Professorship ===
In 1887, Bahalii defended his doctoral thesis, "Essays on the history of the colonization of the steppe outskirts of the Moscow state," at Moscow University. That same year, he was elected as an extraordinary professor at Kharkiv University, and in 1889, he became an ordinary professor. By 1908, he had been honored as a distinguished professor. While teaching history at the university, he proved himself to be a hardworking and talented teacher and a dedicated scientist. Bahalii also participated in numerous archaeological congresses (in 1884, 1887, 1896, 1899, 1902, 1905, and 1911).

Bahalii actively participated in the studies of the Historical Society of the Chronicler Nestor in Kyiv and the Historical and Philological society in Kharkiv. He attended archaeological congresses in Odessa and Yaroslavl as a delegate from Kharkov University. At the invitation of the chief commander of the Black Sea and Azov fleets, he gave lectures naval officers in Nikolaev. To study historical materials, he visited Chernigov and Poltava and supervised the description of the Kharkov historical archive. He conducted excavations and compiled an archaeological map of the Kharkov province in 1906. Bahalii was also one of the first explorers of the Upper Saltov site.

=== Legacy as a pioneering librarian ===
Dmytro Ivanovych's enlightenment, democratic, and humanistic ideas were implemented during his many years of work at Kharkiv University. He organized various activities related to the book collection, expanding his practical experience as an expert in librarianship. This work formed the basis of his significant librarianship legacy, encapsulated in his speeches and articles: "On the Necessity of Building a House for the Kharkiv Public Library" (1894), "On the Enlightening Value of the Kharkiv Public Library" (1896), "Speech at the Opening of the Branch Office of the Kharkiv Public Library" (1901), "Report on the Establishment of the Department of Manuscripts and Autographs" (1903), "Note by D. I. Bagalei on the Tasks of the Kharkiv Public Library" (1904), "On Methods of Book Purchase" (1904), and "Kharkiv Public Library as a Type of Scientific and Educational Regional Library" (1919).

In his works on the Kharkiv Public Library (HGB), Dmytro Ivanovych examined the historical process of its creation and provides an analysis of statistical data on the library's development, including the number of subscribers, the quantitative and qualitative composition of the collection, the library budget, and financing issues. He also conducts a comparative analysis of the Kharkiv Public Library with other domestic libraries, noting its growth and the expansion of its collections. These themes are explored in his works "On the Necessity of Building a House for the Kharkiv Public Library," "On the Educational Significance of the Kharkiv Public Library," and "Kharkiv Public Library as a Type of Scientific and General Educational Regional Library."

Bahalii attributed the library's success to its public character, collegial management, democratic traditions, and support for initiative and creativity. He analyzed the accessibility of library services and the provision of free assistance for scientific activities. He refers to the library as "the pride of the region" and emphasized the need for increased funding for its maintenance. To support his proposals, he presented the positive experiences of Western Europe, highlighting the local governing bodies' and public's understanding of the importance of public libraries, the establishment of libraries at the community's request, and relevant legislative acts on public libraries. He notes their prime locations and free access. He also cited the positive experiences of the USA, where each state had a state library, many libraries were established through private donations, and there was a high rate of book publishing.

He viewed the high level of societal readiness for the spread of library services, enlightenment, education, and cultural development as a model for implementation in his own country. In "On the Necessity of Building a House for the Kharkiv Public Library," he reflected on the historical creation of the public library in Kharkiv in the 1830s and identified a lack of readiness in the local community at that time as a major reason for its neglect. However, he predicted the rise of the library movement and increased interest in reading among his compatriots in the future.

Dmytro Bahalii considered one of the main tasks for the Kharkiv Public Library to be its educational function. He discussed this in works such as "On the Educational Significance of the Kharkiv Public Library" and "Speech at the Opening of a Branch Office of the Kharkiv Public Library." To achieve this goal, he advocated for opening a cheap third tier, operating a season ticket system, establishing branch offices (especially in working areas), and ensuring the universality of the library's collection. He believed that the library's diverse collection of artistic, popular science, and scientific literature helped readers develop intellectually and spiritually, enabling them to attain higher educational levels.

Recognizing the educational role of the Kharkhiv Public Library in various works ("On the Necessity of Building a House for the Kharkiv Public Library," "On the Educational Significance of the Kharkiv Public Library," "Report on the Establishment of the Department of Manuscripts and Autographs," "Note by D. I. Bagalei on the Tasks of the Kharkiv Public Library"), Dmytro Ivanovych emphasized the importance of the library's scientific functions. He stressed the need to expand scientific departments, replenish the collection with scientific literature, and form collections of rare publications, describing the HGB as a serious book repository. He highlighted the importance of correctly selecting books, especially scientific ones, and ensuring the collection's completeness and systematic replenishment. He believed that involving specialists from various fields of knowledge in this process was crucial for quality staffing. The selection of books for the HGB collection was overseen by the Board, which considered proposals from subscribers, reading room users, and staff of the third-tier library. The issue of purchasing books was also discussed ("About Ways to Purchase Books").

=== Life after 1917 ===
Until 1917, he was a member of the Constitutional Democratic Party and the State Council. Following the February Revolution, he voluntarily handed over his mayoral seat of Kharkiv to the Socialist-Revolutionary Vladimir Karelin.

Dmitry Ivanovich viewed the revolutionary events of February–March 1917 as an opportunity for the development of Ukrainian science and culture. Thanks to his efforts and public pressure, several Ukrainian gymnasiums were opened in Kharkiv in the fall of 1917, and permanent Ukrainian language courses for teachers were established at the local commercial institute.

From 1918, he served as the chairman of the Historical and Philological Department and a member of the Presidium of the Ukrainian Academy of Sciences. In the 1920s, he taught the history of Ukraine at a higher school while simultaneously researching the history of Sloboda, Left-Bank, and Southern Ukraine in the 15th-18th centuries. He was a full member of the Archaeographic Commission of the Central Archival Administration of the Ukrainian SSR and the scientific editor of the journal Arkhivna Pravo.

Starting in the 1930s, Bahalii faced repression by the Soviets. He died of pneumonia on 9 February 1932, aged 74.

== Family ==
His wife was Maria, (née Oleksandrovych) and the couple had four children. His second-oldest child was Olga Dmitrievna Bagalei-Tatarinova, a historian.

== Legacy ==
A street in the Shevchenko district of Lviv is named after Dmytro Bahalii. In 2023 a street in Dniprovskyi District in Kyiv was also named after him.

== Works ==
- History of the Severia land until mid 14th century (Russian: «История Северской земли до половины XIV века», 1882)
- Outline of history on colonization and mode of life of steppe outskirts of the Muscovite State (Russian: «Очерки по истории колонизации й быта степной окраины Московского государства», Moscow 1887)
- Colonization of the Novorossiya Krai (Russian: «Колонизация Новороссийского Края», 1889)
- New historian of Malorossiya (Russian: «Новый историк Малороссии», 1891)
- To the history of studies about mode of life of the Old Slavic people (Russian: «К истории учений о быте древних славян», 1892)
History of Sloboda Ukraine, 1918

Outline of Ukrainian Historiography, 1923

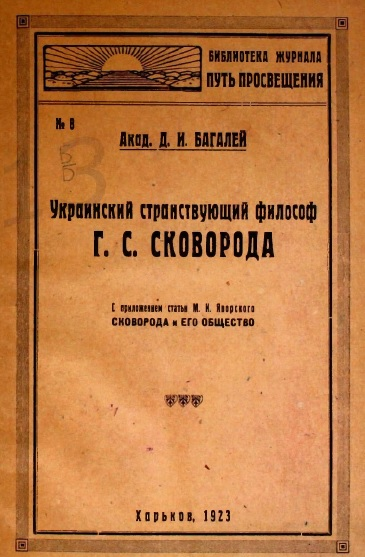
Ukraine's Wandering Philosopher: G. S. Skovoroda, 1923

== See also ==
- List of mayors of Kharkiv
