= Kharkiv =

City in Ukraine

Kharkiv Харків (Ukrainian) Харьков (Russian) Kharkov
- City

Ukrainian transcription(s)
  - National, ALA-LC, BGN/PCGN: Kharkiv
  - Scholarly: Charkiv
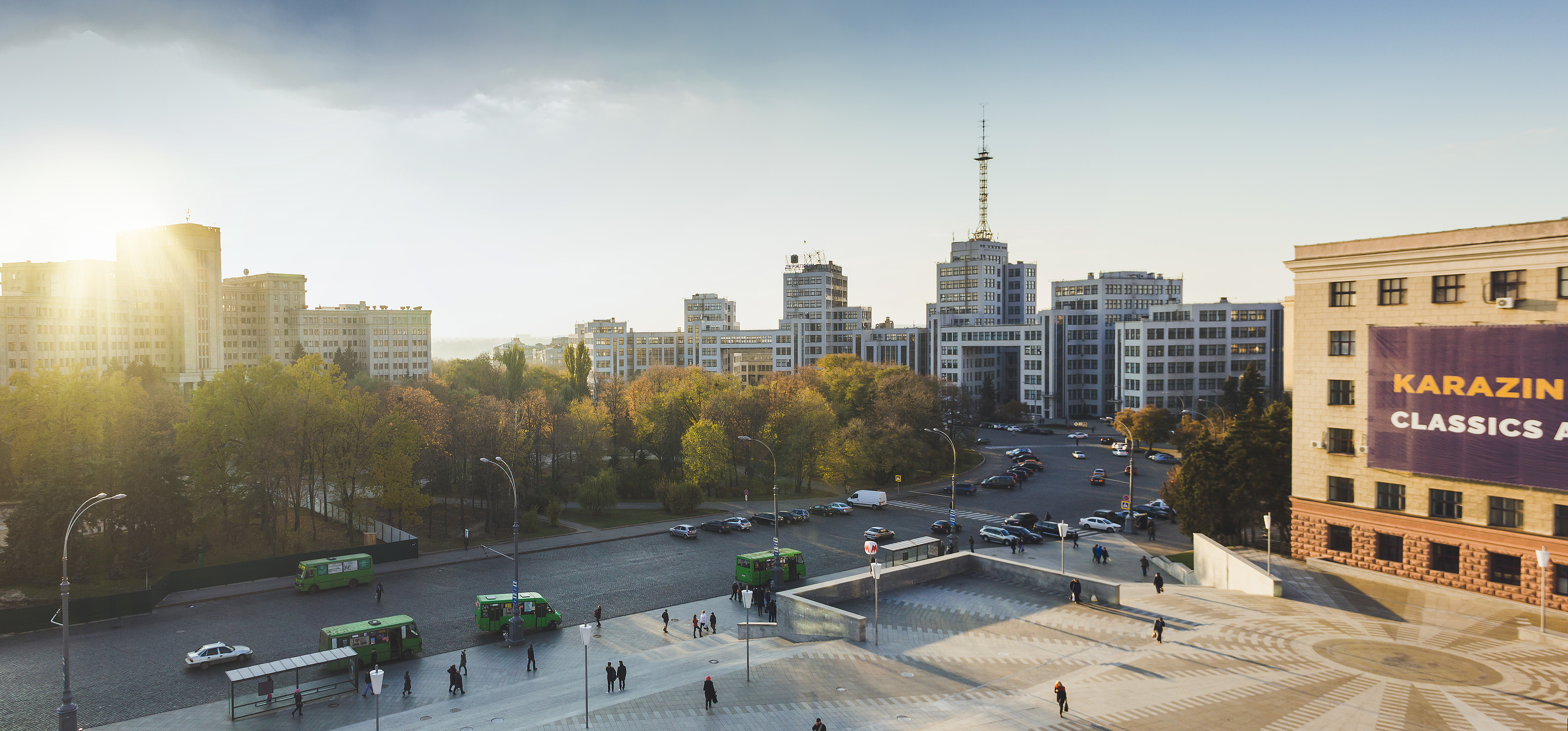
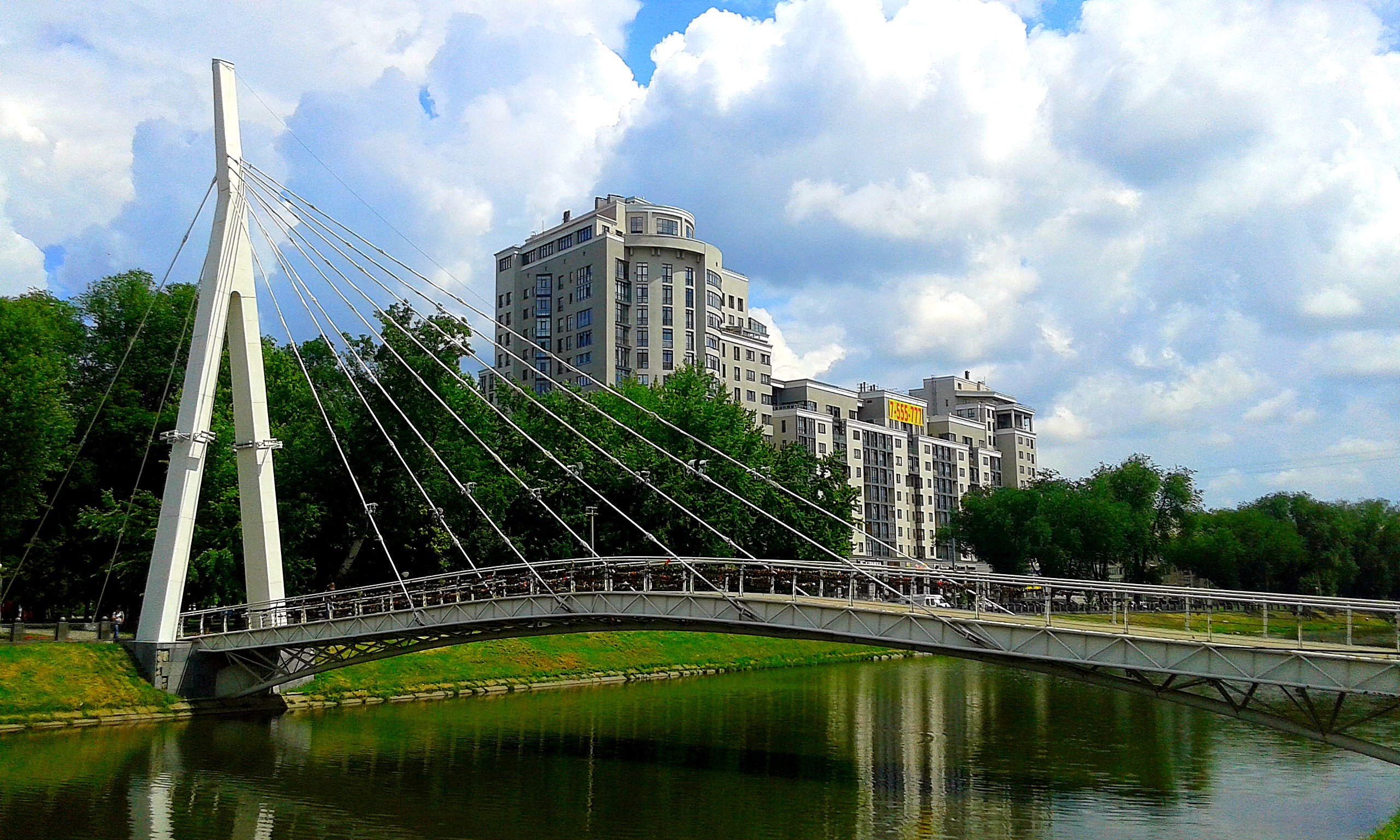
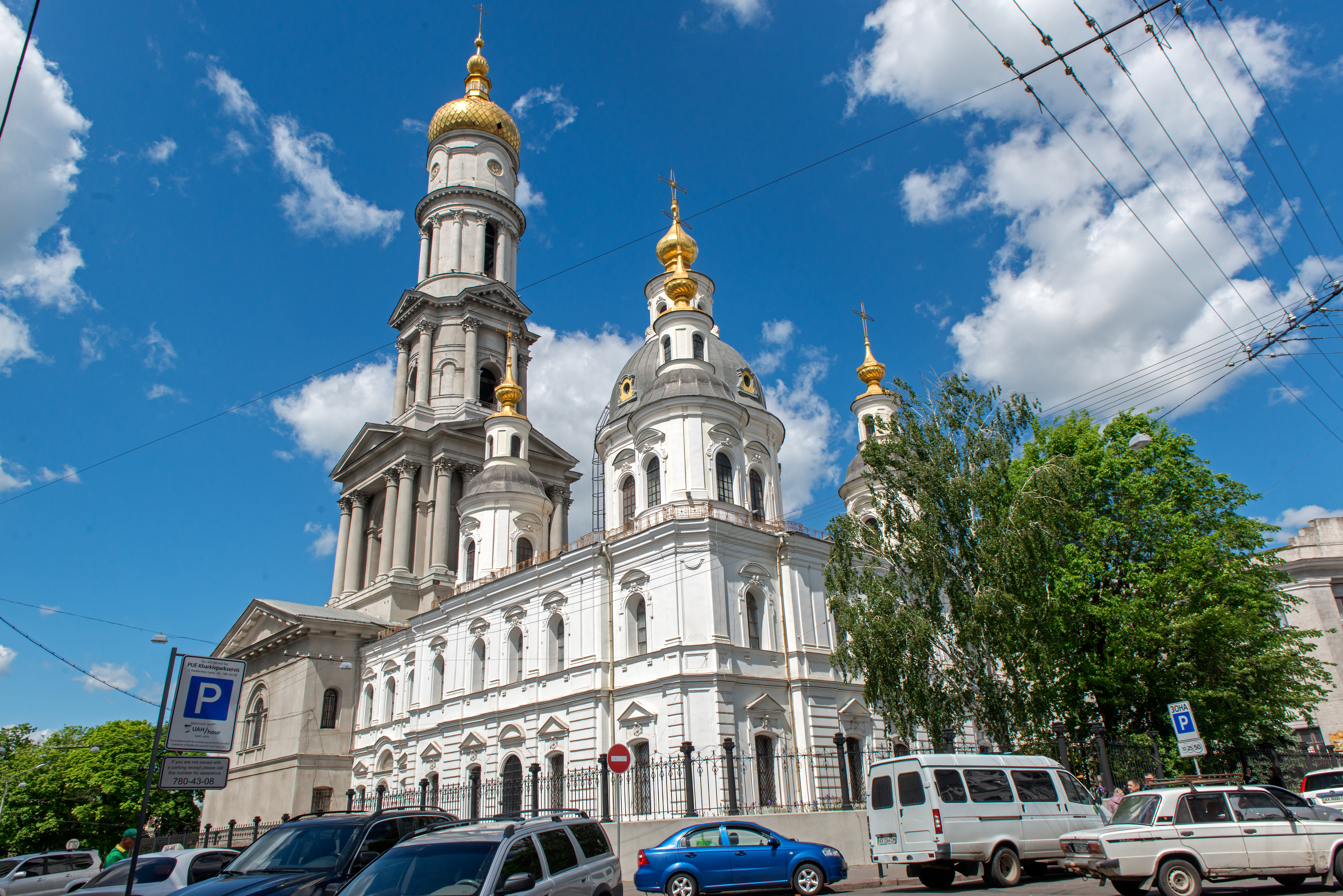
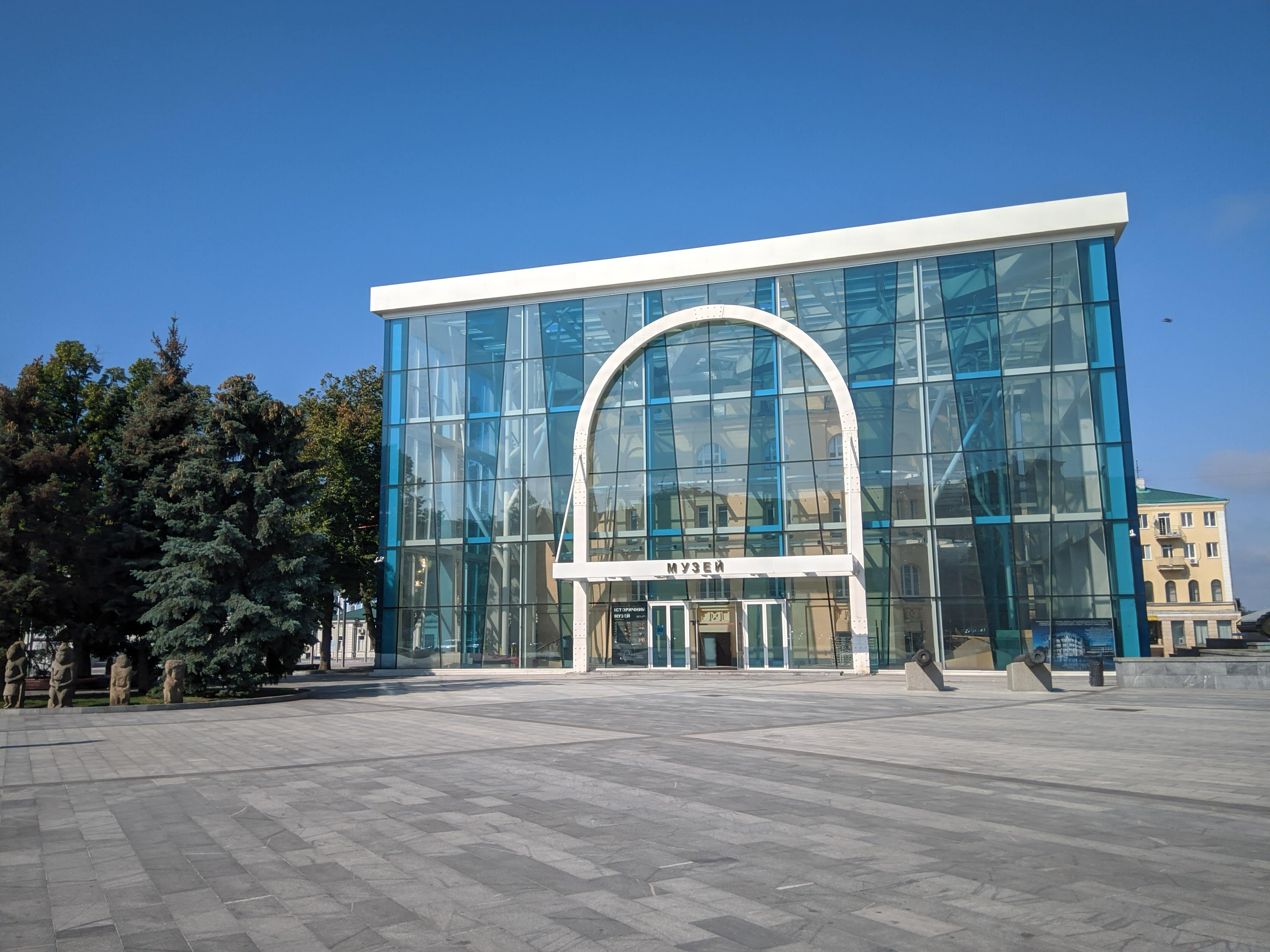
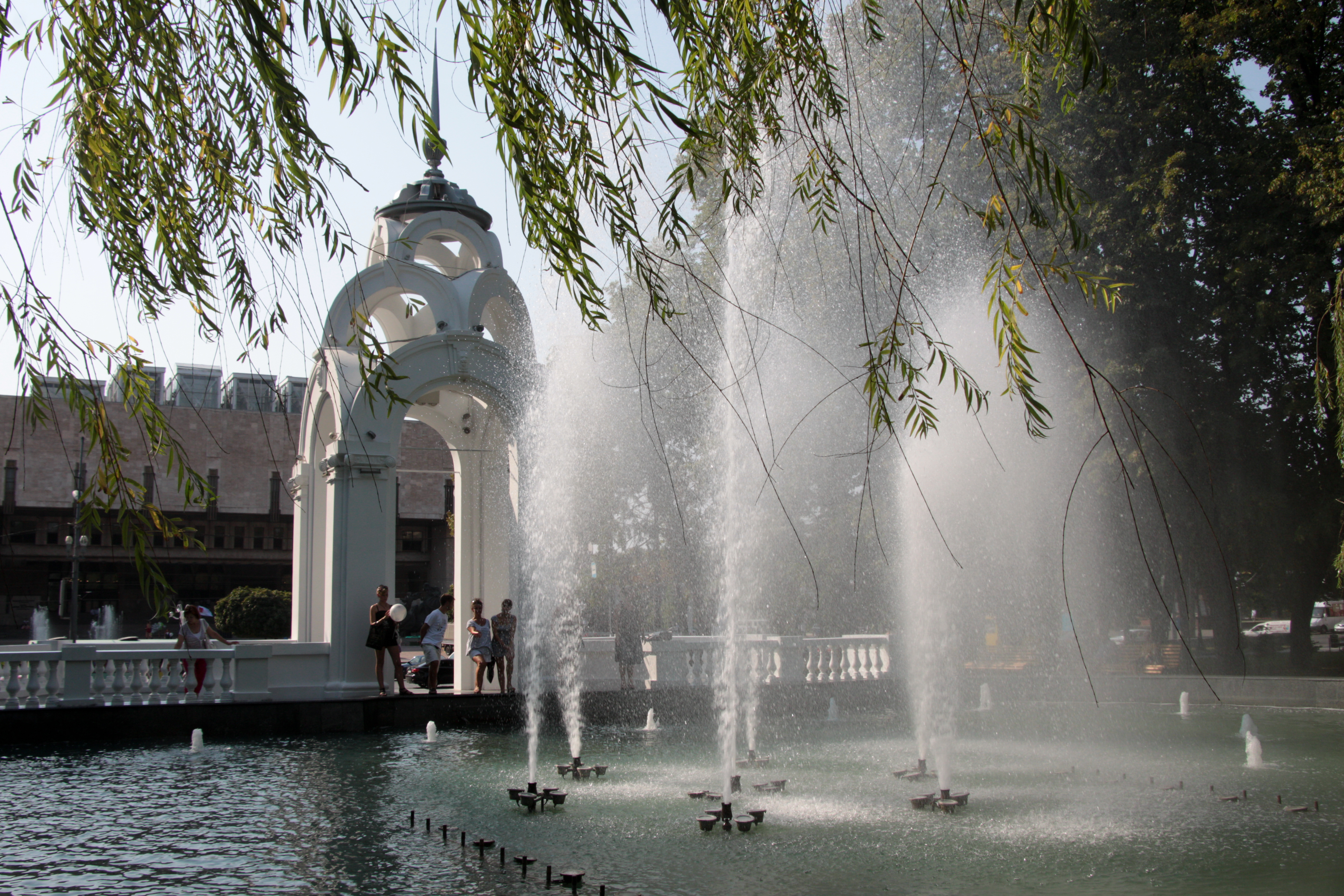
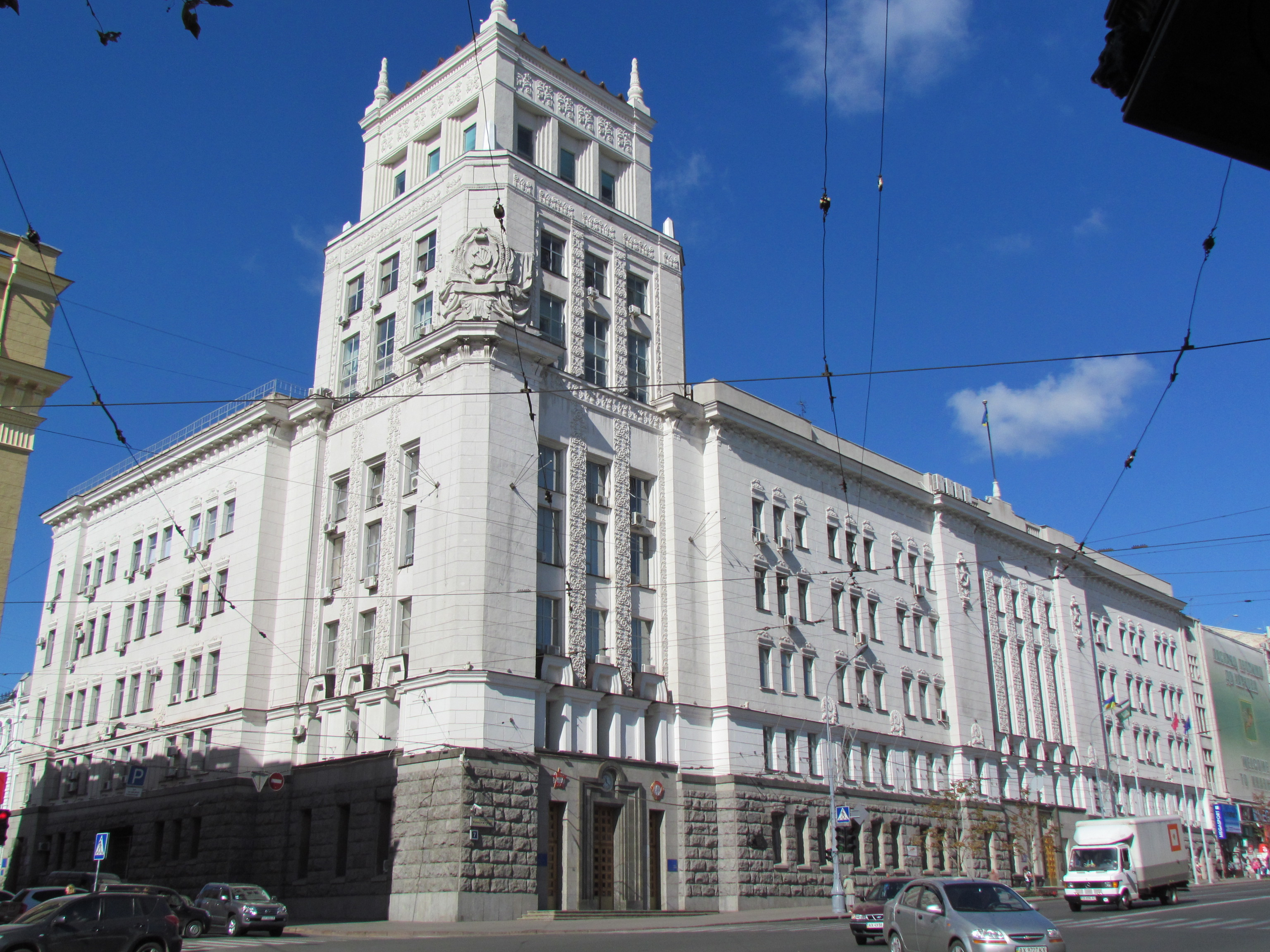
- Freedom Square with the House of Projects and Derzhprom Pedestrian bridge over the Kharkiv river Dormition Cathedral Historical Museum Fountain in front of Kharkiv Opera Kharkiv City Council Kharkiv railway station

- Flag Coat of arms Logo
- Nicknames: Smart City (official), Ferroconcrete, First Capital
- Interactive map of Kharkiv
- Location within Ukraine Location within Kharkiv Oblast Location within Europe
- Coordinates: 49°59′33″N 36°13′52″E
- Country: Ukraine
- Oblast: Kharkiv Oblast
- Raion: Kharkiv Raion
- Hromada: Kharkiv urban hromada
- Founded: 1654
- Districts: List of 9: Shevchenkivskyi District; Novobavarskyi District; Kyivskyi District; Slobidskyi District; Kholodnohirskyi District; Saltivskyi District; Nemyshlianskyi District; Industrialnyi District; Osnovianskyi District

Government
  - Mayor: Ihor Terekhov (Kernes Bloc – Successful Kharkiv)

Area
  - City: 350 km^{2} (140 sq mi)
  - Metro: 3,223 km^{2} (1,244 sq mi)
- Elevation: 152 m (499 ft)

Population (2022)
  - City: 1,421,125
  - Rank: 2nd in Ukraine
  - Density: 4,100/km^{2} (11,000/sq mi)
  - Metro: 1,729,049
- Demonym: Kharkivite

GDP (nominal, 2021)
  - City: ₴240 billion (US$8.79 billion)
  - Per capita: ₴168,880 (US$6,188.35)
- Time zone: UTC+2 (EET)
  - Summer (DST): UTC+3 (EEST)
- Postal code: 61001–61499
- License plate: AX, KX, ХА (old), 21 (old)
- Sister cities: Albuquerque, Bologna, Cincinnati, Kaunas, Lille, Nuremberg, Poznań, Tianjin, Jinan, Kutaisi, Varna, Rishon LeZion, Brno, Daugavpils
- Website: www.city.kharkiv.ua

Kharkiv, (Note: See § Etymology below.) also known as Kharkov, is the second-largest city in Ukraine. Located in the northeast of the country, it is the largest city of the historic region of Sloboda Ukraine. Kharkiv is the administrative center of Kharkiv Oblast and Kharkiv Raion. Prior to the Russian invasion of Ukraine in early 2022, it had an estimated population of 1,421,125.

Founded in 1654 as a Cossack fortress, by the late 19th century Kharkiv had developed within the Russian Empire as a major commercial and industrial center. From December 1919 to January 1934, Kharkiv was the capital of the Ukrainian Soviet Socialist Republic. During this period, migration from the distressed countryside and the relaxation of restrictions on Ukrainian cultural expression changed the city's ethnic complexion: Ukrainian replaced Russian as the largest recorded nationality, however Russian remained the dominant spoken language. The city was the focus of major battles in World War II, and under German occupation witnessed the systematic destruction of its substantial Jewish population. In the last decades of the Soviet Union, it reemerged as a major cultural, scientific, educational, transport, and industrial center.

Among the city's principal landmarks are the Annunciation and Dormition cathedrals, the Derzhprom building in Freedom Square, the Kharkiv Railway Station, the National University of Kharkiv, and the Kharkiv Tractor Factory (HTZ). Machinery, electronics and military hardware have been the leading industries.

In March and April 2014, the city saw both pro-Russia and pro-Ukrainian demonstrations, and an aborted attempt by Russian-backed separatists to seize control of the city and regional administration. Launching their full-scale invasion of Ukraine in February 2022, the Russians reached the outskirts of Kharkiv but after several weeks of fighting were forced back toward the international border. By February 2026, four years of continued Russian shelling, drone and missile attacks had reportedly destroyed a quarter of the city and driven much of public life underground.

== Etymology ==
- English: /ˈkɑːrkɪv, x-, h-/ KAR-kiv, KH-, H-; UK: /ˈkɑːrkɒv/ KAR-kov; US: /ˈkɑːrkɔːf/ KAR-kawf;
- Ukrainian: Харків, pronounced [ˈxɑrkiu̯]
- Russian: Харьков, pronounced [ˈxarʲkəf]

The city's name can be originated from its namesake river, Kharkiv. There is a folk etymology that connects the name of both the settlement and the river to a legendary Cossack founder named Kharko (a diminutive form of the Greek name Chariton, Ukrainian: Харитон, romanized: Kharyton, or Zechariah, Ukrainian: Захарій, romanized: Zakharii). But the river's name is attested earlier than the foundation of the fortress.

Kharkov, the transliteration of the name from Russian, was the traditional standard English spelling of the city's name favored prior to Ukraine's independence in 1991 (similar to the spelling of Kiev versus Kyiv).

Like all other cities across the country, Kharkiv became the internationally standardized Latin-alphabet transliteration of the Ukrainian name according to the Ukrainian National romanization system, which was adopted for official use by Ukraine's cabinet in 2010, approved by the UN Group of Experts on Geographical Names in 2012, and adopted by the BGN/PCGN in 2019. This spelling appears in Encyclopædia Britannica and in dictionaries as the spelling for the Ukrainian city. The spelling Kharkiv has also been adopted as the Library of Congress Name Authority Heading. As noted by the Christian Science Monitor, many in the English-language media outlets historically spelled the city Kharkov, even after changing the spelling of Kiev to Kyiv, but since the beginning of Russia's 2022 invasion of Ukraine more outlets and style guides have been shifting away from Russian transliterations.

== History ==
Timeline of Kharkiv

- Russian Tsardom/Empire
  ( as part of Kharkiv Regiment) 1654–1765
- Russian Empire 1765–1917
- Ukrainian War of Independence
  - Russian Provisional Government Mar–Nov 1917
  - Ukrainian People's Republic Nov–Dec 1917
  - UPRS Dec 1917 – Apr 1918
  - UPR/Ukrainian State Apr 1918 – Jan 1919
  - UkrSSR Jan–Jun 1919
  - AFSR Jun–Dec 1919
  - PWPGU/UkrSSR Dec 1919 – Dec 1922
- Soviet Union 1922–1941
- Second World War
  - Nazi Germany 1941–1943
  - Soviet Union Feb–Mar 1943
  - Nazi Germany Mar–Sep 1943
- Soviet Union 1943–1991
- Ukraine 1991–present

=== Early history ===
The earliest historical references to the region are to Scythian and Sarmatian settlement in the 2nd century BC. Between the 2nd to the 6th centuries AD there is evidence of Chernyakhov culture, a multiethnic mix of the Geto-Dacian, Sarmatian, and Gothic populations. In the 8th to 10th centuries the Khazar fortress of Verkhneye Saltovo stood about 25 miles (40 km) east of the modern city, near Staryi Saltiv. During the 12th century, the area was part of the territory of the Cumans, and then from the mid-13th century of the Mongol/Tartar Golden Horde.

By the early 17th century the area was a contested frontier region with renegade populations that had begun to organize in Cossack formations and communities defined by a common determination to resist both Tatar slavery and Polish, Lithuanian and Russian serfdom. Mid-century, the Khmelnytsky uprising against the Polish-Lithuanian Commonwealth saw the brief establishment of an independent Cossack Hetmanate.

=== Kharkiv Fortress ===
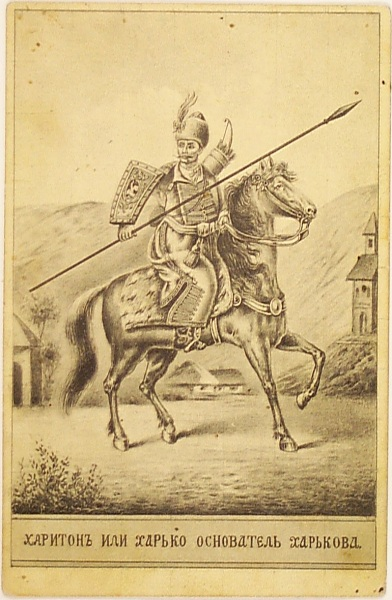
Kharkiv's alleged founder Kharko (1890s postcard).

During this period of turmoil in Right-bank Ukraine, groups of settlers arrived at the banks of the Lopan and Kharkiv rivers and, in 1654, rebuilt and fortified an abandoned settlement.

The settlement reluctantly accepted the protection and authority of a Russian voivode from Chuhuiv 40 kilometres (25 mi) to the east. The first appointed voivode from Moscow was Voyin Selifontov in 1656, who began to build a local ostrog (fort). In 1658, a new voivode, Ivan Ofrosimov, commanded the locals to kiss the cross in a demonstration of loyalty to Tsar Alexis. Led by their otaman Ivan Kryvoshlyk, they refused. However, with the election of a new otaman, Tymish Lavrynov, relations appear to have been repaired, the Tsar in Moscow granting the community's request (signed by the deans of the new Dormition Cathedral and parish churches of Annunciation and Trinity) to establish a local market.

At that time the population of Kharkiv was just over 1000, half of whom were local Cossacks. Selifontov had brought with him a Moscow garrison of only 70 soldiers. Defense rested with a local Sloboda Cossack regiment under the jurisdiction of the Razryad Prikaz, a military agency commanded from Belgorod.

The original walls of Kharkiv enclosed today's streets: Kvitky-Osnovianenko Street, Constitution Square, Pavlivskyi Square, Serhiivskyi Square, and Sobornyi Descent. There were 10 towers of which the tallest, Vestovska, was some 16 metres (52 ft) high. In 1689 the fortress was expanded to include the Intercession Cathedral and Monastery, which became a seat of a local church hierarch, the Protopope.

=== Russian Empire ===
Administrative reforms led to Kharkiv being governed from 1708 from Kyiv, and from 1727 from Belgorod. In 1765 Kharkiv was established as the seat of a separate Sloboda Ukraine Governorate.

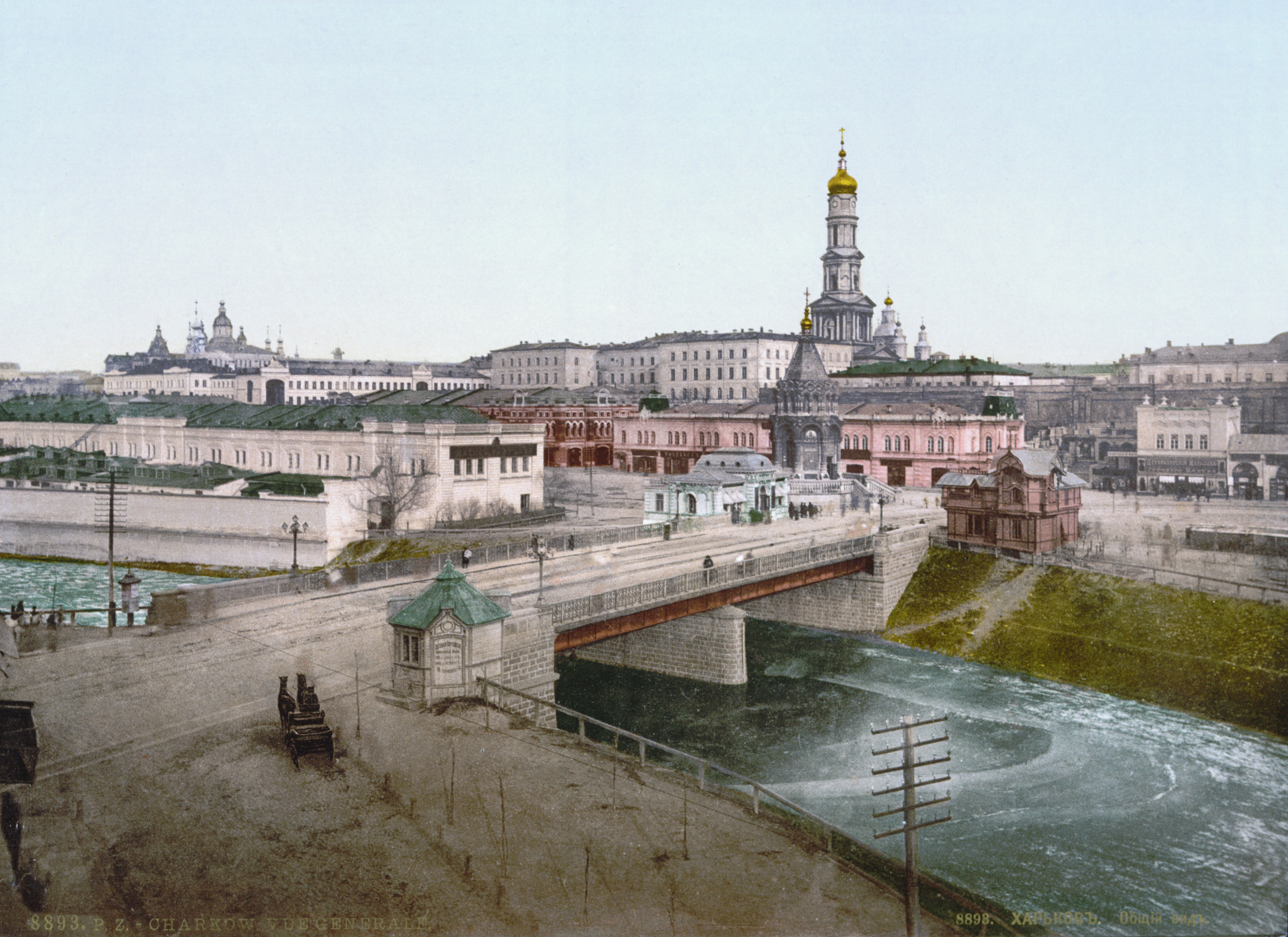
A 19th-century view of Kharkiv, with the belltower of the Dormition Cathedral dominating the skyline The first railway station in Kharkiv, built in 1869

Kharkiv University was established in 1805 in the Palace of Governorate-General. Alexander Mickiewicz, brother of the Polish national poet Adam Mickiewicz, was a professor of law in the university, while another celebrity, Goethe, searched for instructors for the school. One of its later graduates was the Ukrainian poet and writer Ivan Franko, to whom it awarded a doctorate in Russian linguistics in 1906.

The streets were first cobbled in the city center in 1830. In 1844 the 90 metres (300 ft) tall Alexander Bell Tower, commemorating the victory over Napoleon I in 1812, was built next to the first Dormition Cathedral (later to be transformed by the Soviet authorities into a radio tower). A system of running water was established in 1870.

In the course of the 19th century, although predominantly Russian speaking, Kharkiv became a center of Ukrainian culture. The first Ukrainian newspaper was published in the city in 1812. Soon after the Crimean War, in 1860–61, a hromada was established in the city, one of a network of secret societies that laid the groundwork for the appearance of a Ukrainian national movement. Its most prominent member was the philosopher, linguist and pan-slavist activist Oleksandr Potebnia. Members of a student hromada in the city included the future national leaders Borys Martos and Dmytro Antonovych, and reputedly were the first to employ the slogan "Glory to Ukraine!" and its response "Glory on all of earth!".

In 1900, the student hromada founded the Revolutionary Ukrainian Party (RUP), which sought to unite all Ukrainian national elements, including the growing number of socialists. Following the revolutionary events 1905 in which Kharkiv distinguished itself by avoiding a reactionary pogrom against its Jewish population, the RUP in Kharkiv, Poltava, Kyiv, Nizhyn, Lubny, and Yekaterinodar repudiated the more extreme elements of Ukrainian nationalism. Adopting the Erfurt Program of German Social Democracy, they restyled themselves as the Ukrainian Social Democratic Labour Party (USDLP). This was to remain independent of, and opposed by, the Bolshevik faction of the Russian SDLP.

=== Revolution and war of independence ===
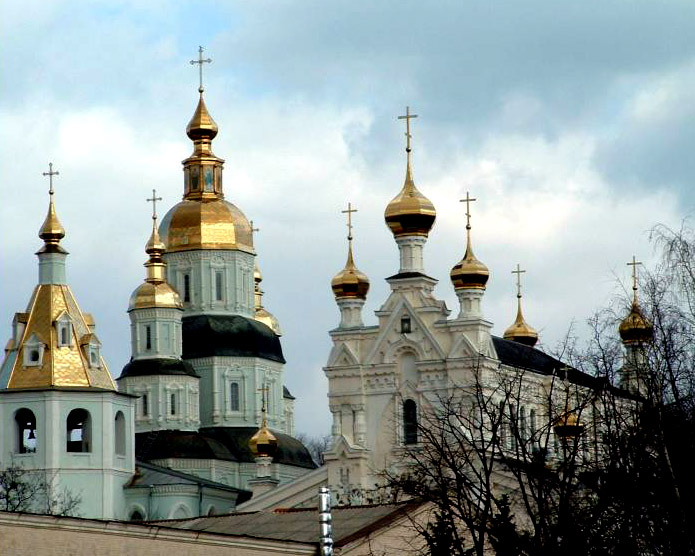
The Intercession Cathedral with bell tower and Ozerianska church (right) built in 1689

After the February Revolution of 1917, the USDLP was the main party in the first Ukrainian government, the General Secretariat of Ukraine. The Tsentralna Rada (central council) of Ukrainian parties in Kyiv authorized the Secretariat to negotiate national autonomy with the Russian Provisional Government. In the succeeding months, as wartime conditions deteriorated, the USDLP lost support in Kharkiv and elsewhere to the Ukrainian Socialist Revolutionary Party (SR) which organized both in peasant communities and in disaffected military units.

In the Russian Constituent Assembly election held in November 1917, the Bolsheviks who had seized power in Petrograd and Moscow received just 10.5 percent of the vote in the Governorate, compared to 73 percent for a bloc of Ukrainian and Russian Socialist Revolutionaries. Commanding worker, rather than peasant, votes, within the city itself the Bolsheviks won a plurality.

When in January 1918, Lenin's Council of People's Commissars disbanded the Constituent Assembly after its first sitting in Petrograd, the Tsentralna Rada in Kyiv proclaimed the independence of the Ukrainian People's Republic (UPR). Bolsheviks withdrew from Tsentralna Rada and formed their own Rada (national council) in Kharkiv. By February 1918 their forces had captured much of Ukraine.

The Bolsheviks made Kharkiv the capital of the Donetsk-Krivoy Rog Soviet Republic. Six weeks later, under the treaty terms agreed with the Central Powers at Brest-Litovsk, they abandoned the city and ceded the territory to the German-occupied Ukrainian State. On 6 March 1918, the city briefly became the seat a newly established zemlia of the Ukrainian People's Republic. On 29 April 1918 it was disbanded by Pavlo Skoropadsky, Hetman of the German-backed Ukrainian State.

=== Soviet era ===
==== Capital of Soviet Ukraine ====
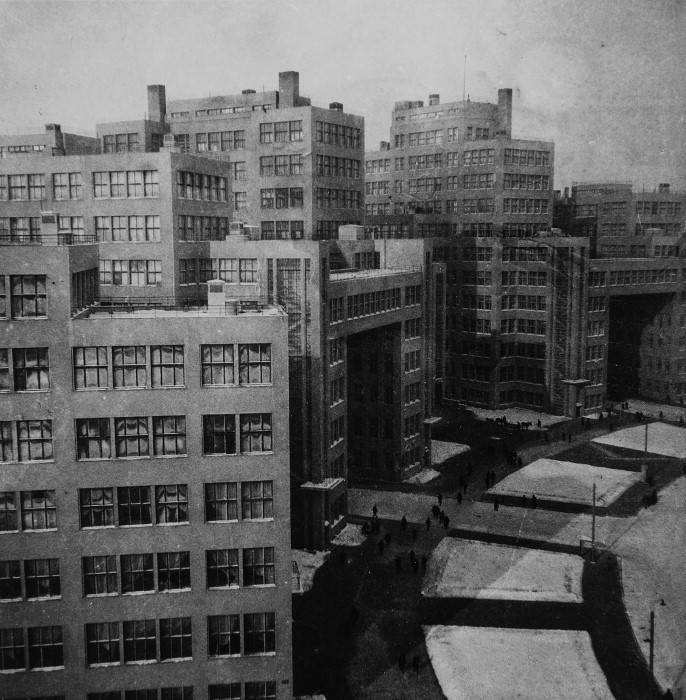
The Derzhprom (Palace of Industry) completed in 1928

After the German withdrawal in November 1918, the Red Army returned but, in June 1919, withdrew again before the advancing forces of Anton Denikin's White movement Volunteer Army. By December 1919, Soviet authority was restored. The Bolsheviks established Kharkiv as the capital of the Ukrainian Soviet Socialist Republic and, in 1922, this was formally incorporated as a constituent republic of the Soviet Union.

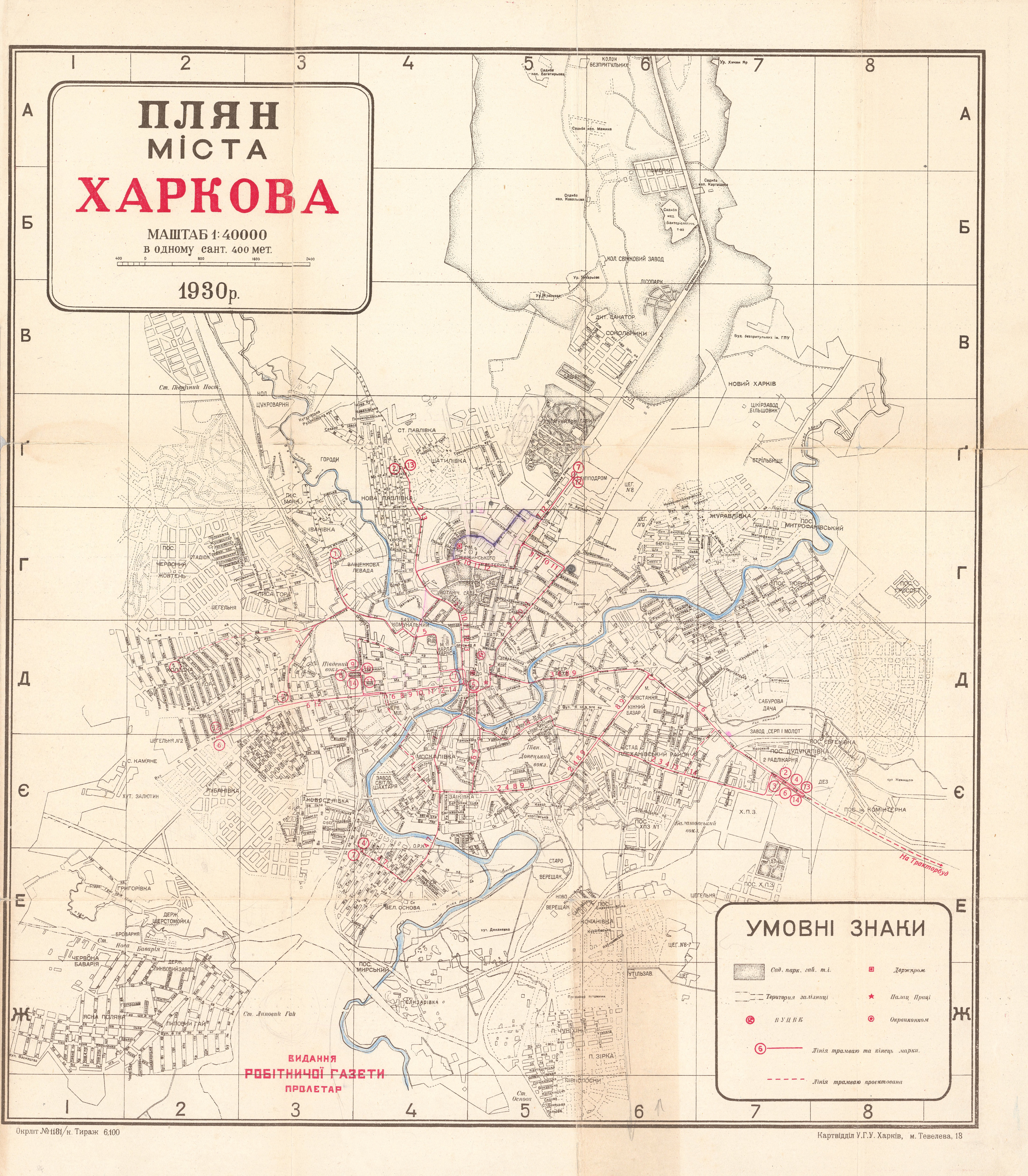
Plan of Kharkiv, 1930

In the 1920s and 30s, a number of prestige construction projects in new officially-approved Constructivist style were completed. Among these were the Derzhprom (Palace of Industry) then the tallest building in the Soviet Union (and the second tallest in Europe), the Red Army Building, the Ukrainian Polytechnic Institute of Distance Learning (UZPI), the Kharkiv City Council building, with its massive asymmetric tower, and the central department store that was opened on the 15th anniversary of the October Revolution. As new buildings were going up, many of city's historic architectural monuments were being torn down. These included most of the baroque churches: Saint Nicholas's Cathedral of the Ukrainian Autocephalous Orthodox church, the Church of the Myrrhophores, Saint Demetrius's Church, and the Cossack fortified Church of the Nativity.

Under Stalin's First Five Year Plan, the city underwent intensified industrialization, led by a number of national projects. Chief among these were the Kharkiv Tractor Factory (HTZ), described by Stalin as "a steel bastion of the collectivisation of agriculture in the Ukraine", and the Malyshev Factory, an enlargement of the old Kharkiv Locomotive Factory, which at its height employed 60,000 workers in the production of heavy equipment. By 1937, the output of Kharkiv's industries was reported as being 35 times greater than in 1913.

Since the turn of the century, the influx of new workers from the countryside changed the ethnic composition of Kharkiv. According to census returns, by 1939, the Russian share of the population had fallen from almost two-thirds to one third, while the Ukrainian share rose from a quarter to almost half. The Jewish population rose from under six percent of the total, to over 15 percent (sustaining a Hebrew secondary school, a popular Jewish university and extensive publication in Yiddish and Hebrew).

Starved peasants on the street during the Holodomor (1933)

In the 1920s, the Ukrainian SSR promoted the use of the Ukrainian language, mandating it for all schools. In practice the share of secondary schools teaching in the Ukrainian language remained lower than the ethnic Ukrainian share of the Kharkiv Oblast's population. The Ukrainization policy was reversed, with the prosecution in Kharkiv in 1930 of the Union for the Freedom of Ukraine. Hundreds of Ukrainian intellectuals were arrested and deported.

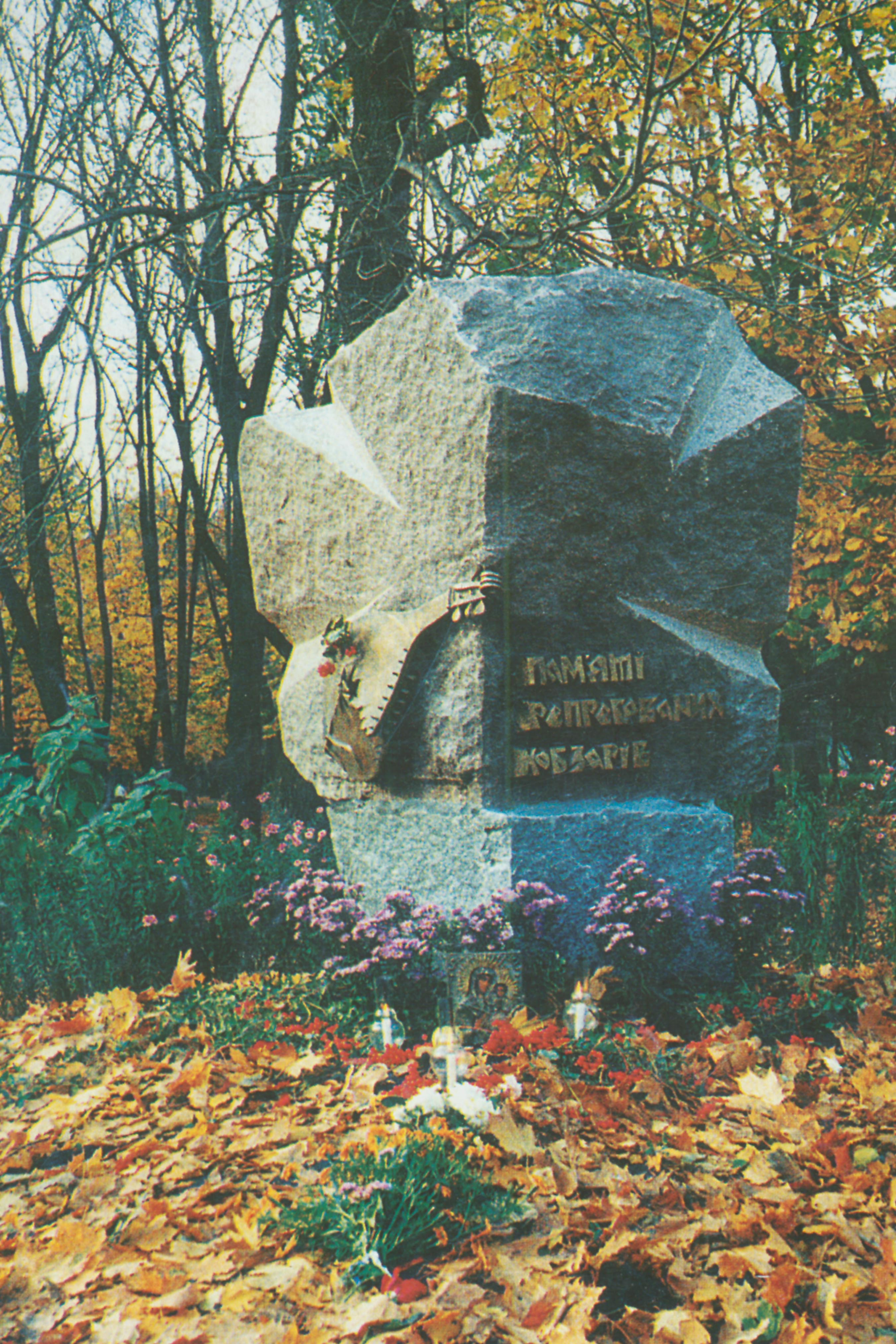
A monument to the persecuted kobzars

In 1932 and 1933, the combination of grain seizures and the forced collectivization of peasant holdings created famine conditions (the Holodomor), driving people off the land and into Kharkiv and other cities in search of food. Eye-witness accounts by westerners — among them those of American Communist Fred Beal employed in the Kharkiv Tractor Factory — were cited in the international press but, until the era of Glasnost were consistently denounced in the Soviet Union as fabrications.

In 1934, hundreds of Ukrainian writers, intellectuals and cultural workers were arrested and executed in an attempt to eradicate all vestiges of Ukrainian nationalism. The purges continued into 1938. Blind Ukrainian street musicians were rounded up in Kharkiv and murdered by the NKVD. Confident in his control over Ukraine, in January 1934 Stalin had the capital of the Ukrainian SSR moved from Kharkiv to Kyiv.

During April and May 1940, about 3,900 Polish prisoners in Starobilsk camp were executed in the Kharkiv NKVD building, later secretly buried on the grounds of an NKVD pansionat in Piatykhatky forest (part of the Katyn massacre) on the outskirts of Kharkiv. The site also contains numerous bodies of Ukrainian cultural workers arrested and shot during the 1937–38 Stalinist purges.

==== German occupation ====
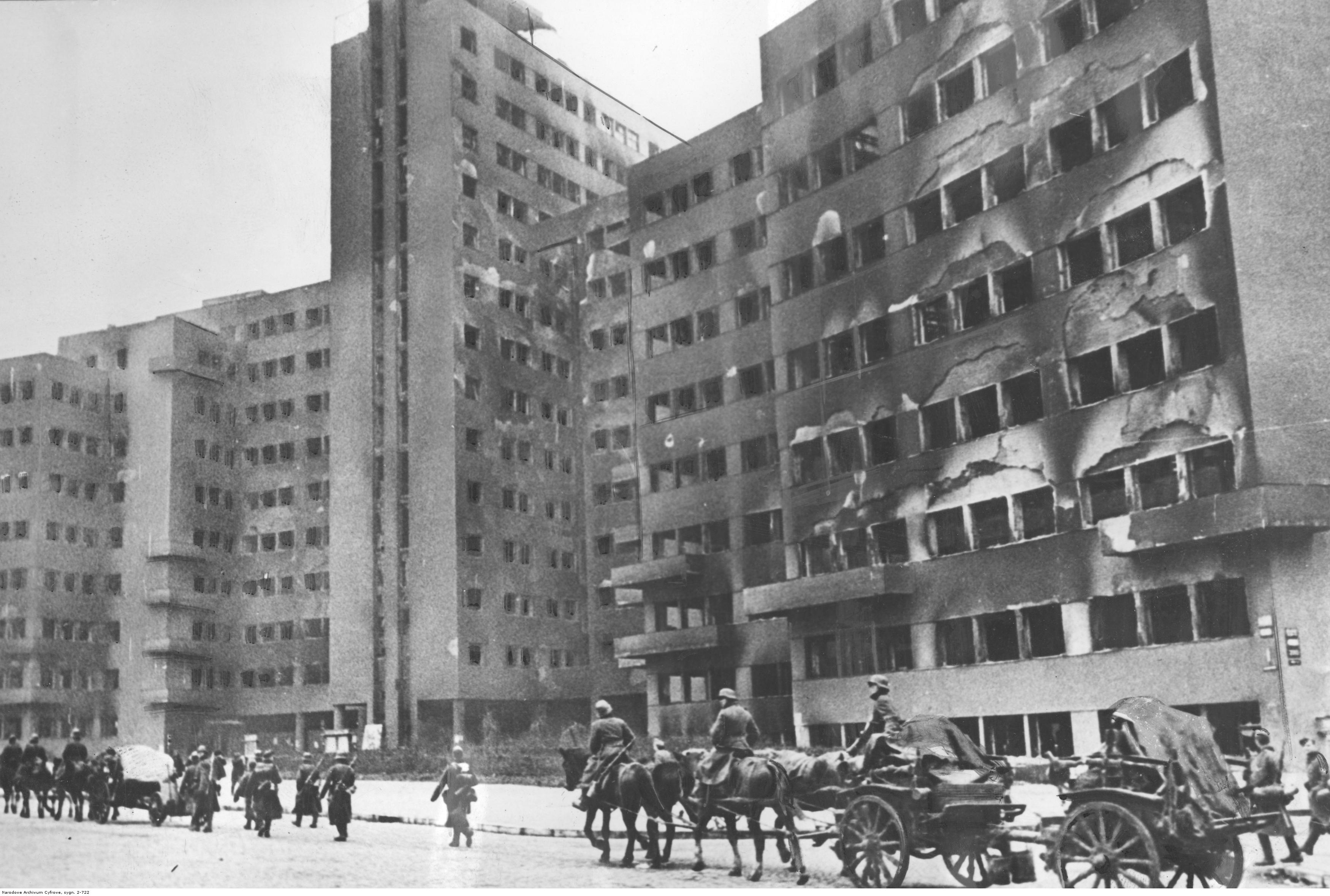
German troops entering Kharkiv in 1941

During World War II, Kharkiv was the focus of major battles. The city was captured by Nazi Germany on 24 October 1941. A disastrous Red Army offensive failed to recover the city in May 1942. It was retaken (Operation Star) on 16 February 1943, but again lost to the Germans on 15 March 1943. 23 August 1943 saw a final liberation.

On the eve of the occupation, Kharkiv's pre-war population of 700,000 had been doubled by the influx of refugees. What remained of the pre-war Jewish population of 130,000 were slated by the Germans for "special treatment". Between December 1941 and January 1942, they massacred and buried an estimated 15,000 Jews in a ravine outside of town named Drobytsky Yar. Over their 22 months' occupation the Germans executed a further 30,000 residents, among them suspected Soviet partisans and, after a brief period of toleration, Ukrainian nationalists. 80,000 people died of hunger, cold and disease. 60,000 were forcibly transported to Germany as slave workers (Ostarbeiter).

By the time of Kharkiv's liberation in August 1943, the surviving population had been reduced to under 200,000. Seventy percent of the city had been destroyed. According to a New York Times piece, "The city was more battered than perhaps any other in the Soviet Union save Stalingrad."

==== Post-World War II ====
Before the occupation, Kharkiv's tank industries had been evacuated to the Urals with all their equipment, and became the heart of Red Army's tank programs, particularly the Kharkiv-designed T-34. These enterprises returned to Kharkiv after the war, and became central elements of the post-war Soviet military industrial complex. Houses and factories were rebuilt, and much of the city's center was reconstructed in the style of Stalinist Classicism. Kharkiv's Jewish community revived after World War II: by 1959 there were 84,000 Jews living in the city. However, Soviet anti-Zionism restricted expressions of Jewish religion and culture, and was sustained until the final Gorbachev years. The confiscated Kharkiv Choral Synagogue reopened as a synagogue in 1990.

Mirror Stream fountain

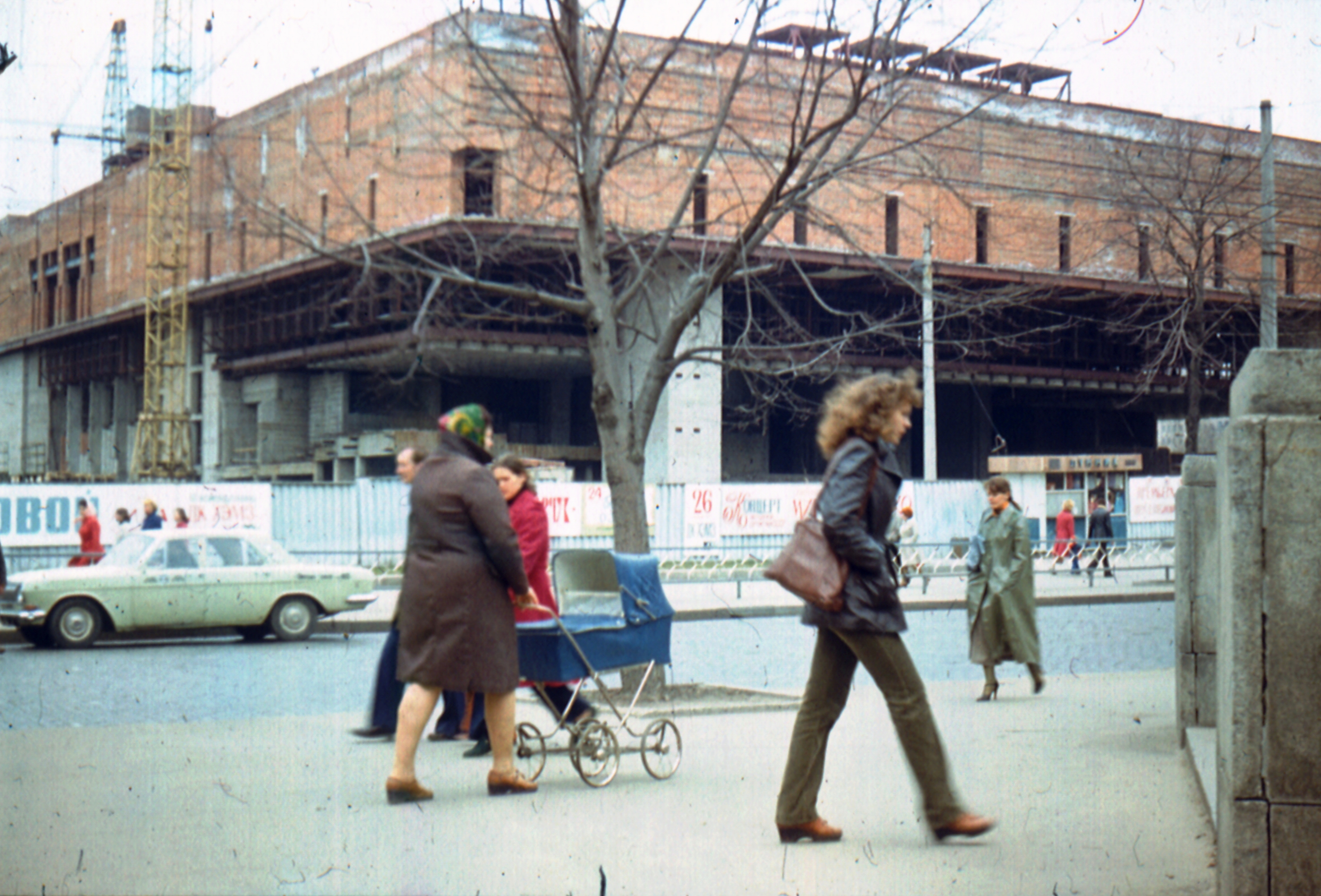
Kharkiv in 1981

In the Brezhnev era, Kharkiv was promoted as a "model Soviet city". Propaganda made much of its "youthfulness", a designation broadly used to suggest the relative absence in the city of "material and spiritual relics" from the pre-revolutionary era, and its commitment to the new frontiers of Soviet industry and science. The city's machine-and-weapons building prowess was attributed to a forward-looking collaboration between its large-scale industrial enterprises and new research institutes and laboratories.

The last Communist Party chief of Ukraine, Vladimir Ivashko, appointed in 1989, trained as a mining engineer and served as a party functionary in Kharkiv. He led the Communists to victory in Kharkiv and across the country in the parliamentary election held in the Ukrainian SSR in March 1990. The election was relatively free, but occurred well before organized political parties had time to form, and did not arrest the decline in the CPSU's legitimacy. This was accelerated by the intra-party coup attempt against President Mikhail Gorbachev and his reforms on 18 August 1991, during which Ivashko temporarily replaced Gorbachev as CPSU General Secretary.

The National University of Kharkiv was at the forefront of democratic agitation. In October 1991, a call from Kyiv for an all-Ukrainian university strike to protest Gorbachev's new Union Treaty and to call for new multi-party elections was met with a rally at the entrance to the university attended not only by students and university teachers, but also by a range of public and cultural figures. The protests — the so-called Revolution on Granite — ended on 17 October with a resolution of the Verkhovna Rada of the Ukrainian SSR promising further democratic reform. In the event, the only demand fulfilled was the removal of the Communist Prime Minister.

=== Independent Ukraine ===
In the 1 December 1991 Referendum on the Act of Declaration of Independence, on a turnout of 76 percent, 86 percent of the Kharkiv Oblast approved separate Ukrainian statehood.

During the 1990s post-Soviet aliyah, many Jews emigrated to Israel or to Western countries. The city's Jewish population, 62,800 in 1970, dropped to 50,000 by the end of the century.

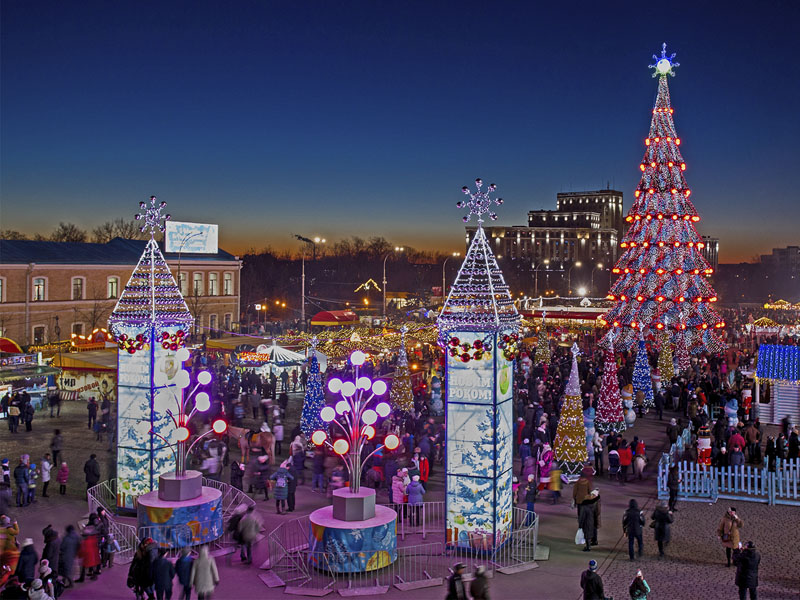
New Year's decoration of Freedom Square in Kharkiv in 2018

The collapse of the Soviet Union disrupted, but did not sever, the ties that bound Kharkiv's heavy industries to the integrated Soviet market and supply chains, and did not diminish dependency on Russian oil, minerals, and gas. In Kharkiv and elsewhere in eastern Ukraine, the limited prospects for securing new economic partners in the West, and concern for the rights of Russian-speakers in the new national state, combined to promote the interests of political parties and candidates emphasizing understanding and cooperation with the Russian Federation. In the new century, these were represented by the Party of Regions and by the presidential ambitions of Victor Yanukovych, which in Kharkiv triumphed in the city council elections of 2006, in the parliamentary elections of 2007 and in the presidential elections of 2010.

Although never attaining the level of protest witnessed in Kyiv and in communities further west, following the disputed 2012 Parliamentary elections public opposition to President Yanukovych and his party surfaced in Kharkiv amid accusations of systematic corruption and of sabotaging prospects for new ties to the European Union.

==== Pro-Russian unrest and violence ====
The Euromaidan protests in the winter of 2013–2014 against then president Viktor Yanukovych consisted of daily gatherings of about 200 protestors near the statue of Taras Shevchenko and were predominantly peaceful. Disappointed at the turnout, an activist at Kharkiv University suggested that his fellow students "proved to be as much of an inert, grey and cowed mass as Kharkiv's ‘biudzhetniki’ " (those whose income derives from the state budget, mostly public servants). But Pro-Yanukovych demonstrations, held near the statue of Lenin in Freedom (previously Dzerzhinsky) Square, were similarly small.

In the wake of Yanukovych's ouster in February, there were attempts in Kharkiv to follow the example of separatists in neighboring Donbas. On 2 March 2014, a Russian "tourist" from Moscow replaced the Ukrainian flag with a Russian flag on the Kharkiv Regional State Administration Building. On 6 April 2014 pro-Russian protesters occupied the building and unilaterally declared independence from Ukraine as the "Kharkiv People's Republic". Doubts arose about their local origin as they had initially targeted the city's Opera and Ballet Theatre before recognizing their mistake.

Kharkiv's mayor, Hennadiy "Gepa" Kernes, elected in 2010 as the nominee of the Party of Regions, was placed under house arrest. Claiming to have been "prisoner of Yanukovych's system", he now declared his loyalty to acting President Oleksandr Turchynov. In a televised address on 7 April, Turchynov had announced that "a second wave of the Russian Federation's special operation against Ukraine [has] started" with the "goal of destabilising the situation in the country, toppling Ukrainian authorities, disrupting the elections, and tearing our country apart". Kernes persuaded the police to storm the regional administration building and push out the separatists. He was allowed to return to his mayoral duties.

Police action against the separatists was reinforced by a special forces unit from Vinnytsia directed by Ukrainian Interior Minister Arsen Avakov and Stepan Poltorak the acting commander of the Ukrainian Internal Forces. On 13 April, some pro-Russian protesters again made it inside the Kharkiv regional state administration building, but were quickly evicted. Violent clashes resulted in the severe beating of at least 50 pro-Ukrainian protesters in attacks by pro-Russian protesters.

On 28 April, Kernes was shot by a sniper, a victim, commentators suggested, of his former pro-Russian allies. Following recovery from his wounds, he was twice been re-elected, but in December 2020 died of COVID-19 related complications. Kernes was succeeded as mayor by Ihor Terekhov of the "Kernes Bloc — Successful Kharkiv".

Relatively peaceful demonstrations continued to be held, with "pro-Russian" rallies gradually diminishing and "pro-Ukrainian unity" demonstrations growing in numbers. On 28 September 2014, activists dismantled Ukraine's largest monument to Lenin at a pro-Ukrainian rally in the central square. Polls conducted from September to December 2014 found little support in Kharkiv for joining Russia.

From early November until mid-December, Kharkiv was struck by seven non-lethal bomb blasts. Targets of these attacks included a rock pub known for raising money for Ukrainian forces, a hospital for Ukrainian forces, a military recruiting center, and a National Guard base. According to SBU investigator Vasyliy Vovk, Russian covert forces were behind the attacks, and had intended to destabilize the otherwise calm city of Kharkiv. Attacks continued into 2015, including a bombing that killed four people during a march commemorating the Euromaidan victims.

After the Euromaidan events and Russian actions in the Crimea and Donbas ruptured relations with Moscow, the Kharkiv region experienced a sharp fall in output and employment. Once a hub of cross border trade, Kharkiv was turned into a border fortress. A reorientation to new international markets, increased defense contracts (after Kyiv, the region contains the second-largest number of military-related enterprises) and export growth in the economy's services sector helped fuel a recovery, but people's incomes did not return to pre-2014 levels.

By 2018 Kharkiv officially has the lowest unemployment rate in Ukraine, 6 percent. But in part this reflected labor shortages caused by the steady outflow of young and skilled workers to Poland and other European countries.

Until 18 July 2020, Kharkiv was incorporated as a city of oblast significance and served as the administrative center of Kharkiv Raion though it did not belong to the raion. In July 2020, as part of the administrative reform of Ukraine, which reduced the number of raions of Kharkiv Oblast to seven, the city of Kharkiv was merged into Kharkiv Raion.

==== 2022 Russian invasion ====
During the 2022 Russian invasion of Ukraine, Kharkiv was the site of heavy fighting between the Ukrainian and Russian forces. On 27 February, the governor of Kharkiv Oblast Oleh Syniehubov claimed that Russian troops were repelled from Kharkiv.

According to a 28 February 2022, report from Agroportal 24h, the Kharkiv Tractor Plant (KhTZ), in the south east of the city, was destroyed and "engulfed in fire" by "massive shelling" from Russian forces. Video purported to record explosions and fire at the plant on 25 and 27 February 2022. UNESCO has confirmed that in the first three weeks of bombardment the city experienced the loss or damage of at least 27 major historical buildings.

On 4 March 2022, Human Rights Watch reported that on the fourth day of the invasion of Ukraine by the Russian Federation, 28 February 2022, Federation forces used cluster munitions in the KhTZ, the Saltivskyi and Shevchenkivskyi districts of the city. The rights group — which noted the "inherently indiscriminate nature of cluster munitions and their foreseeable effects on civilians" — based its assessment on interviews and an analysis of 40 videos and photographs. In March 2022, during the Battle of Kharkiv, the city was designated as a Hero City of Ukraine.

In May 2022, Ukrainian forces began a counter-offensive to drive Russian forces away from the city and towards the international border. By 12 May, the United Kingdom Ministry of Defence reported that Russia had withdrawn units from the Kharkiv area. Russian artillery and rockets remain within range of the city, and it continues to suffer shelling and missile strikes.

In May 2024, after two weeks intensive fighting, and the loss of a number of border villages, Ukrainian forces halted a renewed Russian advance toward Kharkiv. The Ukrainian defense was assisted by American-supplied HIMARS missiles, and by US permission to fire these across the border at military targets within Russian territory. The Russians retaliated with missile strikes, including a glide-bomb attack that hit and destroyed an Epicentr K hypermarket killing 18 civilians.

In February 2026, the city mayor, Ihor Terekov, reported a quarter of the city had been destroyed, including 4,700 apartment buildings and 3,500 houses; that energy infrastructure was in a constant state of repair; and that "much of public life has gone underground".

== Geography ==
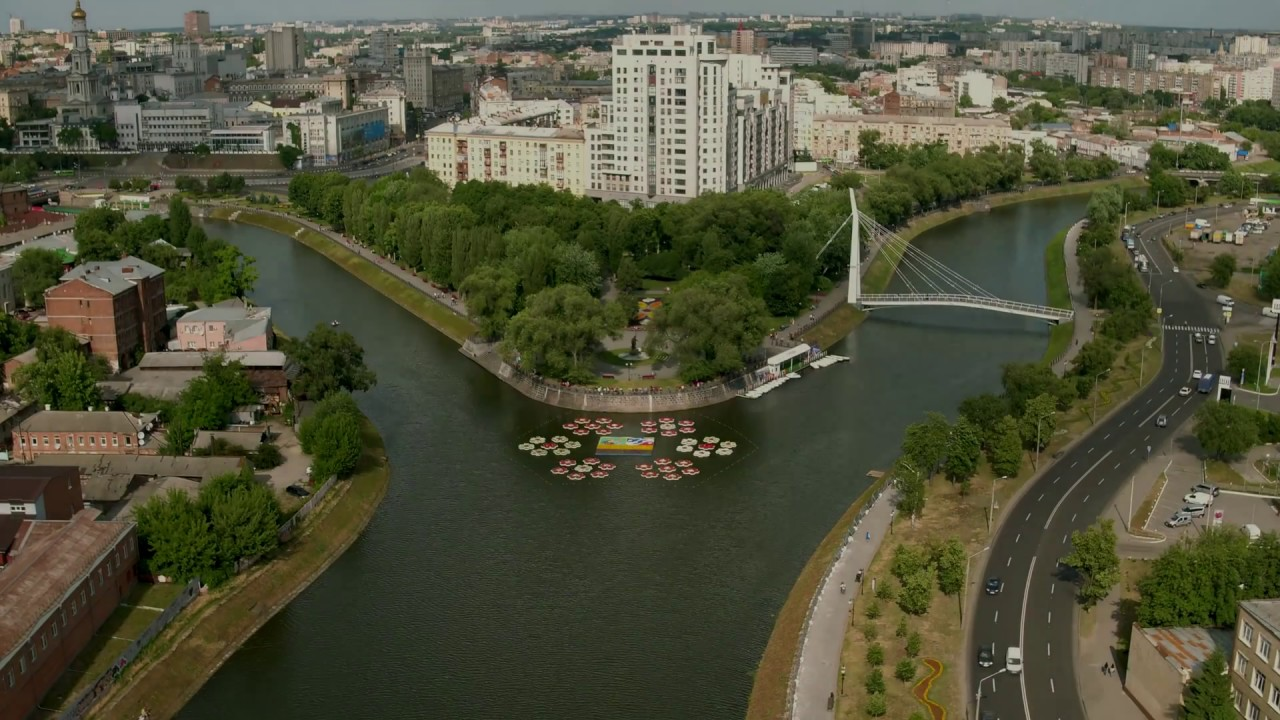
The Lopan-Kharkiv river spur

Kharkiv is located at the banks of the Kharkiv, Lopan, and Udy rivers, where they flow into the Siverskyi Donets watershed in the north-eastern region of Ukraine.

Historically, Kharkiv lies in the Sloboda Ukraine region (Slobozhanshchyna also known as Slobidshchyna) in Ukraine, in which it is considered to be the main city.

The approximate dimensions of city of Kharkiv are: from the North to the South — 24.3 km; from the West to the East — 25.2 km.

Based on Kharkiv's topography, the city can be conditionally divided into four lower districts and four higher districts.

The highest point above sea level, in Piatykhatky, is 202m, and the lowest is Novoselivka in Kharkiv is 94m.

Kharkiv lies in the large valley of rivers of Kharkiv, Lopan, Udy, and Nemyshlia. This valley lies from the North West to the South East between the Mid Russian highland and Donets lowland. All the rivers interconnect in Kharkiv and flow into the river of Northern Donets. A special system of concrete and metal dams was designed and built by engineers to regulate the water level in the rivers in Kharkiv.

Kharkiv has a large number of green city parks with a long history of more than 100 years with very old oak trees and many flowers. Central Park is Kharkiv's largest public garden. The park has nine areas: children, extreme sports, family entertainment, a medieval area, entertainment center, French park, cable car, sports grounds, retro park. This park was previously named after Maxim Gorky until June 2023 when it was renamed Central Park for Culture and Recreation.

=== Climate ===
Kharkiv's climate is humid continental (Köppen climate classification Dfa/Dfb) with long, cold, snowy winters and warm to hot summers.

The average rainfall totals 519 mm (20 in) per year, with the most in June and July.

Climate data for Kharkiv, Ukraine (1991–2020, extremes 1841–present)
Month	Jan	Feb	Mar	Apr	May	Jun	Jul	Aug	Sep	Oct	Nov	Dec	Year
Record high °C (°F)	11.1 (52.0)	14.6 (58.3)	23.7 (74.7)	30.5 (86.9)	34.5 (94.1)	39.8 (103.6)	38.4 (101.1)	39.8 (103.6)	34.5 (94.1)	29.3 (84.7)	20.3 (68.5)	13.4 (56.1)	39.8 (103.6)
Mean daily maximum °C (°F)	−2.1 (28.2)	−0.8 (30.6)	5.2 (41.4)	14.7 (58.5)	21.4 (70.5)	25.2 (77.4)	27.4 (81.3)	26.8 (80.2)	20.5 (68.9)	12.6 (54.7)	4.3 (39.7)	−0.7 (30.7)	12.9 (55.2)
Daily mean °C (°F)	−4.5 (23.9)	−3.8 (25.2)	1.4 (34.5)	9.7 (49.5)	16.1 (61.0)	20.0 (68.0)	22.0 (71.6)	21.1 (70.0)	15.1 (59.2)	8.2 (46.8)	1.6 (34.9)	−2.9 (26.8)	8.7 (47.7)
Mean daily minimum °C (°F)	−6.8 (19.8)	−6.6 (20.1)	−1.9 (28.6)	4.8 (40.6)	10.7 (51.3)	14.7 (58.5)	16.6 (61.9)	15.4 (59.7)	10.2 (50.4)	4.4 (39.9)	−0.8 (30.6)	−5.1 (22.8)	4.6 (40.3)
Record low °C (°F)	−35.6 (−32.1)	−29.8 (−21.6)	−32.2 (−26.0)	−11.4 (11.5)	−1.9 (28.6)	2.2 (36.0)	5.7 (42.3)	2.2 (36.0)	−2.9 (26.8)	−9.1 (15.6)	−20.9 (−5.6)	−30.8 (−23.4)	−35.6 (−32.1)
Average precipitation mm (inches)	37 (1.5)	33 (1.3)	36 (1.4)	32 (1.3)	54 (2.1)	58 (2.3)	63 (2.5)	39 (1.5)	44 (1.7)	44 (1.7)	39 (1.5)	40 (1.6)	519 (20.4)
Average extreme snow depth cm (inches)	8 (3.1)	11 (4.3)	8 (3.1)	1 (0.4)	0 (0)	0 (0)	0 (0)	0 (0)	0 (0)	0 (0)	1 (0.4)	4 (1.6)	11 (4.3)
Average rainy days	10	8	10	13	14	15	13	10	12	13	13	12	143
Average snowy days	19	18	12	2	0.1	0	0	0	0.03	2	9	18	80
Average relative humidity (%)	85.9	82.7	74.8	62.3	60.4	62.1	62.4	59.1	65.7	75.8	84.1	86.8	71.8
Mean monthly sunshine hours	44	68	131	187	267	289	308	286	205	123	55	36	1,999
Source 1: Pogoda.ru.net
Source 2: NCEI (humidity and sun 1991–2020)

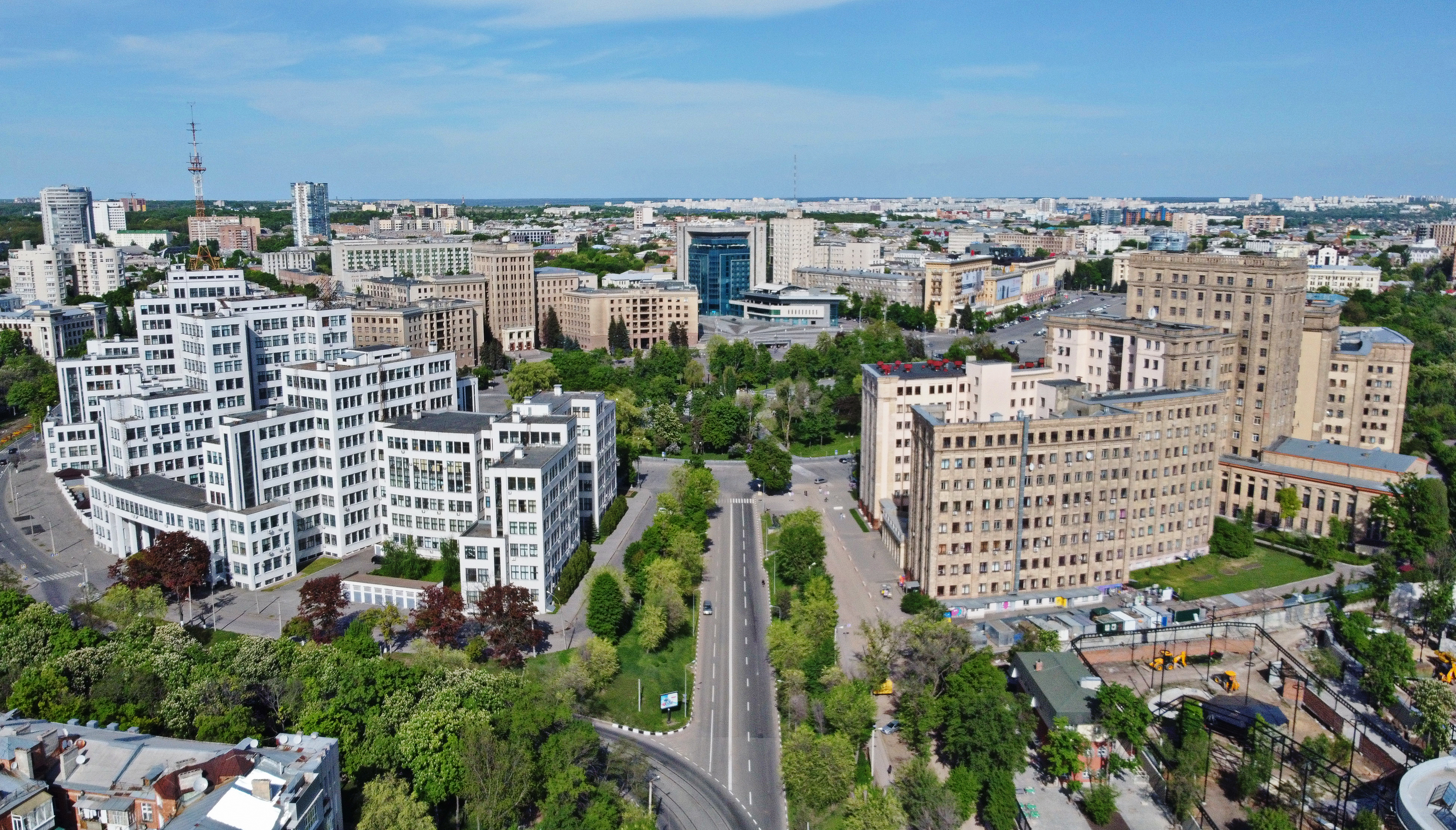
A panoramic view of the Freedom Square, with Derzhprom and the House of Projects in the foreground.

== Governance ==
=== Legal status and local government ===
The Mayor of Kharkiv and the Kharkiv City Council govern all the business and administrative affairs in the City of Kharkiv.

The mayor of Kharkiv has the executive powers; the city council has the administrative powers as far as the government issues are concerned.

The mayor of Kharkiv is elected by direct public election in Kharkiv every four years.

The city council is composed of elected representatives, who approve or reject the initiatives on the budget allocation, tasks priorities and other issues in Kharkiv. The representatives to the city council are elected every four years.

The mayor and city council hold their regular meetings in the City Hall in Kharkiv.

=== Administrative divisions ===
While Kharkiv is the administrative center of the Kharkiv Oblast (province), the city affairs are managed by the Kharkiv Municipality. Kharkiv is a city of oblast subordinance.

1. Kholodnohirskyi District; 2. Shevchenkivskyi District; 3. Kyivskyi District; 4. Saltivskyi District; 5. Nemyshlianskyi District; 6. Industrialnyi District; 7. Slobidskyi District; 8. Osnovianskyi District; 9. Novobavarskyi District

The territory of Kharkiv is divided into 9 administrative raions (districts), until February 2016 they were named for people, places, events, and organizations associated with early years of the Soviet Union but many were renamed in February 2016 to comply with decommunization laws. Also, owing to this law, over 200 streets have been renamed in Kharkiv since 20 November 2015.

The raions are named:

1. Kholodnohirskyi (Ukrainian: Холодногірський район); namesake: Kholodna Hora, a city neighborhood (formerly Leninskyi; namesake: Vladimir Lenin)
2. Shevchenkivskyi (Ukrainian: Шевченківський район); namesake: Taras Shevchenko (formerly Dzerzhynskyi; namesake Felix Dzerzhinsky)
3. Kyivskyi (Ukrainian: Київський район); namesake: Kyiv (formerly Kahanovychskyi; namesake: Lazar Kaganovich)
4. Saltivskyi (Ukrainian: Салтівський район); namesake: Saltivka residential area (formerly Moskovskyi; namesake: Moscow)
5. Nemyshlianskyi (Ukrainian: Немишлянський район); namesake: Nemyshlia river (formerly Frunzenskyi; namesake: Mikhail Frunze)
6. Industrialnyi (Ukrainian: Індустріальний район); lit. 'Industrial' (formerly Ordzhonikidzevskyi; namesake: Sergo Ordzhonikidze)
7. Slobidskyi (Ukrainian: Слобідський район); namesake: Sloboda Ukraine (formerly Kominternіvskyi; namesake: Communist International)
8. Osnovianskyi (Ukrainian: Основ'янський район); namesake: Osnova, a city neighborhood (formerly Chervonozavodskyi; lit. 'Red Factory')
9. Novobavarskyi (Ukrainian: Новобаварський район); namesake: Nova Bavariia, a city neighborhood (formerly Zhovtnevyi; namesake: October Revolution)

== Demographics ==
Historical population
Year	Pop.	±%
1660	1,000	—
1788	10,742	+974.2%
1850	41,861	+289.7%
1861	50,301	+20.2%
1901	198,273	+294.2%
1916	352,300	+77.7%
1917	382,000	+8.4%
1920	285,000	−25.4%
1926	417,000	+46.3%
1939	833,000	+99.8%
1941	902,312	+8.3%
1941	1,400,000	+55.2%
1941	456,639	−67.4%
1943	170,000	−62.8%
1959	930,000	+447.1%
1962	1,000,000	+7.5%
1976	1,384,000	+38.4%
1982	1,500,000	+8.4%
1989	1,609,959	+7.3%
2001	1,470,902	−8.6%
2011	1,446,500	−1.7%
January 2022	1,421,125	−1.8%
March 2022	400,000	−71.9%
June 2022	750,000	+87.5%
November 2022	1,100,000	+46.7%

According to the 1989 Soviet Union Census, the population of the city was 1,593,970. In 1991, it decreased to 1,510,200, including 1,494,200 permanent residents. The population in 2023 was 1,430,885. Kharkiv is the second-largest city in Ukraine after the capital, Kyiv. The first independent all-Ukrainian population census was conducted in December 2001, and the next all-Ukrainian population census is decreed to be conducted after the end of the ongoing Russo-Ukrainian war. As of 2001, the population of Kharkiv Oblast is as follows: 78.5% living in urban areas, and 21.5% living in rural areas.

=== Ethnicity ===
Ethnic group	1897	1926	1939	1959	1989	2001
Ukrainians	25.9%	38.6%	48.5%	48.4%	50.4%	62.8%
Russians	63.2%	37.2%	32.9%	40.4%	43.6%	33.2%
Jews	5.7%	19.5%	15.6%	8.7%	3.0%	0.7%

==== Notes ====
- 1660 year – approximated estimation
- 1788 year – without the account of children
- 1920 year – times of the Russian Civil War
- 1941 year – estimation on 1 May, right before German-Soviet War
- 1941 year – next estimation in September varies between 1,400,000 and 1,450,000
- 1941 year – another estimation in December during the occupation without the account of children
- 1943 year – 23 August, liberation of the city; estimation varied 170,000 and 220,000
- 1976 year – estimation on 1 June
- 1982 year – estimation in March

Kharkiv has a sizable Vietnamese community who dominate the local Barabashovo market (one of the largest markets in Europe). At the market most of these (Vietnamese) traders use a Ukrainianized version of their names.

=== Language ===
Distribution of the population of the city of Kharkiv by native language according to the 2001 census:

Language	Number	Percentage
Ukrainian	460,607	31.77%
Russian	954,901	65.86%
Other or undecided	34,363	2.37%
Total	1,449,871	100.00%

According to a survey conducted by the International Republican Institute in April–May 2023, 16% of the city's population spoke Ukrainian at home, and 78% spoke Russian.

== Religion ==
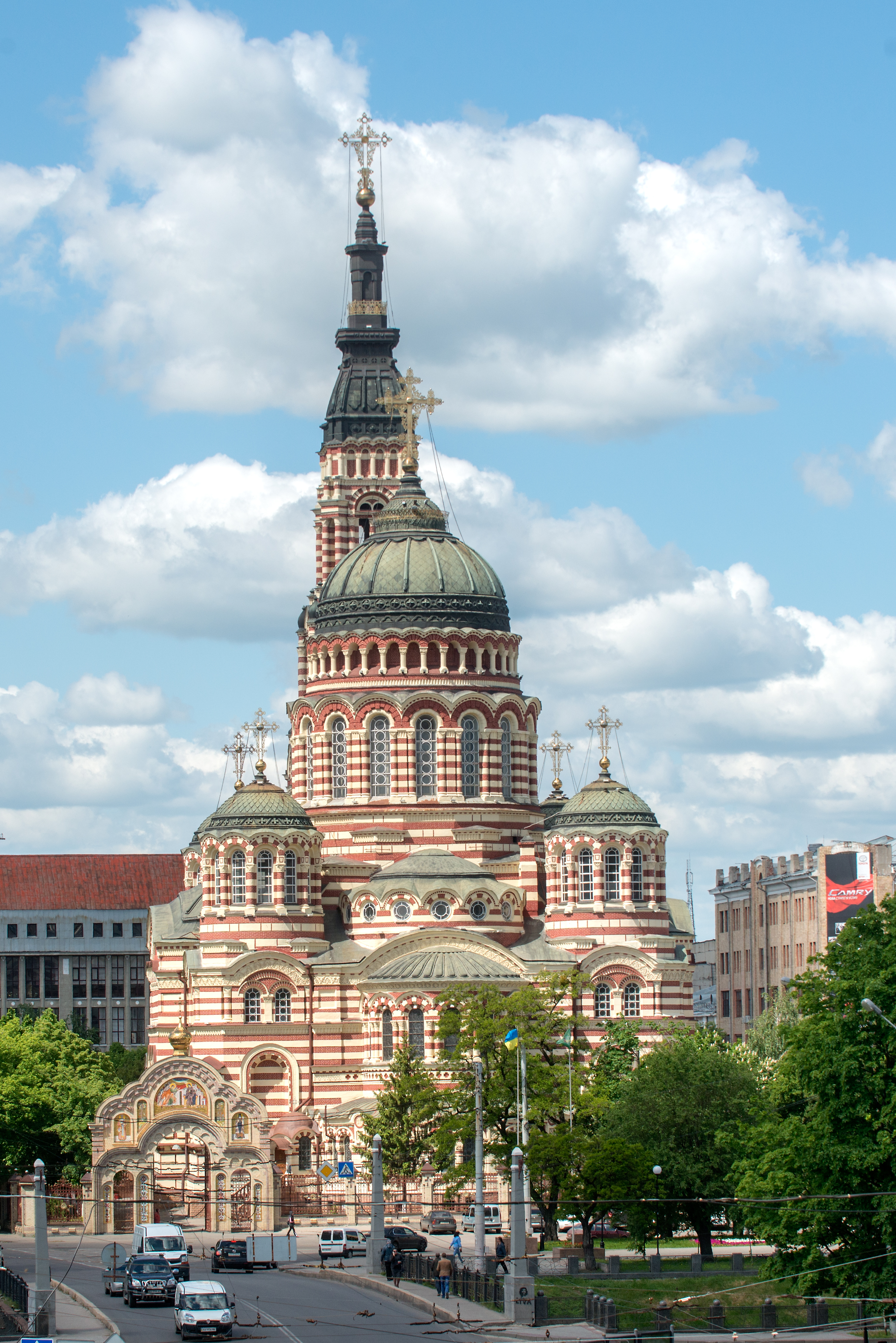
The Annunciation Orthodox Cathedral is one of the tallest Orthodox churches in the world. It was completed on 2 October 1888.

Kharkiv is an important religious center in Eastern Ukraine.

There are many old and new religious buildings, associated with various denominations in Kharkiv. Dormition Orthodox Cathedral was built in Kharkiv in the 1680s and rebuilt in the 1820s and 1830s. Holy Trinity Orthodox Church was built in Kharkiv in 1758–1764 and rebuilt in 1857–1861. Annunciation Orthodox Cathedral, one of the tallest Orthodox churches in the world, was completed in Kharkiv on 2 October 1888.

Recently built churches include St. Valentine's Orthodox Church and St. Tamara's Orthodox Church.

Kharkiv's Jewish population is estimated to be around 8,000 people. It is served by the old Kharkiv Choral Synagogue, which was fully renovated in Kharkiv in 1991–2016.

There are two mosques including the Kharkiv Cathedral Mosque and one Islamic center in Kharkiv.

== Economy ==
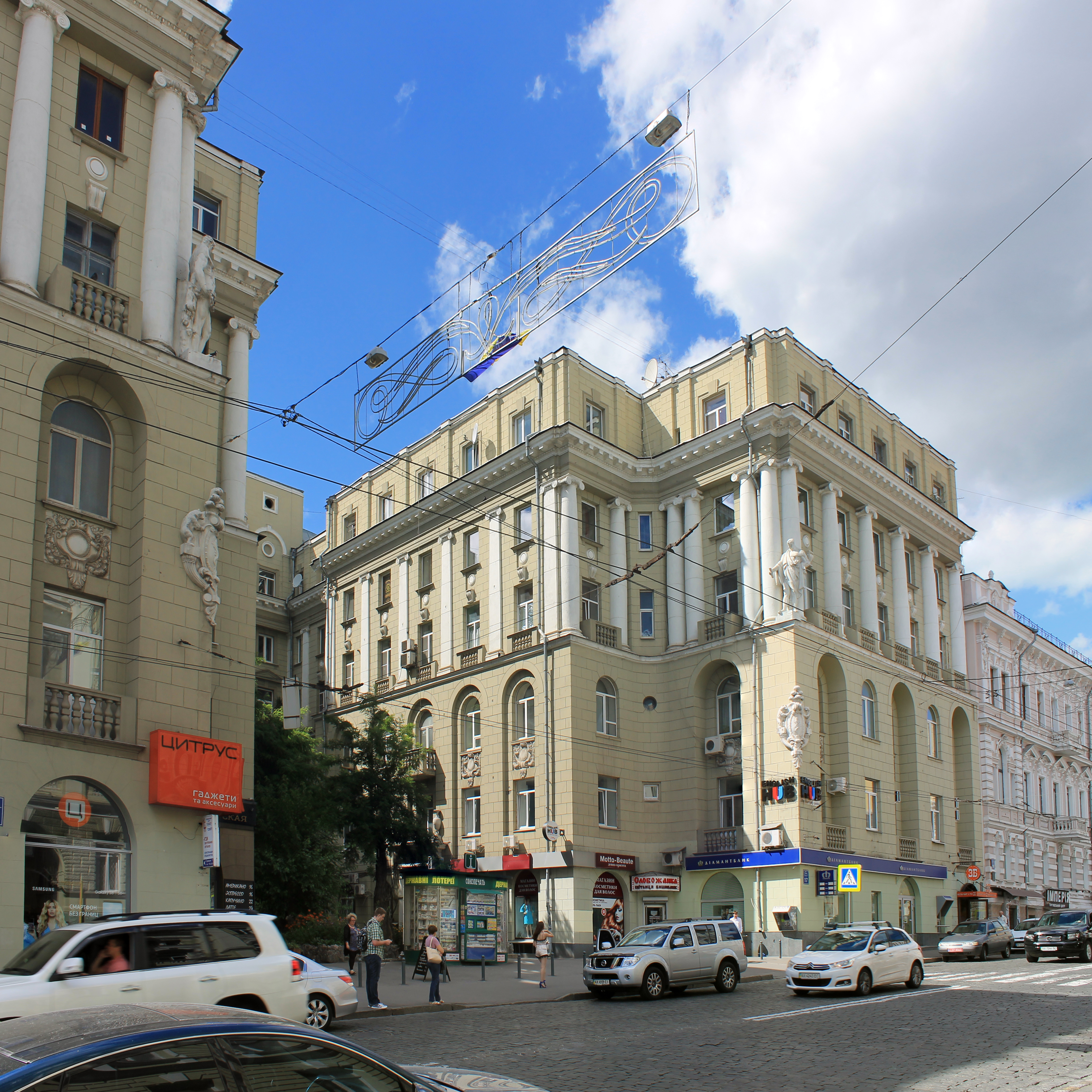
Sumska Street is the main thoroughfare of Kharkiv.

The 2016–2020 economic development strategy: "Kharkiv Success Strategy", is created in Kharkiv. Kharkiv has a diversified service economy, with employment spread across a wide range of professional services, including financial services, manufacturing, tourism, and high technology.

=== Industrial corporations ===
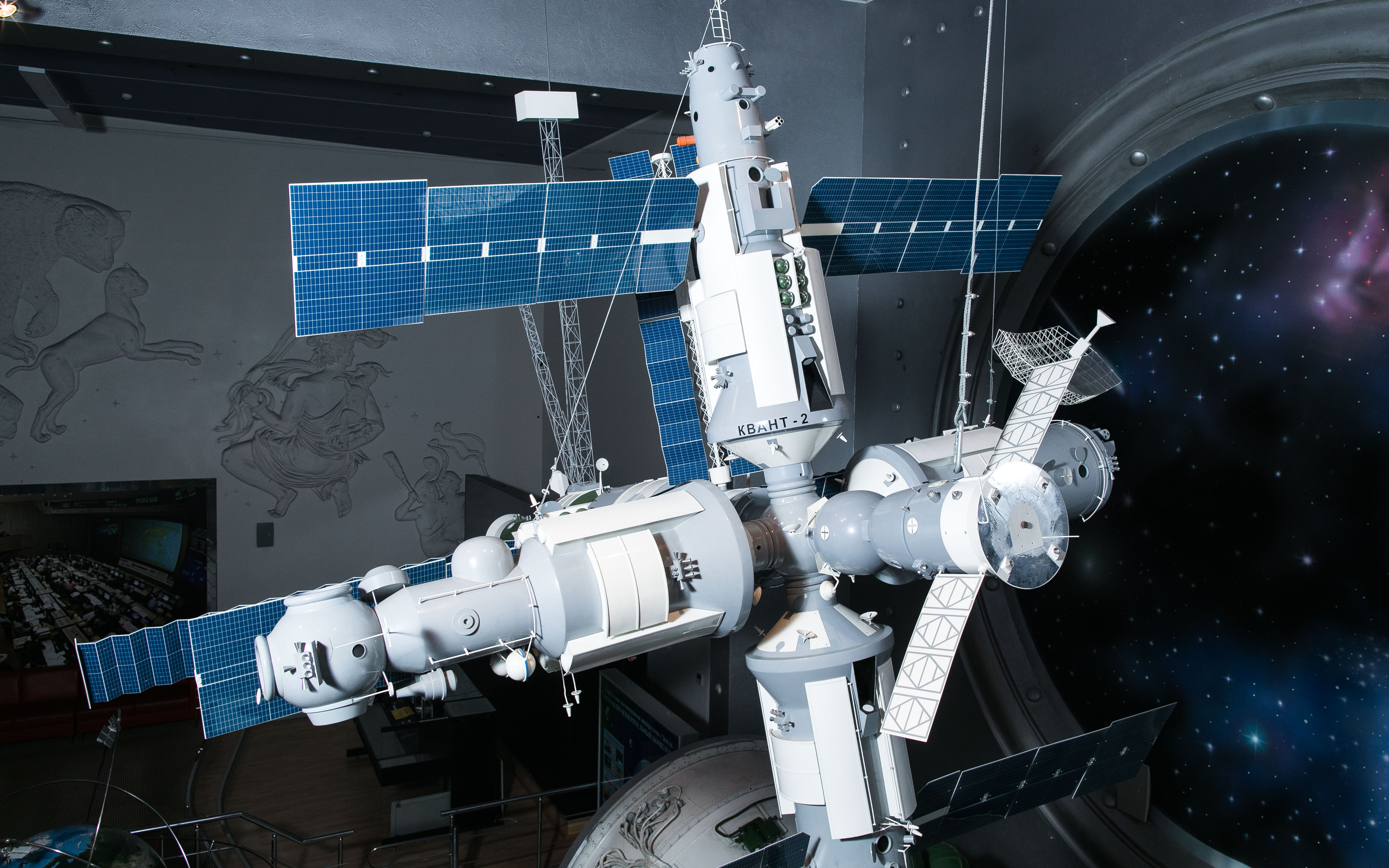
Kvant-2 module – its control system was designed at Khartron in Kharkiv.

During the Soviet era, Kharkiv was the capital of industrial production in Ukraine and a large center of industry and commerce in the USSR. After the collapse of the Soviet Union the largely defense-systems-oriented industrial production of the city decreased significantly. In the early 2000s, the industry started to recover and adapt to market economy needs. The enterprises comprise machine-building, electro-technology, instrument-making, and energy conglomerates.

State-owned industrial giants, such as Turboatom and Elektrovazhmash occupy 17% of the heavy power equipment construction (e.g., turbines) market worldwide. Multipurpose aircraft are produced by the Antonov aircraft manufacturing plant. The Malyshev factory produces not only armored fighting vehicles, but also harvesters. Khartron is the leading designer of space and commercial control systems in Ukraine and the former CIS.

=== IT industry ===
As of April 2018, there were 25,000 specialists in IT industry of the Kharkiv region, 76% of them were related to computer programming. Thus, Kharkiv accounted for 14% of all IT specialists in Ukraine, which made it the second largest IT location in the country, right after the capital Kyiv.

At the time, the number of active IT companies in the region was 445, five of them employing more than 601 people. Besides, there were 22 companies employing between 201 and 600 workers. More than half of IT companies located in the Kharkiv region fell into the "extra small" category with less than 20 persons engaged. The list was compiled with 43 medium (81–200 employees) and 105 small companies (21–80).

Due to the comparably narrow market for IT services in Ukraine, the majority of Kharkiv's companies are export oriented with more than 95% of total sales generated overseas in 2017. Overall, the estimated revenue of Kharkiv IT companies was expected to grow from $800 million in 2018 to $1.85 billion by 2025. The major markets are North America (65%) and Europe (25%).

=== Finance industry ===
Kharkiv is also the headquarters of one of the largest Ukrainian banks, UkrSibbank, which has been part of the BNP Paribas group since December 2005.

=== Trade industry ===
There are many large modern shopping malls in Kharkiv.

There is a large number of markets:

- Barabashovo market, the largest market in Ukraine and one of the largest in Europe
- Tsentralnyi market (Blahovishchenskyi market)
- Kinnyi (Horse) market
- Sumskyi market
- Raiskyi book market

== Science and education ==
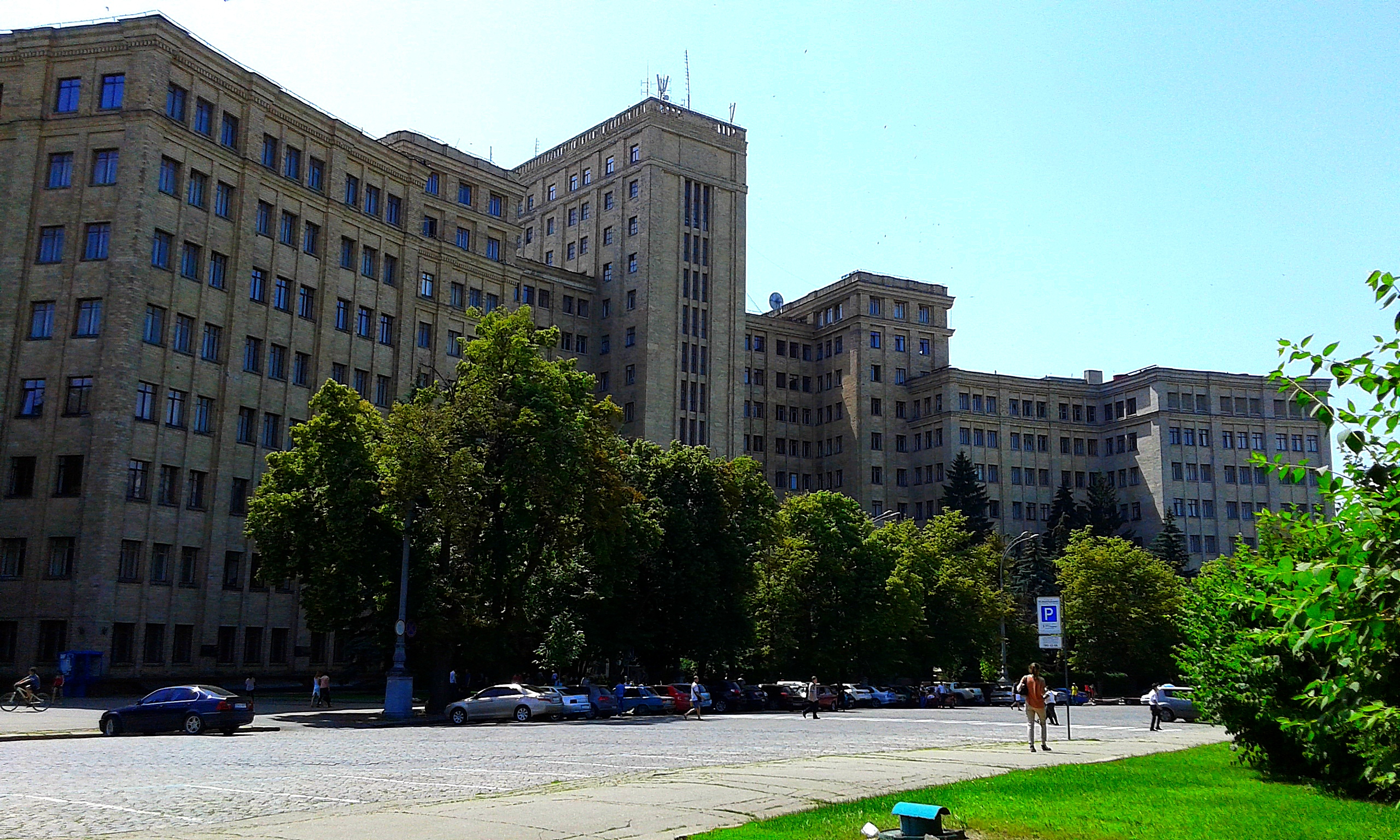
Main building of V. N. Karazin Kharkiv National University.

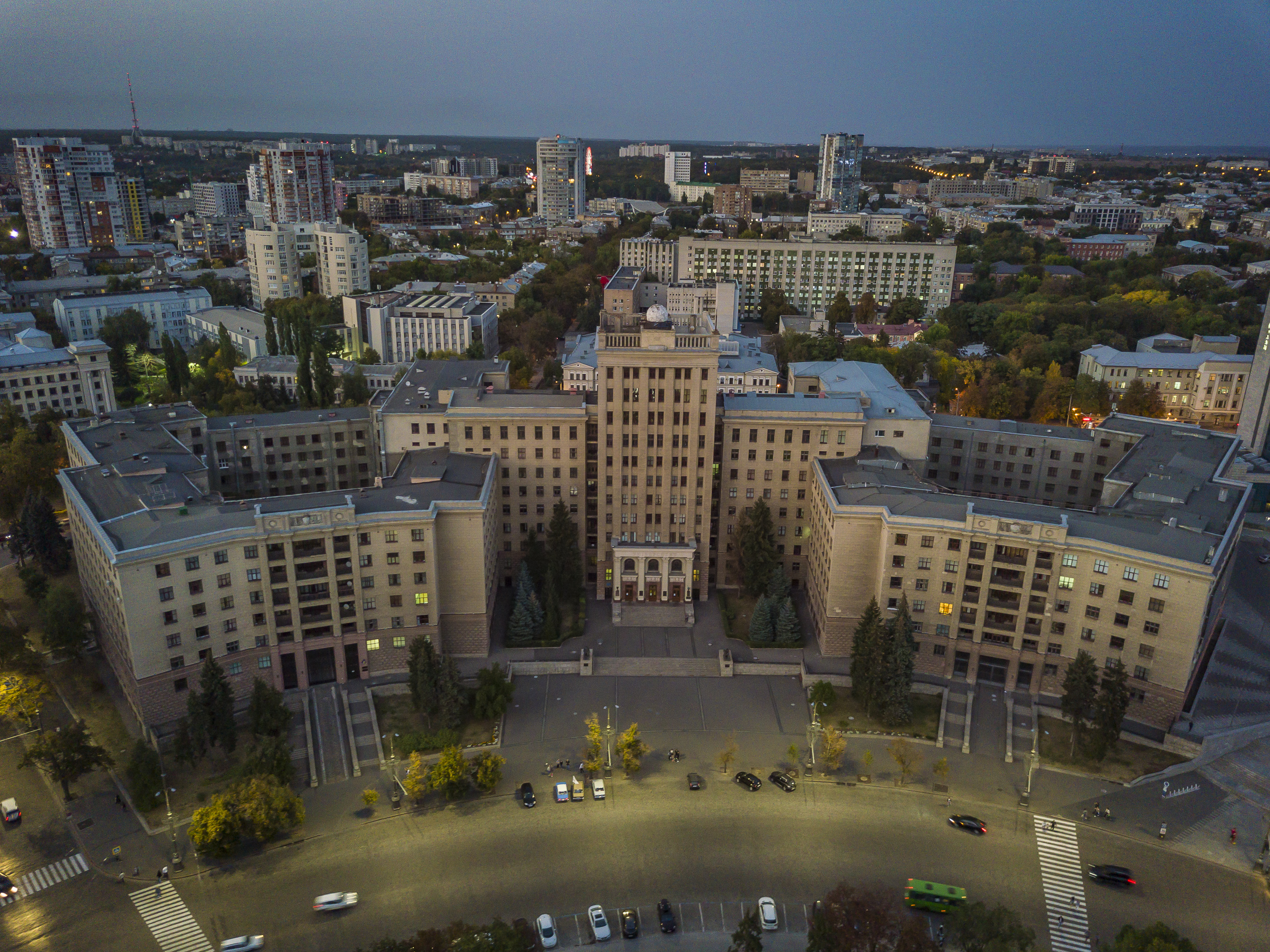
Northern building of V. N. Karazin Kharkiv National University.

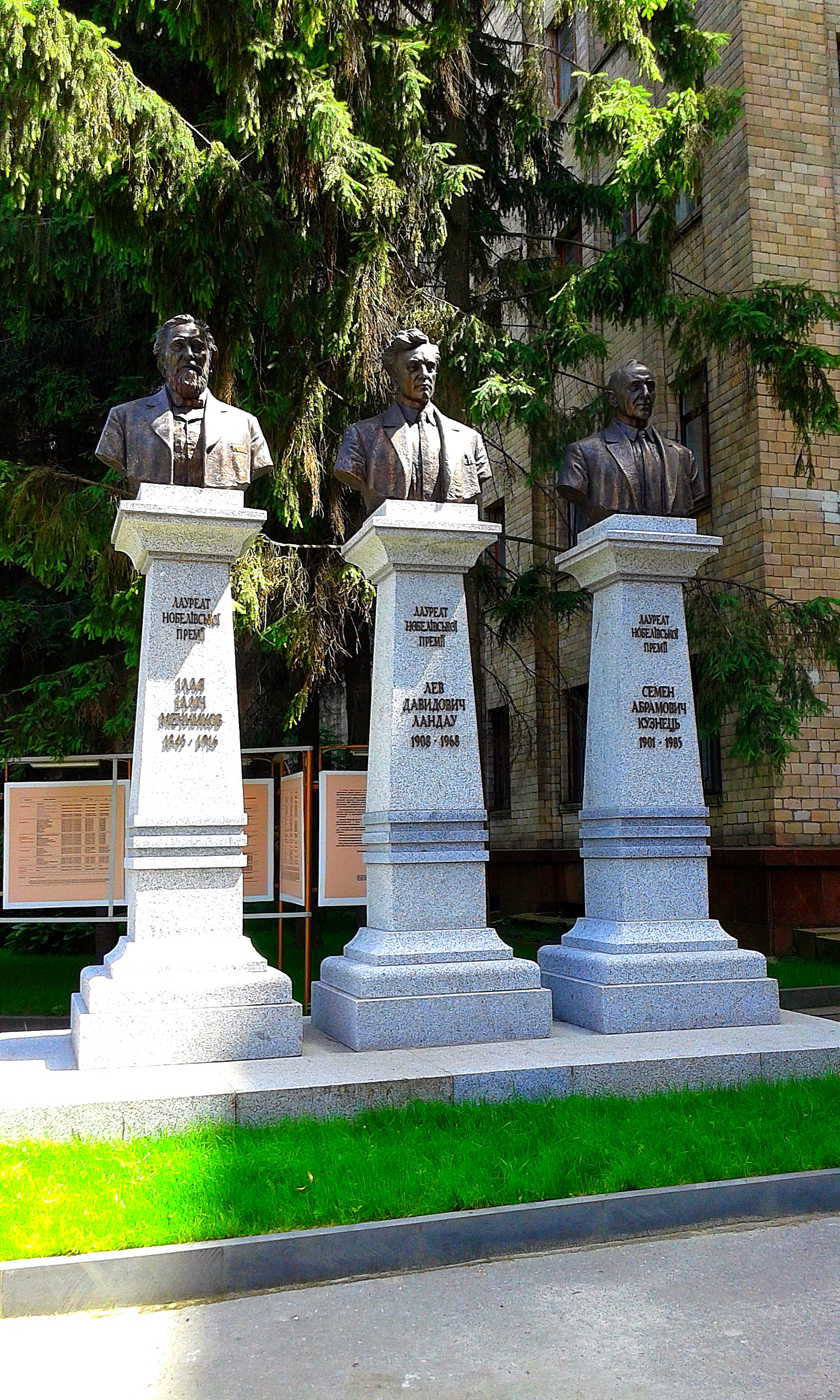
Il'ya I. Mechnikov, Lev D. Landau, Simon A. Kuznets Nobel Laureates Monuments at V. N. Karazin Kharkiv National University.

=== Higher education ===
The Vasyl N. Karazin Kharkiv National University is the most prestigious reputable classic university, which was founded due to the efforts by Vasily Karazin in Kharkiv in 1804–1805. On 29 January [O.S. 17 January] 1805, the Decree on the Opening of the Imperial University in Kharkiv came into force.

The Roentgen Institute opened in 1931. It was a specialist cancer treatment facility with 87 research workers, 20 professors, and specialist medical staff. The facilities included chemical, physiology, and bacteriology experimental treatment laboratories. It produced x-ray apparatus for the whole country.

The city has 13 national universities and numerous professional, technical and private higher education institutions, offering its students a wide range of disciplines. These universities include Kharkiv National University (12,000 students), National Technical University "KhPI" (20,000 students), Kharkiv National University of Radioelectronics (12,000 students), Yaroslav Mudryi National Law University, Kharkiv National Aerospace University "KhAI", Kharkiv National University of Economics, Kharkiv National University of Pharmacy, and Kharkiv National Medical University.

More than 17,000 faculty and research staff are employed in the institutions of higher education in Kharkiv.

=== Scientific research ===
The city has a high concentration of research institutions, which are independent or loosely connected with the universities. Among them are three national science centers: Kharkiv Institute of Physics and Technology, Institute of Meteorology, Institute for Experimental and Clinical Veterinary Medicine and 20 national research institutions of the National Academy of Science of Ukraine, such as the B Verkin Institute for Low Temperature Physics and Engineering, Institute for Problems of Cryobiology and Cryomedicine, State Scientific Institution "Institute for Single Crystals", Usikov Institute of Radiophysics and Electronics (IRE), Institute of Radio Astronomy (IRA), and others. A total number of 26,000 scientists are working in research and development.

A number of world-renowned scientific schools appeared in Kharkiv, such as the theoretical physics school and the mathematical school.

There is the Kharkiv Scientists House in the city, which was built by A. N. Beketov, architect in Kharkiv in 1900. All the scientists like to meet and discuss various scientific topics at the Kharkiv Scientists House in Kharkiv.

Since 1993, Kharkiv has been home to the National Academy of Legal Sciences of Ukraine (NALS), the country's only state branch academy of sciences located outside the capital city of Kyiv. As the highest state scientific institution in the field of state and law, the academy coordinates fundamental and applied legal research, provides scientific support for legal reforms, and drafts legislation, reinforcing Kharkiv's status as the nation's primary legal and jurisprudential hub.

=== Public libraries ===
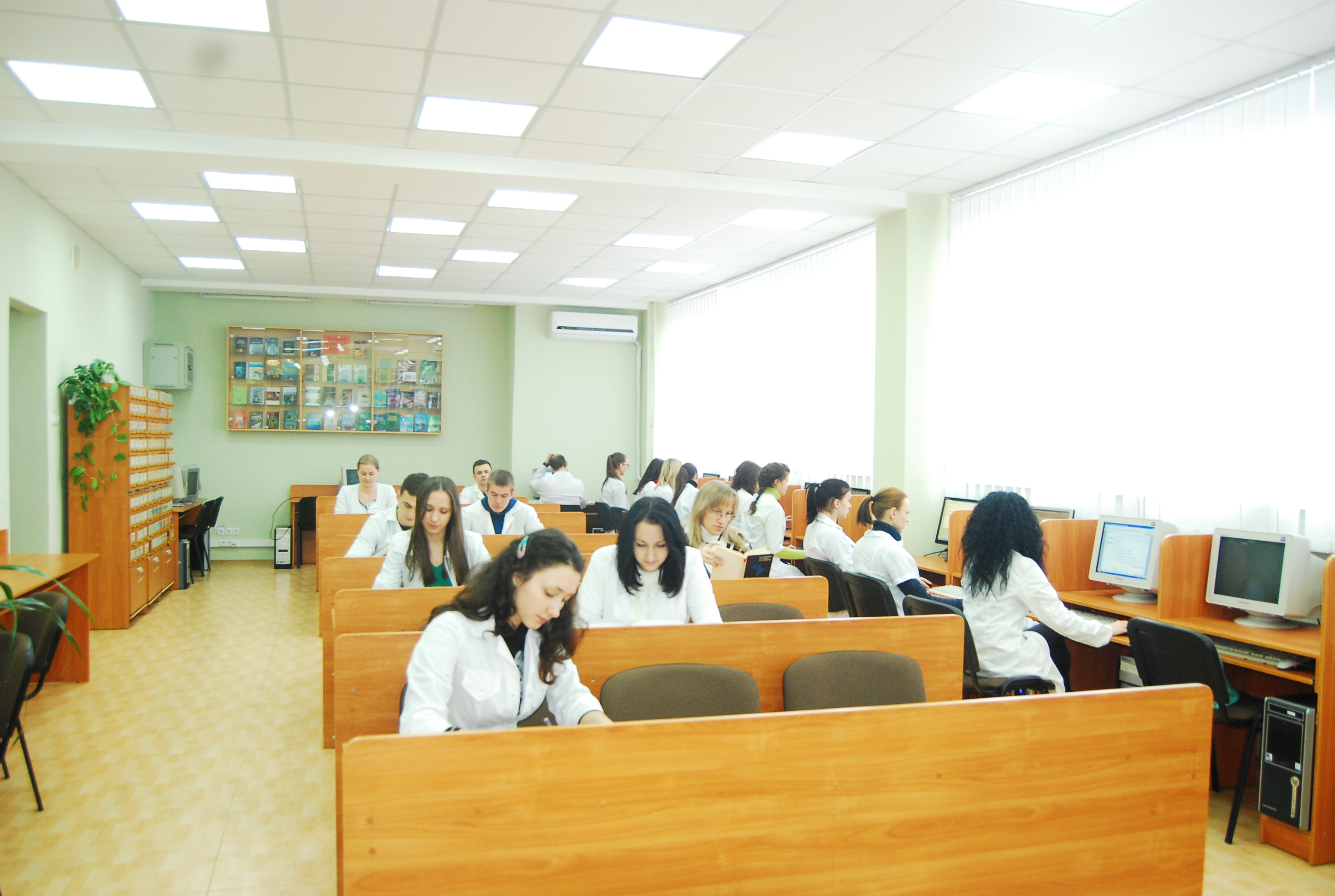
Students in the library of the National University of Pharmacy in Kharkiv

Kharkiv's largest libraries include the Kharkiv Korolenko State Scientific Library, the Central Scientific Library of Kharkiv University, the Kharkiv State Scientific Medical Library, and the library of the O. Ya. Usikov Institute of Radiophysics and Electronics of the National Academy of Sciences of Ukraine.

The city has also hosted major literary events, including the annual "Svit Knyhy" (Book World) festival and the "Zoryanyi Mist" (Star Bridge) international science fiction festival, which was held from 1999 to 2011.

=== Secondary schools ===
Kharkiv has 212 (secondary education) schools, including 10 lyceums and 20 gymnasiums. In May 2024 the first of a scatter of underground schools in Kharkiv was opened in Industrialnyi District, so children could continue their education amidst the missile strikes in Kharkiv by the Russian Armed Forces during the Russian invasion of Ukraine.

=== Education centers ===
There is the educational "Landau Center", which is named after L.D. Landau, Nobel laureate in Kharkiv.

== Culture ==
Kharkiv is one of the main cultural centers in Ukraine. It is home to 20 museums, over 10 theatres and a number of art galleries. Until 2022, large music and cinema festivals were hosted in Kharkiv almost every year.

=== Theatres ===
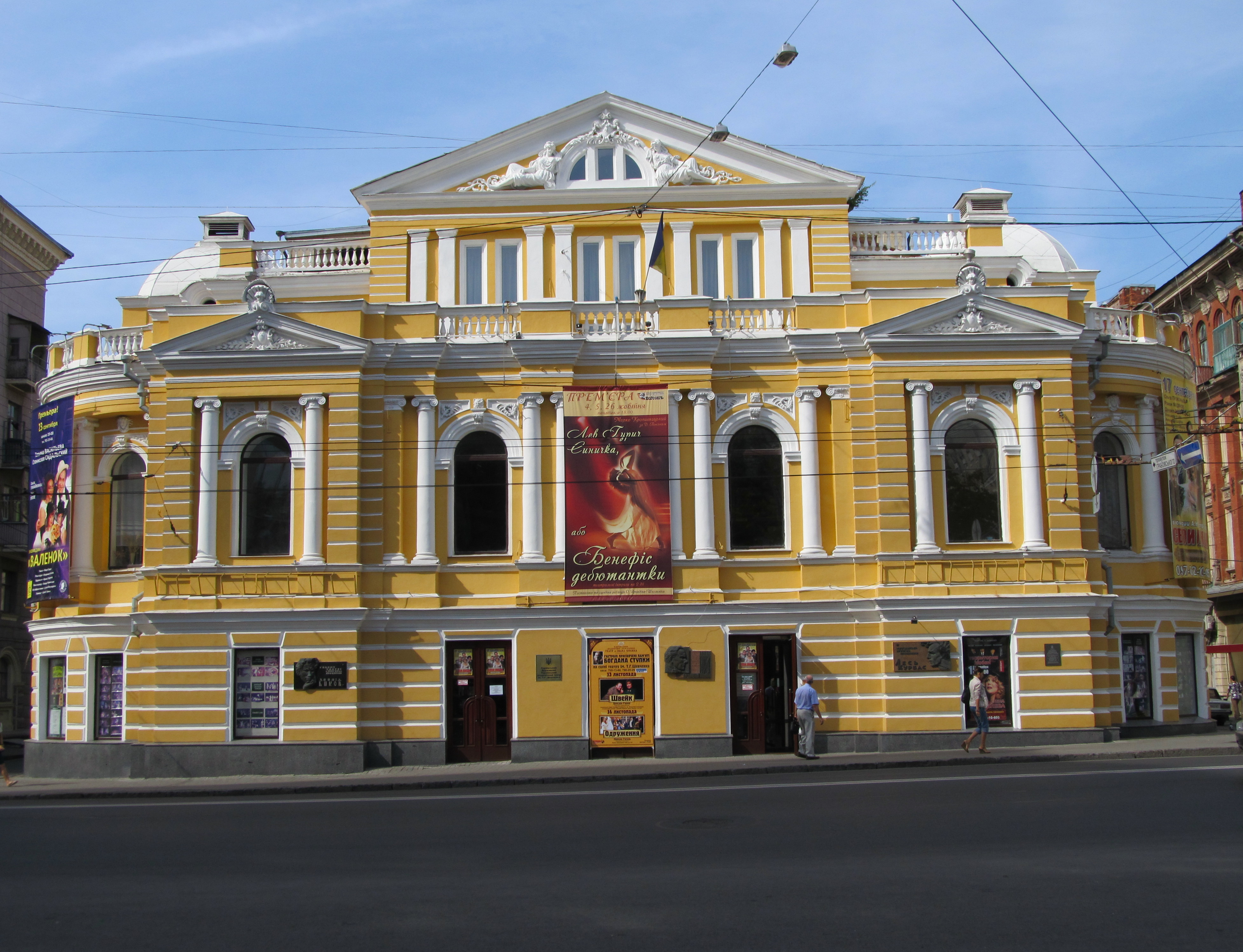
The Kharkiv Ukrainian Drama Theatre

The Kharkiv National Academic Opera and Ballet Theatre named after N. V. Lysenko is the biggest theatre in Kharkiv.

In 2017 the Kharkiv Ukrainian Drama Theatre named after T. G. Shevchenko was especially popular among theater audiences more prone to speak Ukrainian in daily life. Since the Russian invasion, the theatre has operated underground.

The Kharkiv Academic Drama Theatre was recently renovated, and it is quite popular among locals. Until October 2023 this theater was named after Russian poet Alexander Pushkin; the derussification of Ukraine campaign of that area led to its renaming that also meant the removal of (the word) "Russian" from the name.

The Kharkiv Theatre of the Young Spectator (now the Theatre for Children and Youth) is one of the oldest theatres for children.

The Kharkiv Puppet Theatre (The Kharkiv State Academic Puppet Theatre named after VA Afanasyev) is the first puppet theatre in the territory of Kharkiv. It was created in 1935.

The Kharkiv Academic Theatre of Musical Comedy is a theatre founded on 1 November 1929 in Kharkiv.

=== Literature ===
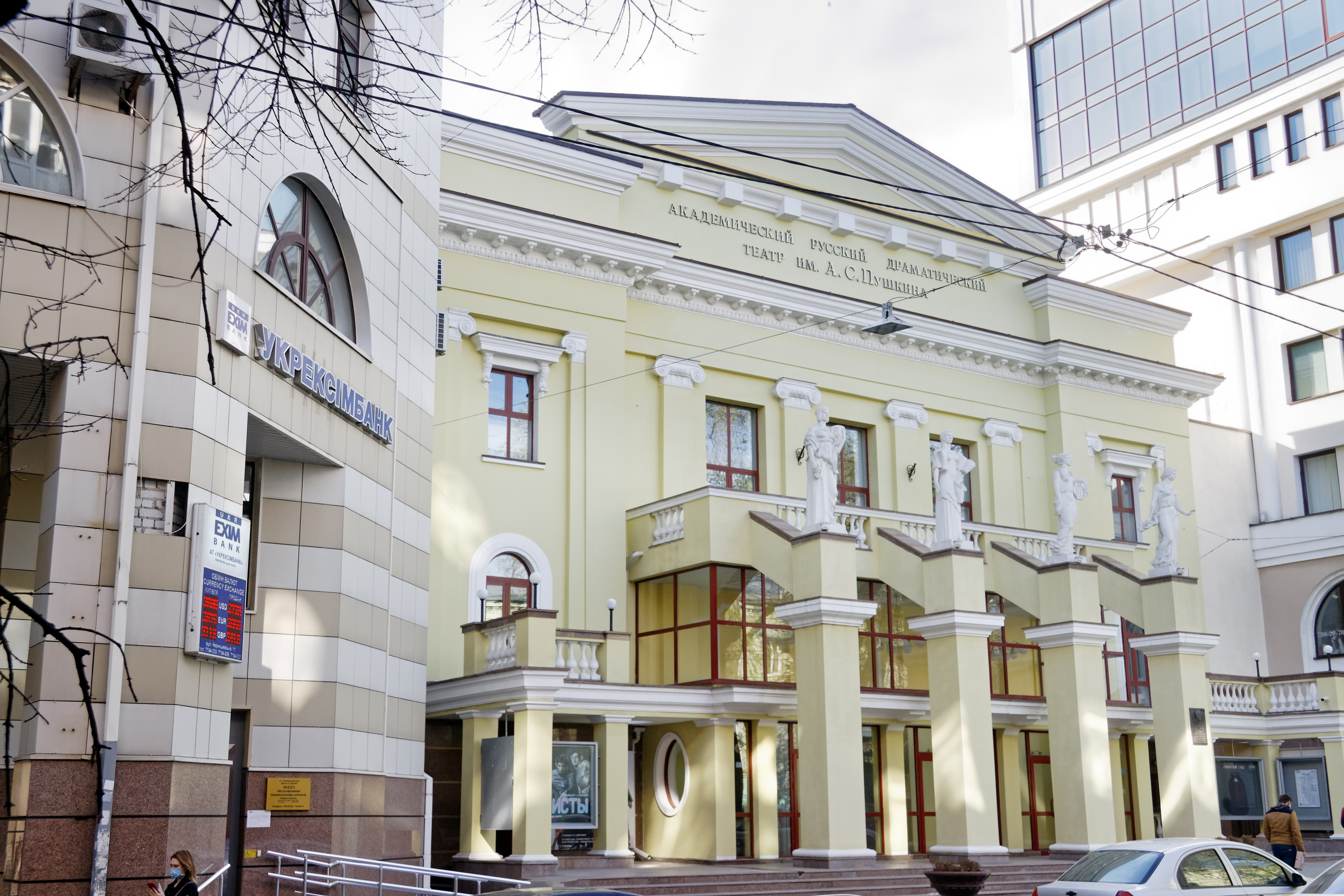
The Kharkiv Academic Drama Theatre

In the 1930s Kharkiv was referred to as a Literary Klondike. It was the center for the work of literary figures such as: Les Kurbas, Mykola Kulish, Mykola Khvylovy, Mykola Zerov, Valerian Pidmohylny, Pavlo Filipovych, Marko Voronny, Oleksa Slisarenko. Over 100 of these writers were repressed during the Stalinist purges of the 1930s. This tragic event in Ukrainian history is called the "Executed Renaissance" (Rozstrilene vidrodzhennia). Today, a literary museum located on Frunze Street marks their work and achievements.

Today, Kharkiv is often referred to as the "capital city" of Ukrainian science fiction and fantasy. It is home to a number of popular writers, such as H. L. Oldie, Alexander Zorich, Andrey Dashkov, Yuri Nikitin and Andrey Valentinov; most of them write in Russian and are popular in both Russia and Ukraine. The annual science fiction convention "Star Bridge" (Звёздный мост) has been held in Kharkiv since 1999.

Several notable writers are active in Kharkiv, including Serhiy Zhadan, Iryna Yevsa, and the science fiction and fantasy authors Andriy Valentynov and Henry Lion Oldie (the joint pseudonym of Dmytro Hromov and Oleh Ladyzhensky). The city also serves as the setting for several novels.

The Kharkiv orthography of the Ukrainian language was adopted in 1927 during the All-Ukrainian Orthographic Conference held in the city. It was subsequently approved by the Ukrainian Academy of Sciences on 31 March 1929, and by the Shevchenko Scientific Society in Lviv on 29 May 1929.

Today, this orthography is still widely used by the Ukrainian diaspora in many of its publications, most notably in Svoboda, the oldest continuously published Ukrainian-language newspaper. It is also utilized by certain contemporary Ukrainian writers, literary editors, and linguists.

=== Music ===
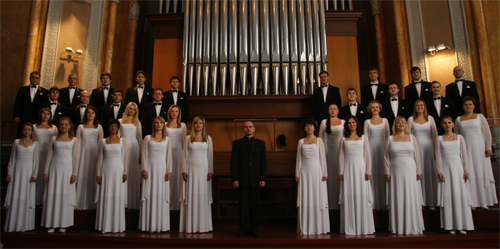
Academic choir of Kharkiv Philharmonic named after V. Palkin and chief leader of choir, prize winner of the all-Ukrainian choir masters contest, Andriy Syrotenko.

There is the Kharkiv Philharmonic Society in the city. The leading group active in the Philharmonic has been the Academic Symphony Orchestra. It had 100 musicians of a high professional level, many of whom are prize-winners in international and national competitions.

There is the Organ Music Hall in the city. The Organ Music Hall is situated at the Dormition Cathedral presently. The Rieger–Kloss organ was installed in the building of the Organ Music Hall back in 1986. The new Organ Music Hall will be opened at the extensively renovated building of Kharkiv Philharmonic Society in Kharkiv in November 2016.

The Kharkiv Conservatory and the Kharkiv National University of Arts named after I.P. Kotlyarevsky have been the major music schools.

Kharkiv hosted the prestigious, tri-annual Hnat Khotkevych International Music Competition of Performers of Ukrainian Folk Instruments, and the "Kharkiv – City of Kind Hopes" festival.

Kharkiv is home to numerous influential black metal bands such as Nokturnal Mortum, Drudkh, and Hate Forest. In 2024, Drudkh's former drummer Mykola Sostin, was killed fighting for Ukraine in the war.

=== Films ===
Kharkiv played a significant role in the early development of cinematography. Joseph Timchenko, a native of the Kharkiv Governorate and a mechanic at Kharkiv University, designed an early moving-picture camera before the Lumière brothers. His apparatus was demonstrated on 9 January 1894 at the congress of Russian naturalists in Moscow.

The first motion pictures produced within the Russian Empire by one of its citizens were filmed in Kharkiv by the prominent local photographer Alfred Fedetsky. His debut film, The Solemn Transfer of the Miraculous Ozeryanka Icon from the Kuryazh Monastery to Kharkiv, was shot on Ekaterinoslavskaya Street (now Poltavskyi Shlyakh) on 30 September 1896. Fedetsky also directed the empire's second and third films later that year: Trick Riding by Cossacks of the First Orenburg Regiment at the Kharkiv racetrack on 15 October, and Inspection of the Kharkiv Railway Station at the Moment of Departure of a Train with Officials on the Platform around 4 November.

Between 1896 and 2002, more than one thousand documentary chronicles and short newsreels were filmed in Kharkiv.

Additionally, at least 86 feature films were shot in the city and the surrounding Kharkiv Oblast between 1907 and 2008. Notable examples include:

- Fragment of an Empire (1929) – The protagonist arrives in Leningrad and sees the Derzhprom (State Industry Building) in Kharkiv, used as a symbol of the new Soviet era.
- Bezhin Meadow (1937) – Directed by Sergei Eisenstein; partially filmed in Kharkiv and the nearby village of Ruska Lozova.
- Shchors (1939) – Directed by Oleksandr Dovzhenko; filmed in the village of Yeresky.
- To the Black Sea (1957) – Features scenes filmed on Freedom Square and near the Taras Shevchenko monument.
- Dmytro Horytsvit (1961)
- The Toreros of Vasyukivka (1965) – Directed by Samariy Zelikin, who lived and worked in Kharkiv for nearly two decades; won prizes at several international film festivals.
- The Adjutant of His Excellency (1969)
- Do You Know How to Live? (1970)
- Petka in Space (1972)
- The Old Fortress (1973–1976)
- The Polar Bear Skin (1979)
- How Young We Were (1985)
- A Lonely Woman Wishes to Meet Someone (1986)
- The Garden of Gethsemane (1993)
- Storm Over Rus (1992) – Starring Oleg Borisov.
- Clan M (2002)
- Russkoe (2004) – Starring Andrey Chadov, Galina Polskikh, and Dmitry Dyuzhev; a biographical film about the youth of writer Eduard Limonov.
- Farewell (2009) – A French film directed by Christian Carion, starring Emir Kusturica and Guillaume Canet. Filmed in 2008, the Govorov Military Academy portrayed the General Staff Academy in Moscow, while the Derzhprom metro station stood in for the Belyayevo station of the Moscow Metro.
- Dau (2008–2011) – A massive, immersive international project filmed on a specially constructed set in Kharkiv.
- Bablo (2011)
- The Match (2012) – Filmed in Kharkiv in 2011.

=== Film festivals ===
The Kharkiv Lilacs (Ukrainian: Kharkivska Buzok) international film festival is very popular among movie stars, makers and producers in Ukraine, Eastern Europe, Western Europe and North America. The festival was named after a book by French actress Mylène Demongeot, whose mother was born in Kharkiv. At the inaugural festival in 2009, the main prize was awarded to the documentary The English Surgeon, directed by Geoffrey Smith.

The annual festival is usually conducted in May.

There is a special alley with metal hand prints by popular movies actors at Shevchenko Garden in Kharkiv.

=== Visual arts ===
Kharkiv has been a home for many famous painters, including Ilya Repin, Zinaida Serebryakova, Henryk Siemiradzki, and Vasyl Yermilov. There are many modern arts galleries in the city: the Yermilov Centre, Lilacs Gallery, the Kharkiv Art Museum, the Kharkiv Municipal Gallery, the AC Gallery, Palladium Gallery, the Semiradsky Gallery, AVEK Gallery, and Arts of Slobozhanshyna Gallery among others.

=== Museums ===
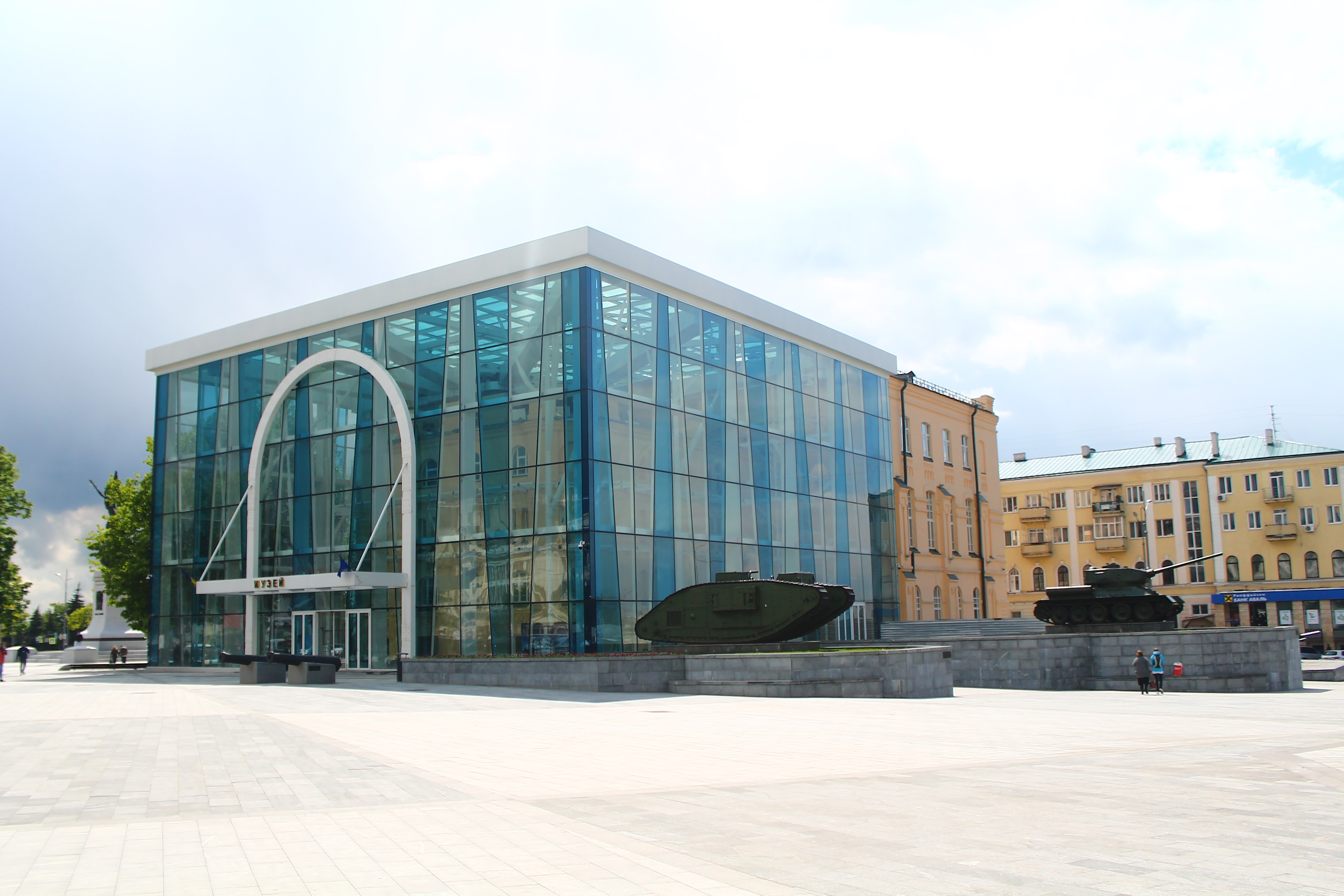
M. F. Sumtsov Kharkiv Historical Museum

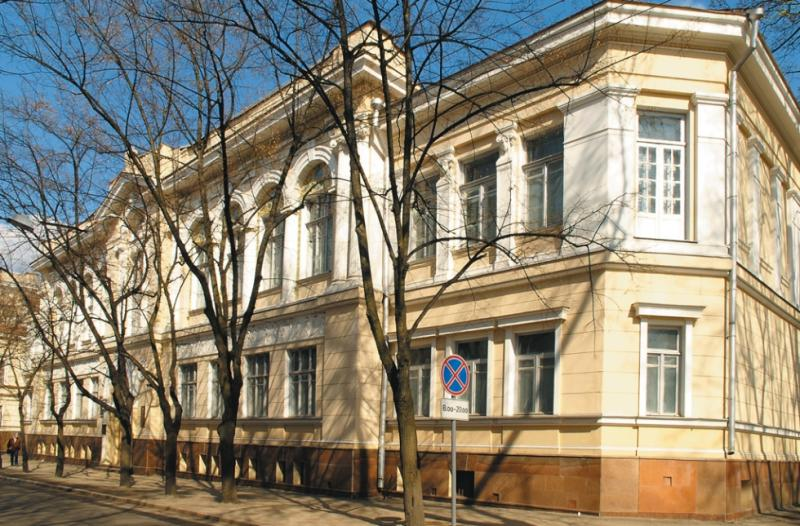
Kharkiv Art Museum

There are around 147 museums in the Kharkiv's region. Museums in the city include:

- The M. F. Sumtsov Kharkiv Historical Museum
- The Kharkiv Art Museum
- The Natural History Museum at V. N. Karazin Kharkiv National University was founded in Kharkiv on 2 April 1807. The museum is visited by 40000 visitors every year.
- The V. N. Karazin Kharkiv National University History Museum was established in Kharkiv in 1972.
- The V. N. Karazin Kharkiv National University Archeology Museum was founded in Kharkiv on 20 March 1998.
- The National Technical University "Kharkiv Polytechnical Institute" Museum was created in Kharkiv on 29 December 1972.
- The National Aerospace University "Kharkiv Aviation Institute" Museum was founded on 29 May 1992.
- The "National University of Pharmacy" Museum was founded in Kharkiv on 15 September 2010.
- The Kharkiv Maritime Museum – a museum dedicated to the history of shipbuilding and navigation.
- The Kharkiv Puppet Museum is the oldest museum of dolls in Ukraine.
- Memorial museum-apartment of the family Grizodubov.
- Club-Museum of Claudia Shulzhenko.
- The Museum of "First Aid".
- The Museum of Urban Transport.
- The Museum of Sexual Cultures.

=== Landmarks ===
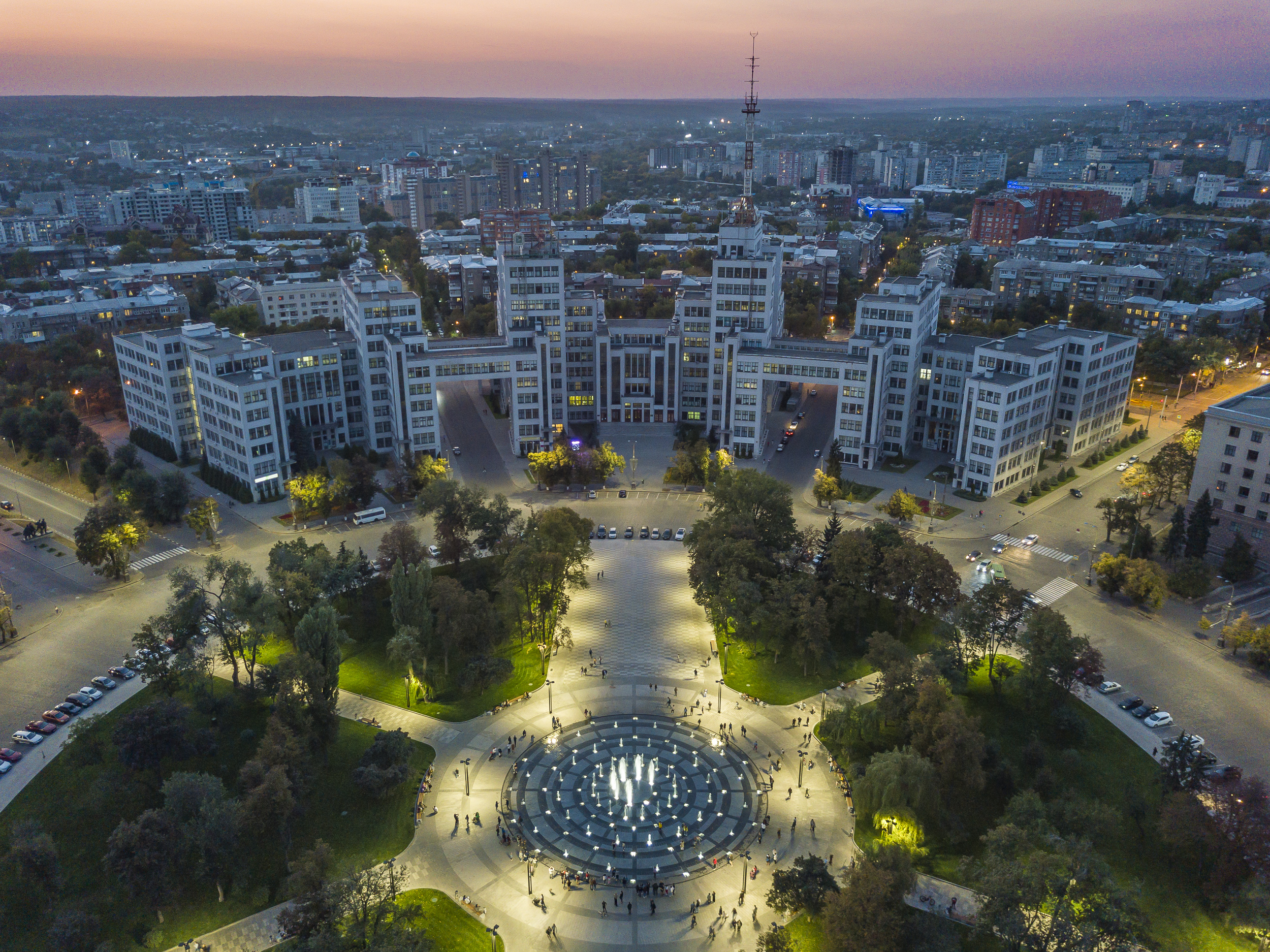
Derzhprom

The city is famous for its churches as well as Art Nouveau and constructivist architecture:

- Dormition Cathedral, built in 17th century in Baroque style and rebuilt in 18th and 19th centuries
- Intercession Cathedral, built in 18th century in Baroque style
- Annunciation Cathedral, built in 1887–1901 in Neo-Byzantine style
- Kharkiv Ukrainian Drama Theatre, built in 1841
- Kharkiv Puppet Theatre, former Volga-Kama Commercial Bank, built in 1907 in Art Nouveau style
- Kharkiv State Academy of Design and Arts, built in 1912 in Art Nouveau style
- Choral Synagogue, built in 1909–1913
- Central Market Hall, built 1912–1914
- Derzhprom building, built in 1925–1928 in constructivist style
- Freedom Square
- Railway Pochtamt (post office), built 1927–29 in constructivist style
- Palace of Culture of Railway Workers, built 1928–31 in constructivist style
- Kharkiv railway station, rebuilt in socialist-realist style in 1952
- Kharkiv Opera, built in 1970–1990 in brutalist style

Other attractions include: Taras Shevchenko Monument, Mirror Stream, Historical Museum, T. Shevchenko Gardens, Kharkiv Zoo, Children's narrow-gauge railroad, World War I Tank Mk V, Memorial Complex, and many more.

After the 2014 Russian annexation of Crimea the monument to Petro Konashevych-Sahaidachny in Sevastopol was removed and handed over to Kharkiv.

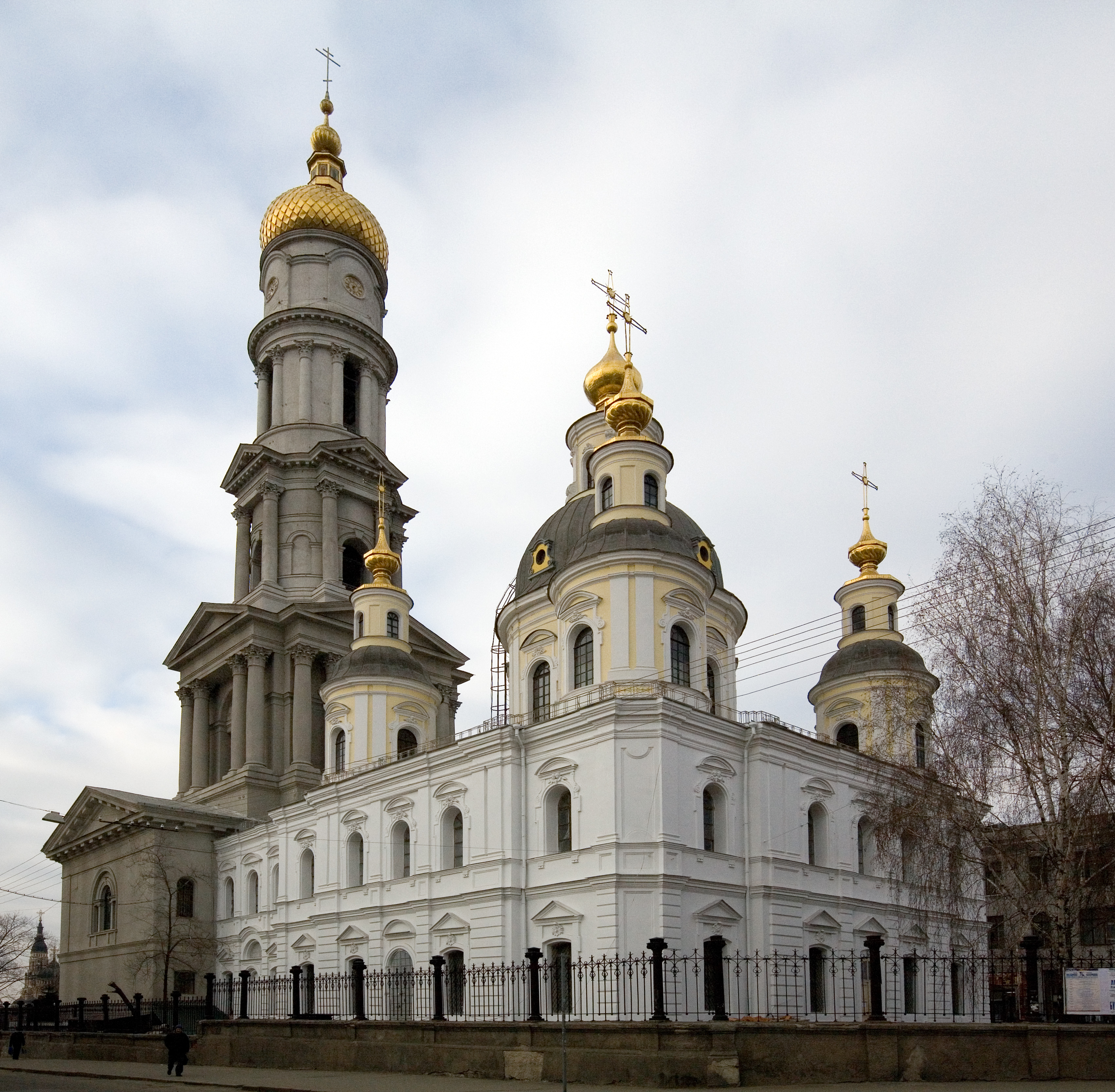
Dormition Cathedral

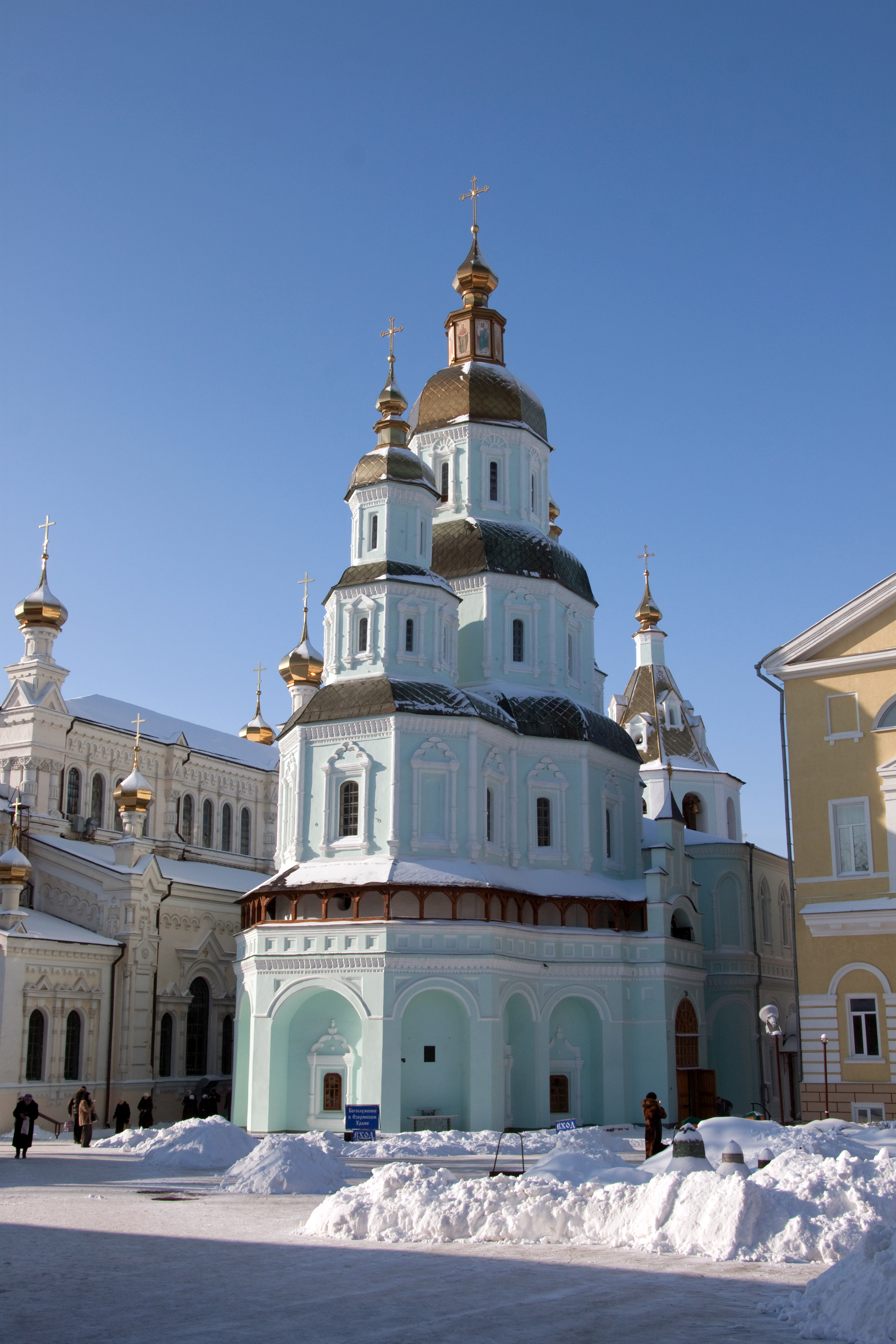
Intercession Cathedral

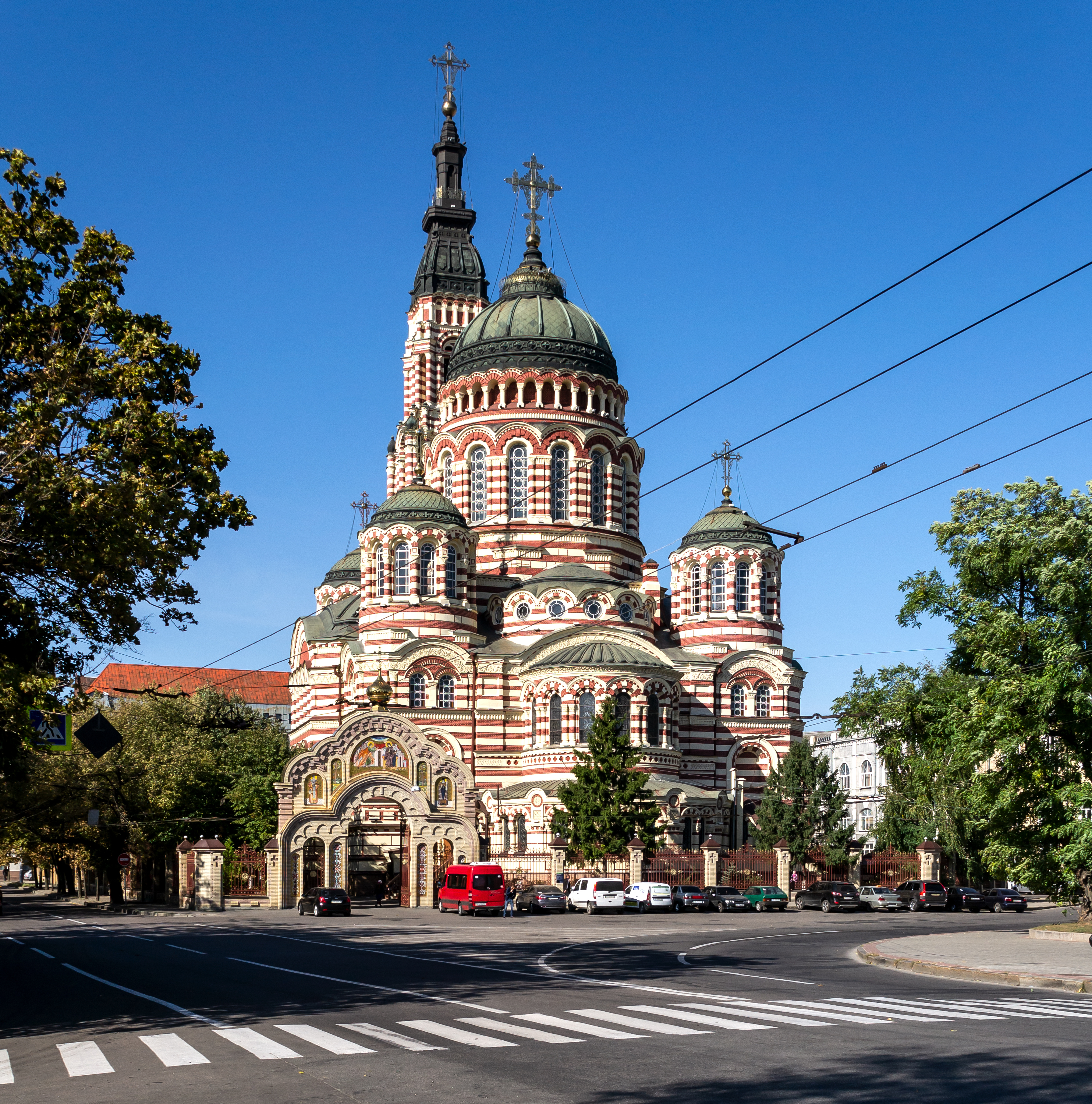
Annunciation Cathedral

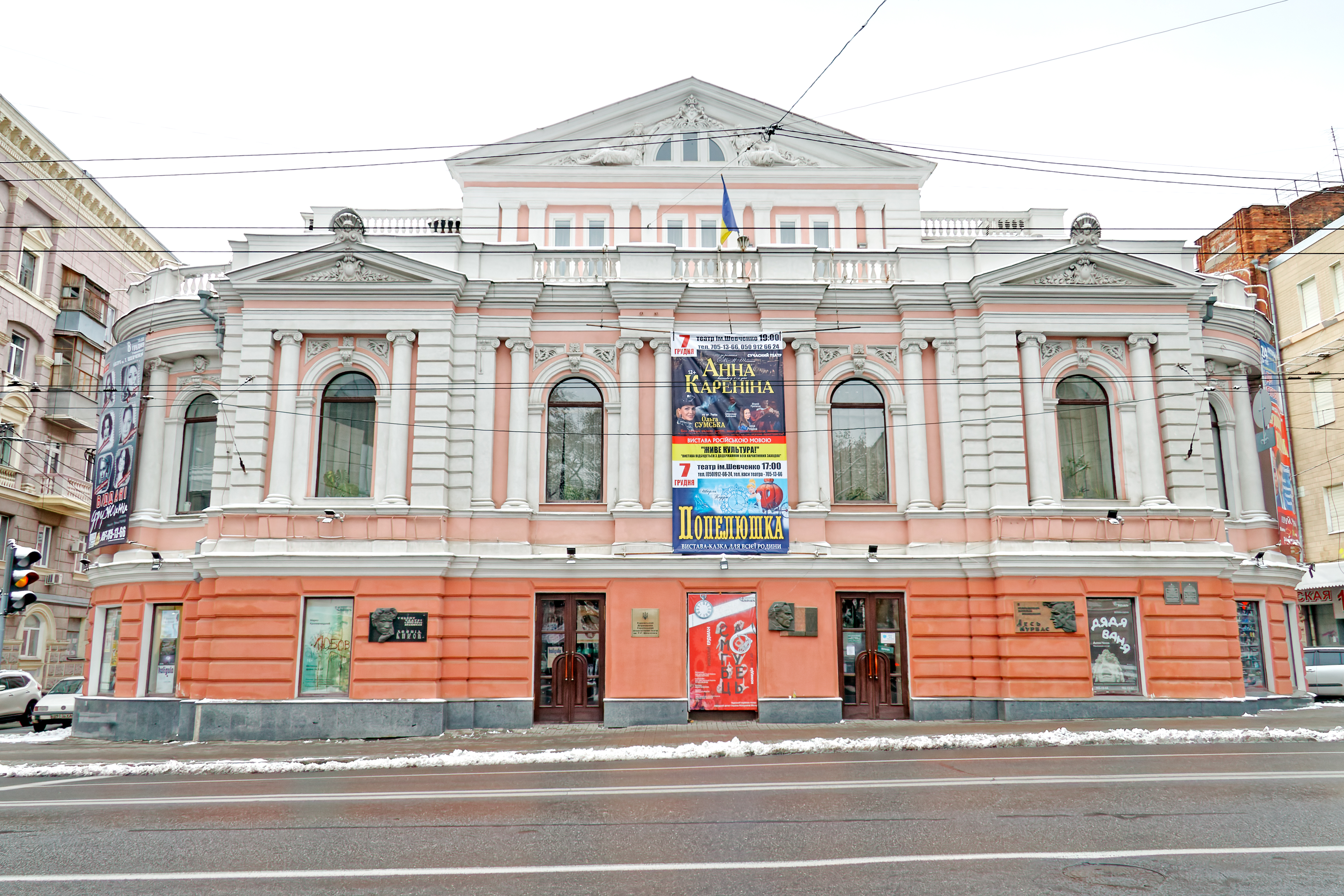
Kharkiv Ukrainian Drama Theatre

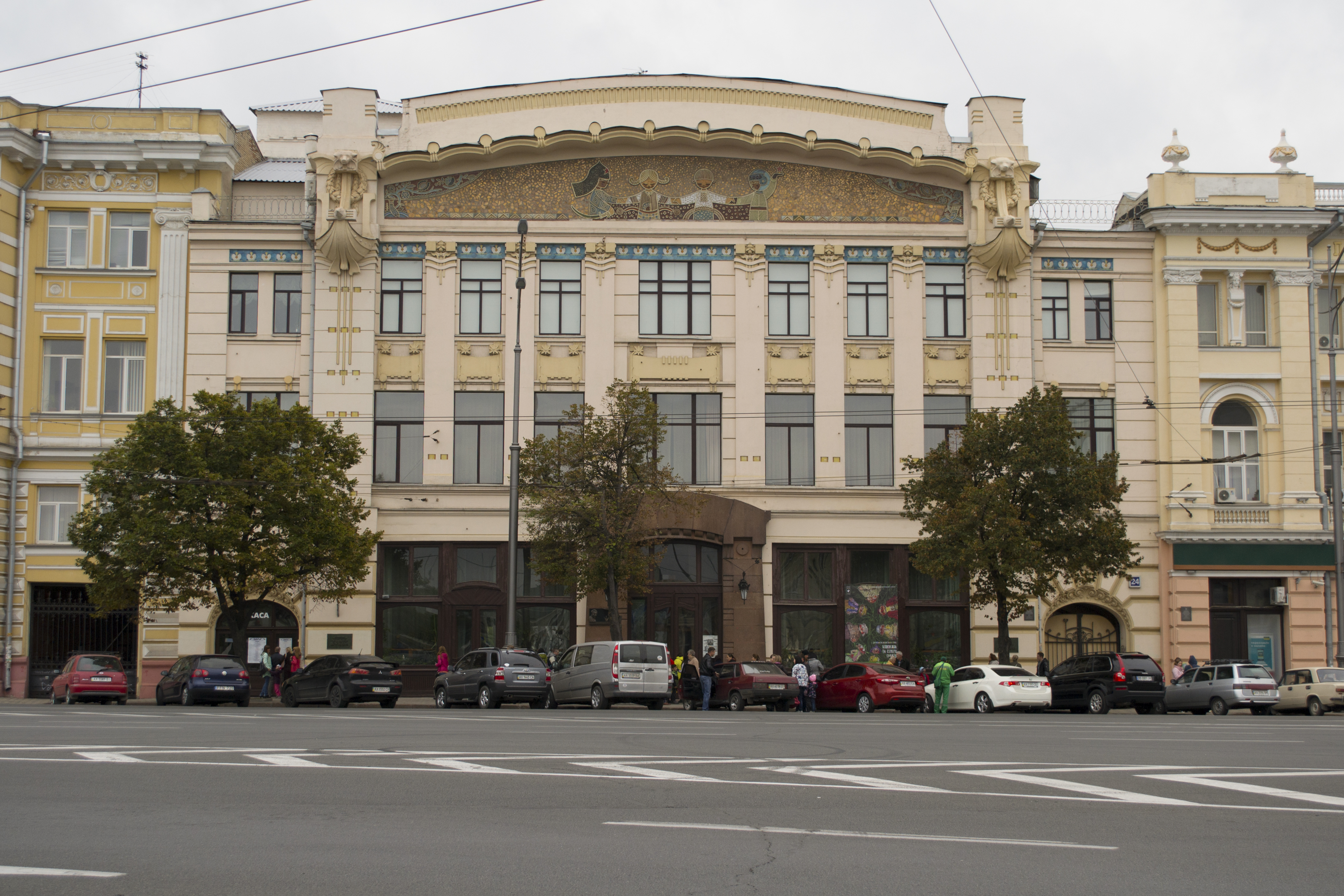
Kharkiv Puppet Theatre (former Volga-Kama Bank)

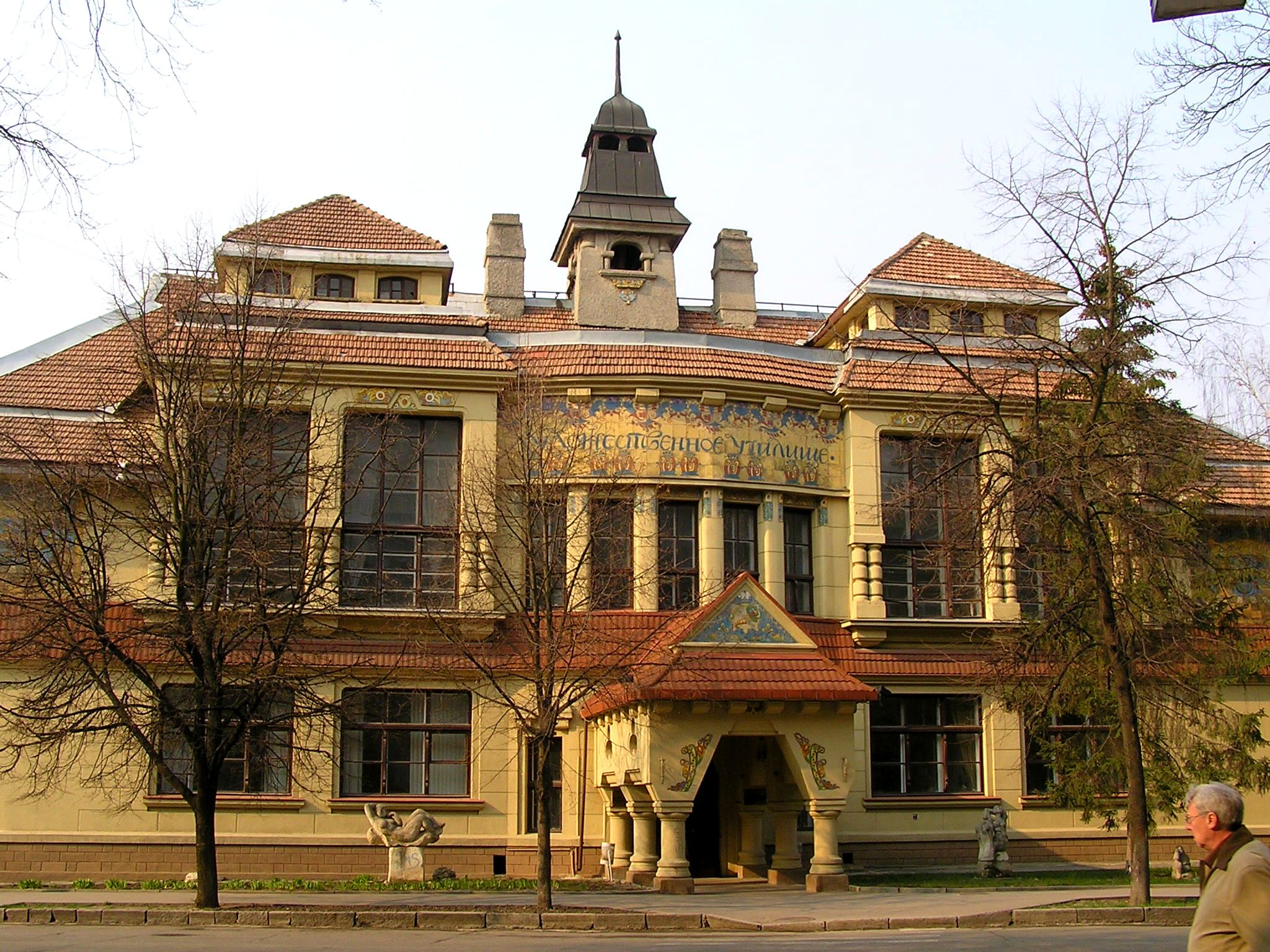
Kharkiv State Academy of Design and Arts

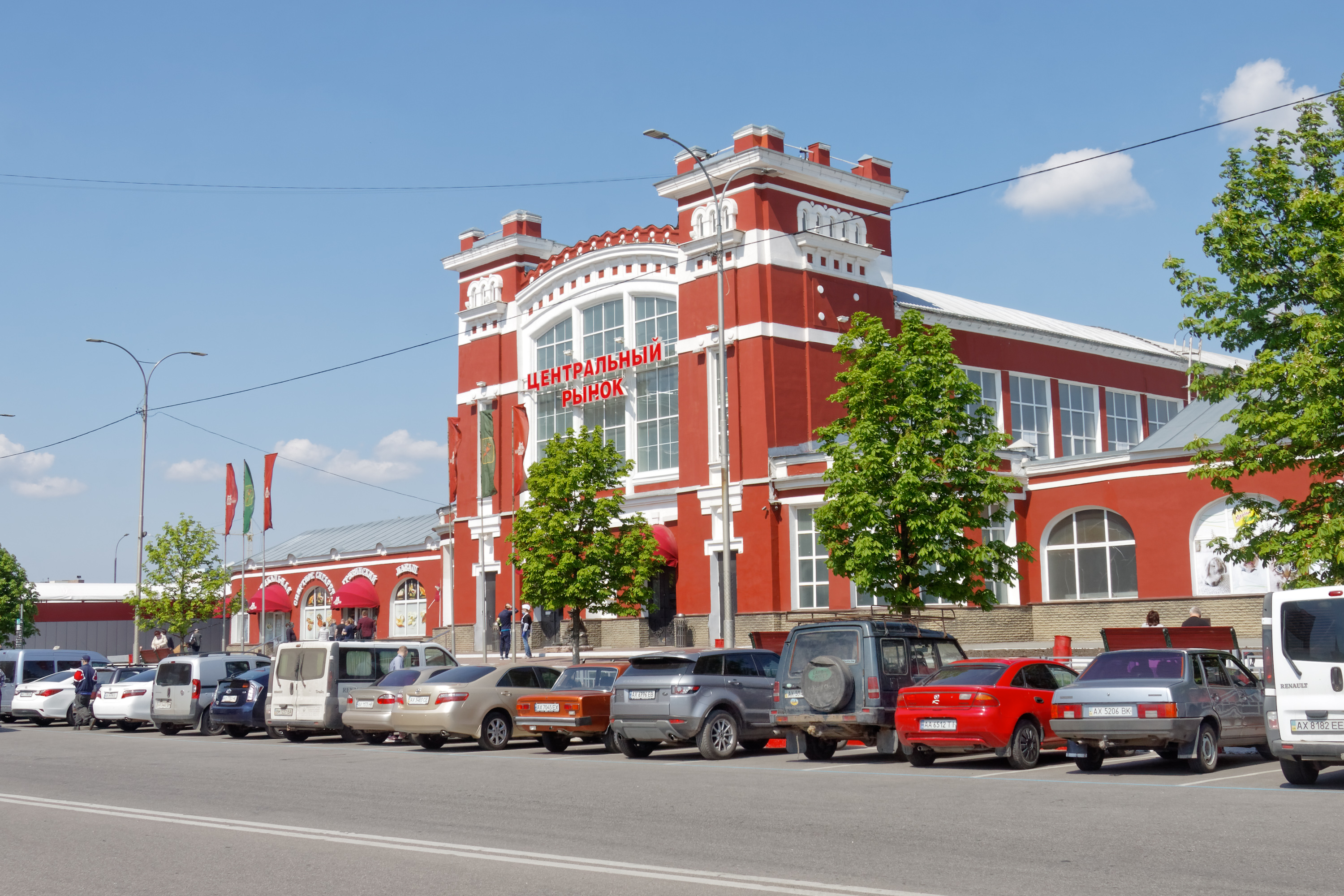
Kharkiv Central Market Hall

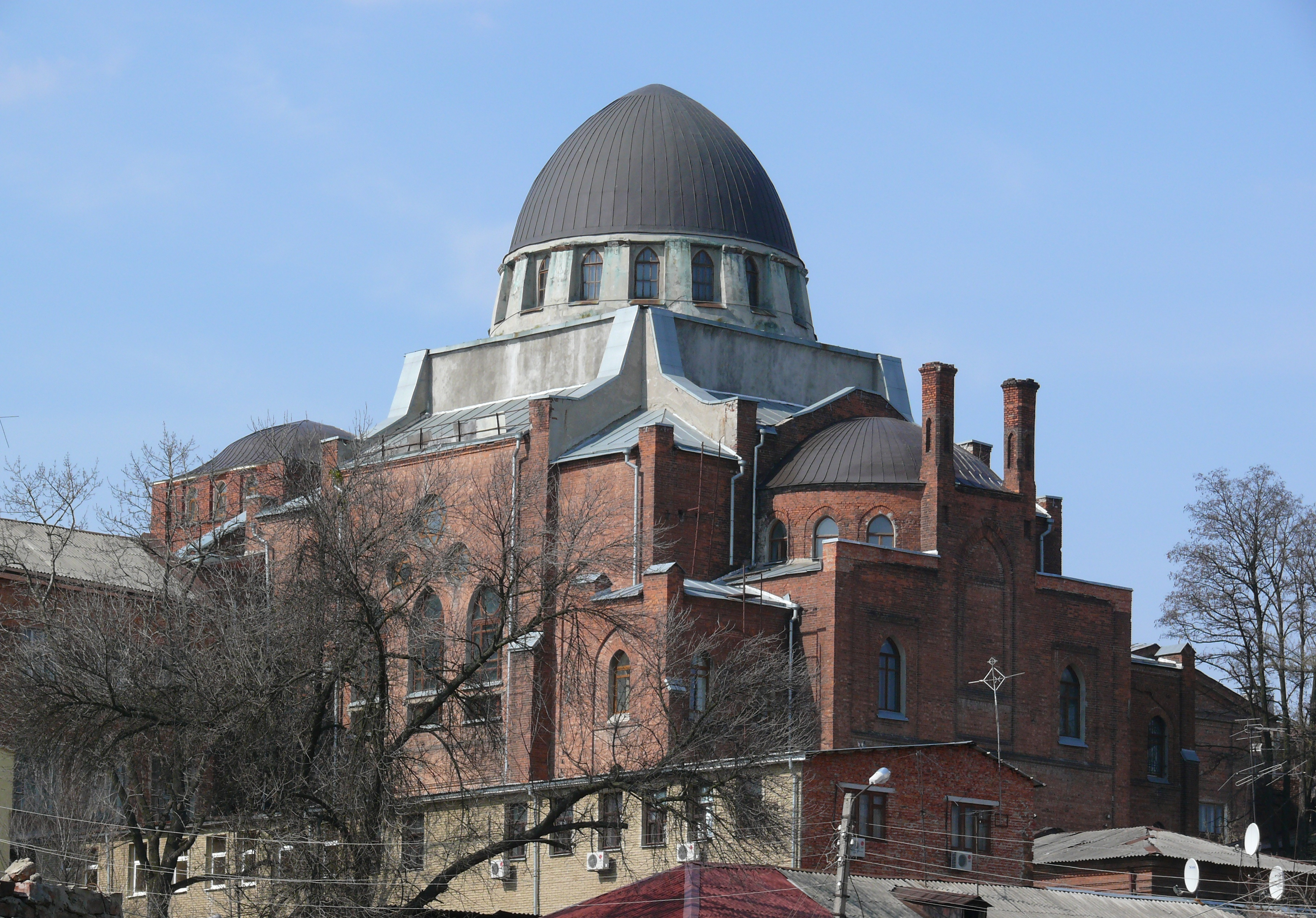
Kharkiv Choral Synagogue

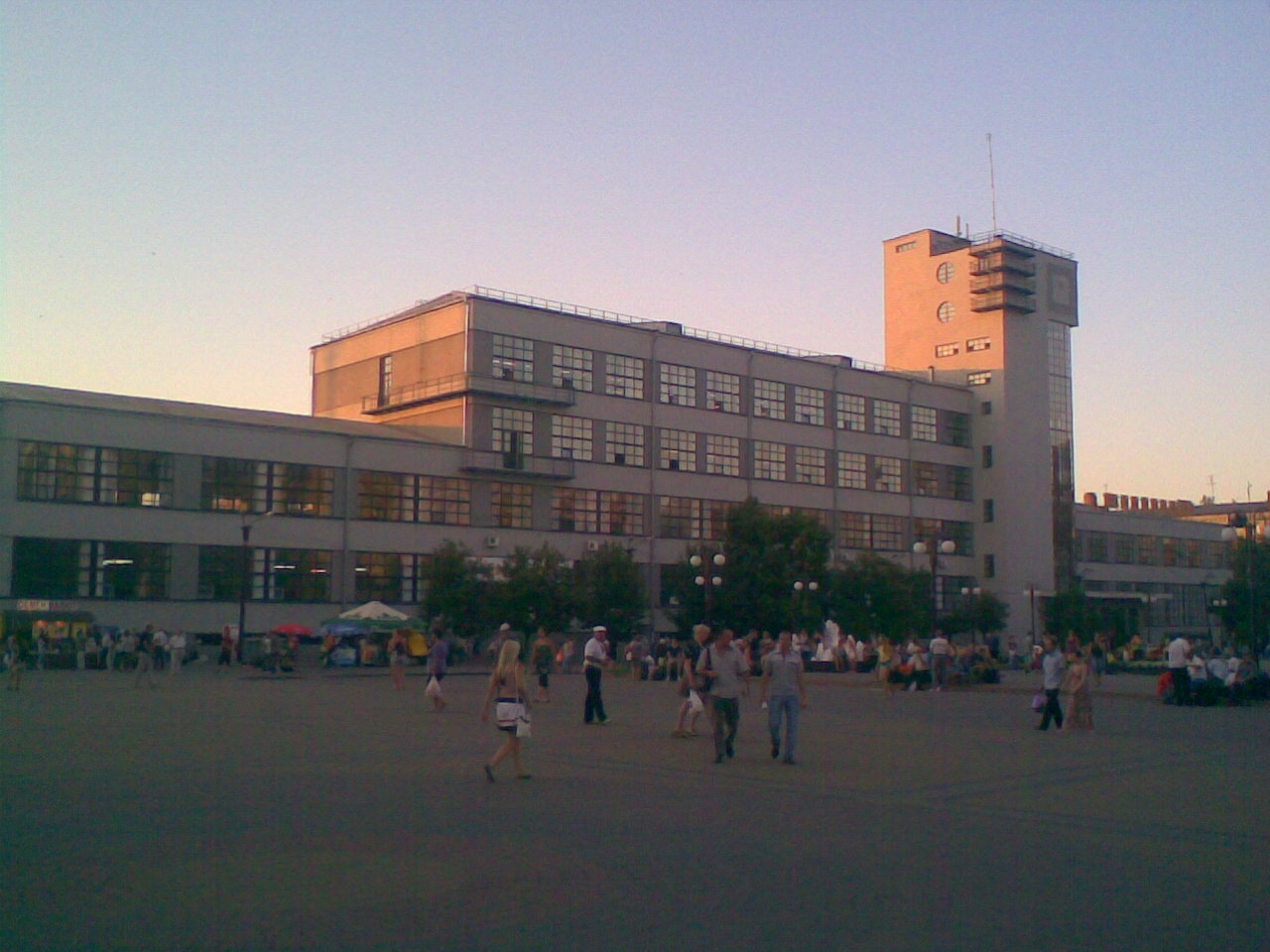
Railway Pochtamt (post office)

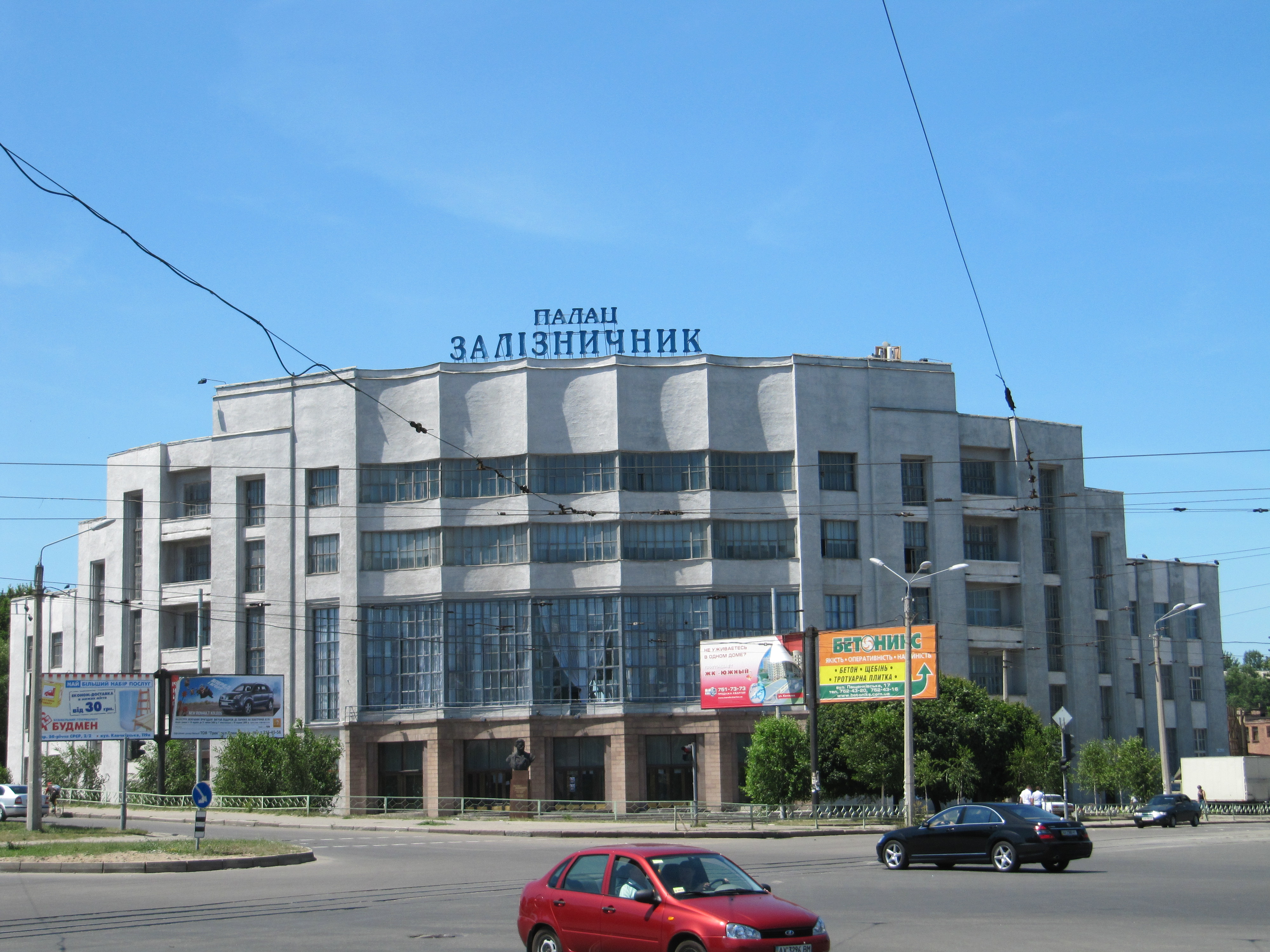
Palace of Culture of Railway Workers

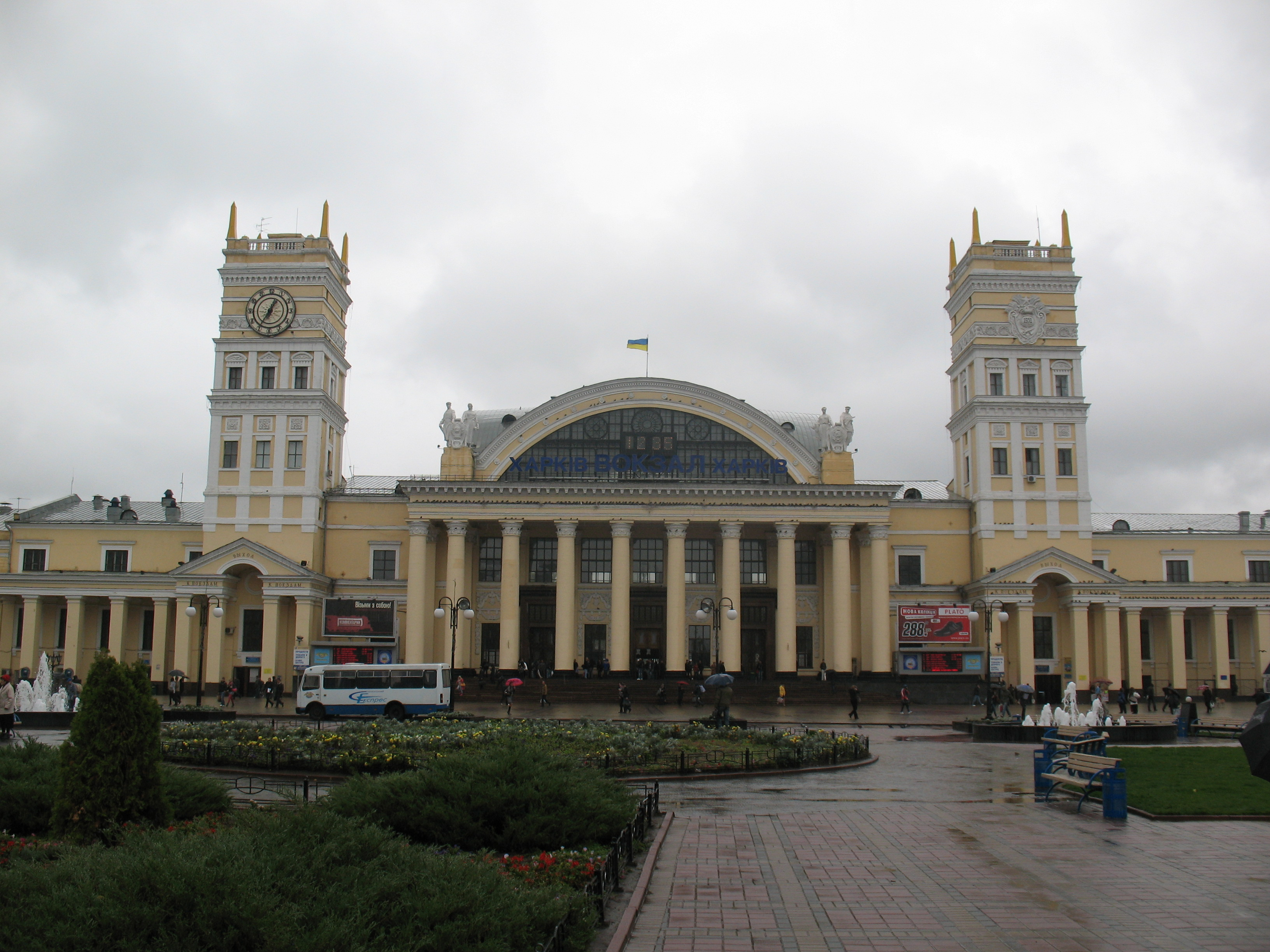
Kharkiv railway station

=== Parks ===
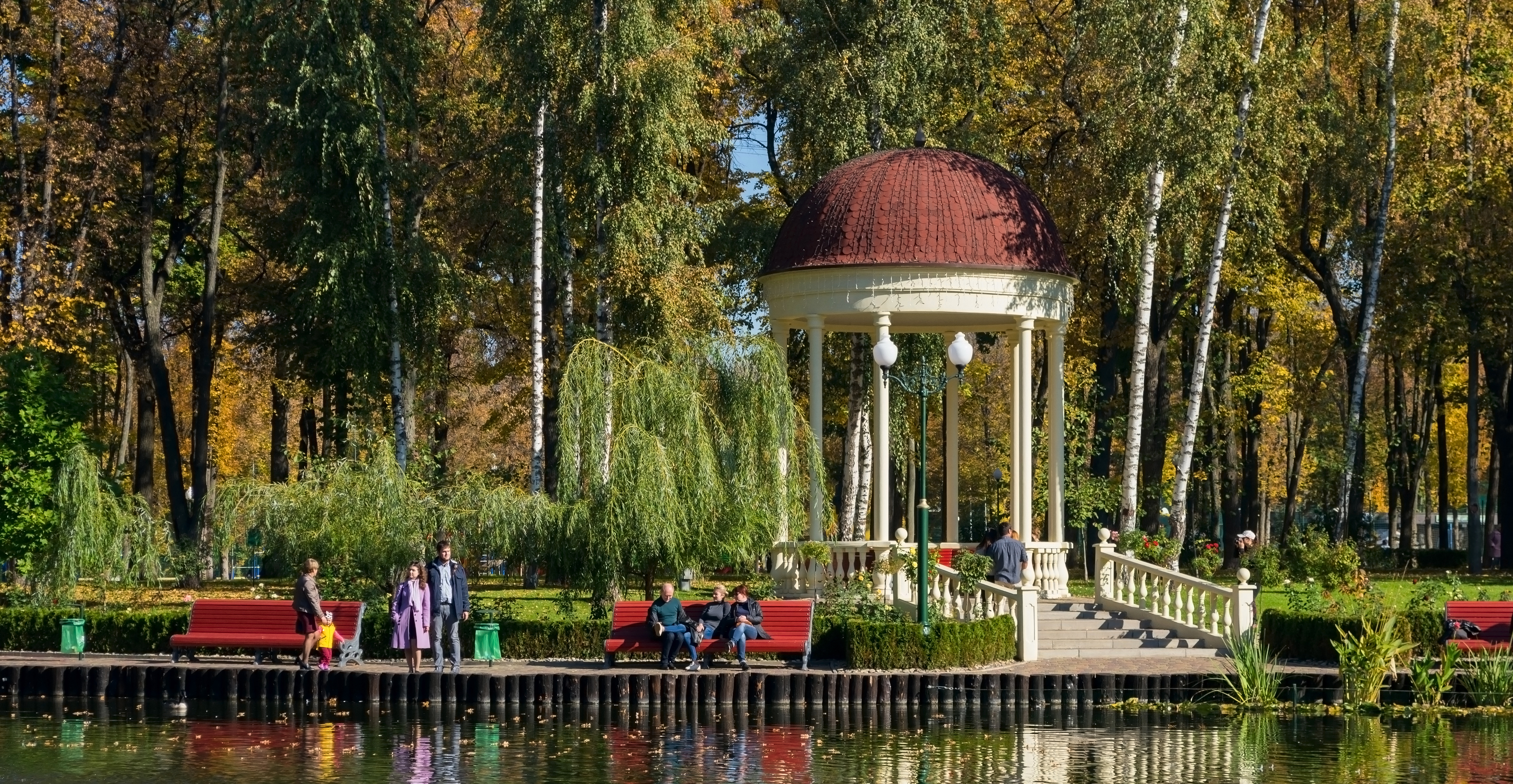
Central Park is one of the main family attractions in Kharkiv.

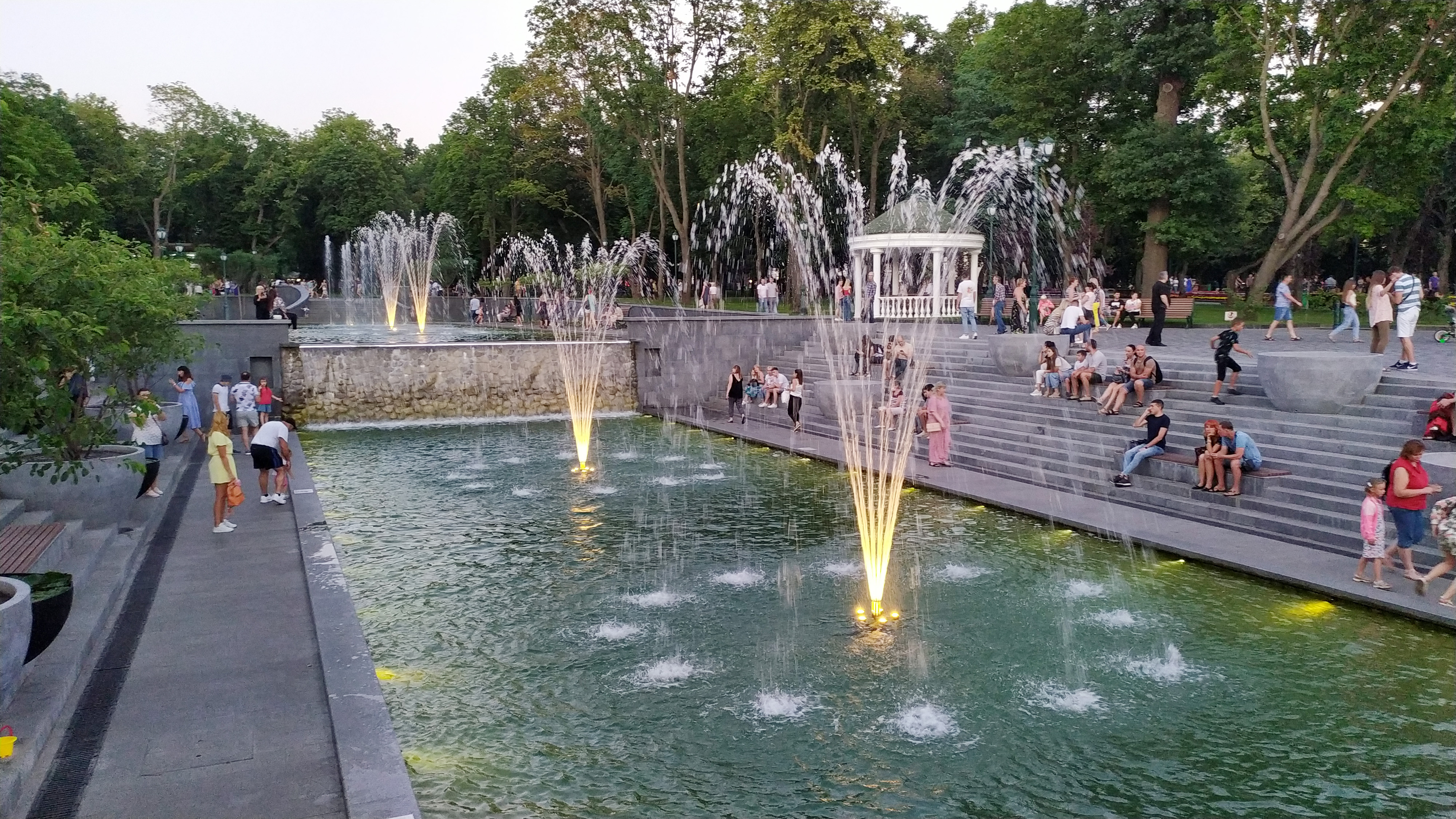
Fountains in Taras Shevchenko's garden

Kharkiv contains numerous parks and gardens such as the Central Park, Taras Shevchenko Garden, Zhuravlivskyi Hydropark, Strelka park, Sarzhyn Yar and Feldman ecopark. The Central Park is a common place for recreation activities among visitors and local people. The Shevchenko Garden is situated in close proximity to the V.N. Karazin Kharkiv National University. It is also a common place for recreation activities among the students, professors, locals and foreigners.

The Ecopark is situated at circle highway around Kharkiv. It attracts kids, parents, students, professors, locals and foreigners to undertake recreation activities. Sarzhyn Yar is a natural ravine three minutes walk from "Botanichniy Sad" station. It is an old girder that now – is a modern park zone more than 12 km in length. There is also a mineral water source with cupel and a sporting court.

==== Kharkiv Zoo ====
Kharkiv Zoological Park (commonly known as Kharkiv Zoo) is a state-owned zoo in Kharkiv. It is the oldest zoo in Ukraine, established in 1896 and opened to visitors in 1903. It is located in the city's Nahorny district, within the Taras Shevchenko Garden.

In 1983, the zoo was designated a nature conservation site of republican significance within the Ukrainian SSR. In 1992, in accordance with the Law of Ukraine "On the Nature Reserve Fund of Ukraine," the institution received the status of a zoological park of national importance.

The zoo houses representatives of rare and endangered species listed in the Red Data Book of Ukraine and the IUCN Red List (including the American alligator, Cuban crocodile, Asian elephant, Przewalski's horse, chimpanzee, jaguar, Bengal and Sumatran tigers, and Burmese python, among others). Appropriate living conditions that approximate their natural habitats have been created for these animals, along with specialized dietary plans; several rare species successfully breed in captivity.

== Language ==
The majority spoken language in Kharkiv is Russian. Even after Ukraine gained its independence, Russian was still used predominantly by ethnic Russians and Ukrainians alike, although after the onset of the 2022 Russian invasion of Ukraine, many of the city's residents attempted to transition to Ukrainian.

== Media ==
There are a large number of broadcast and internet TV channels, AM/FM/PM/internet radio-stations, and paper/internet newspapers in Kharkiv. Some are listed below.

=== Newspapers ===
- Slobidskyi Krai
- Vremya
- Vecherniy Kharkov
- Segodnya
- Vesti
- Kharkovskie Izvestiya

=== Magazines ===
- Guberniya

=== TV stations ===
- "7 kanal" channel
- "А/ТВК" channel
- "Simon" channel
- "ATN Kharkiv" channel
- "UA: Kharkiv" channel

=== Radio stations ===
- Promin
- Ukrainske Radio
- Radio Kharkiv
- Kharkiv Oblastne Radio
- Russkoe Radio Ukraina
- Shanson
- Retro FM

=== Online news in English ===
- The Kharkiv Times
- Kharkiv Observer

== Transport ==
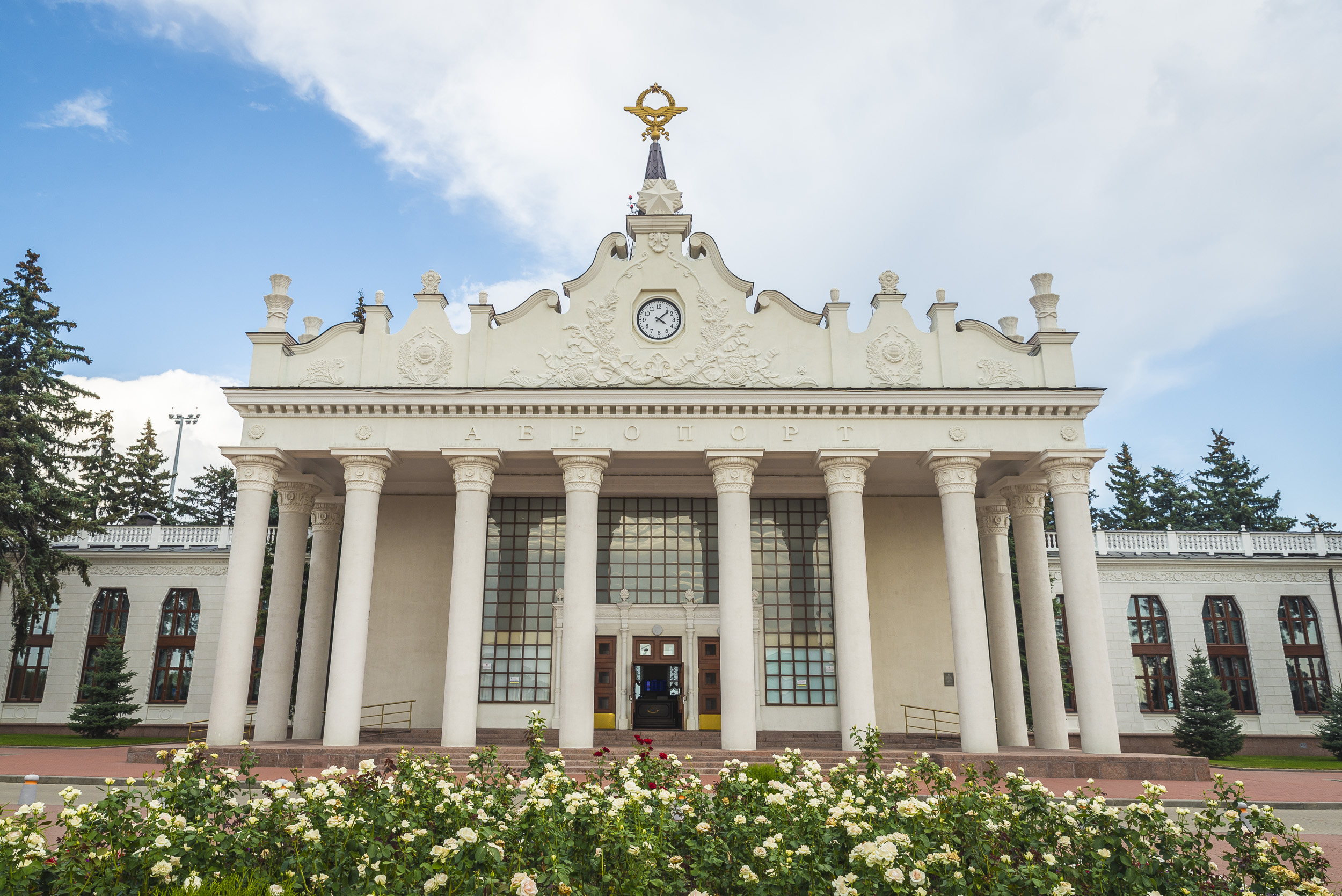
Historical building of Kharkiv Airport

The city of Kharkiv has been one of the largest transportation centers in Ukraine, connected to numerous other cities of the world by air, rail and road traffic. Kharkiv is one of four Ukrainian cities with a subway system.

Kharkiv's Metro is the city's rapid transit system operating since 1975. It includes three different lines with 30 stations in total. Trolleybuses, trams (which celebrated its 100-year anniversary of service in 2006), and marshrutkas (private minibuses) are also important means of transportation in the city.

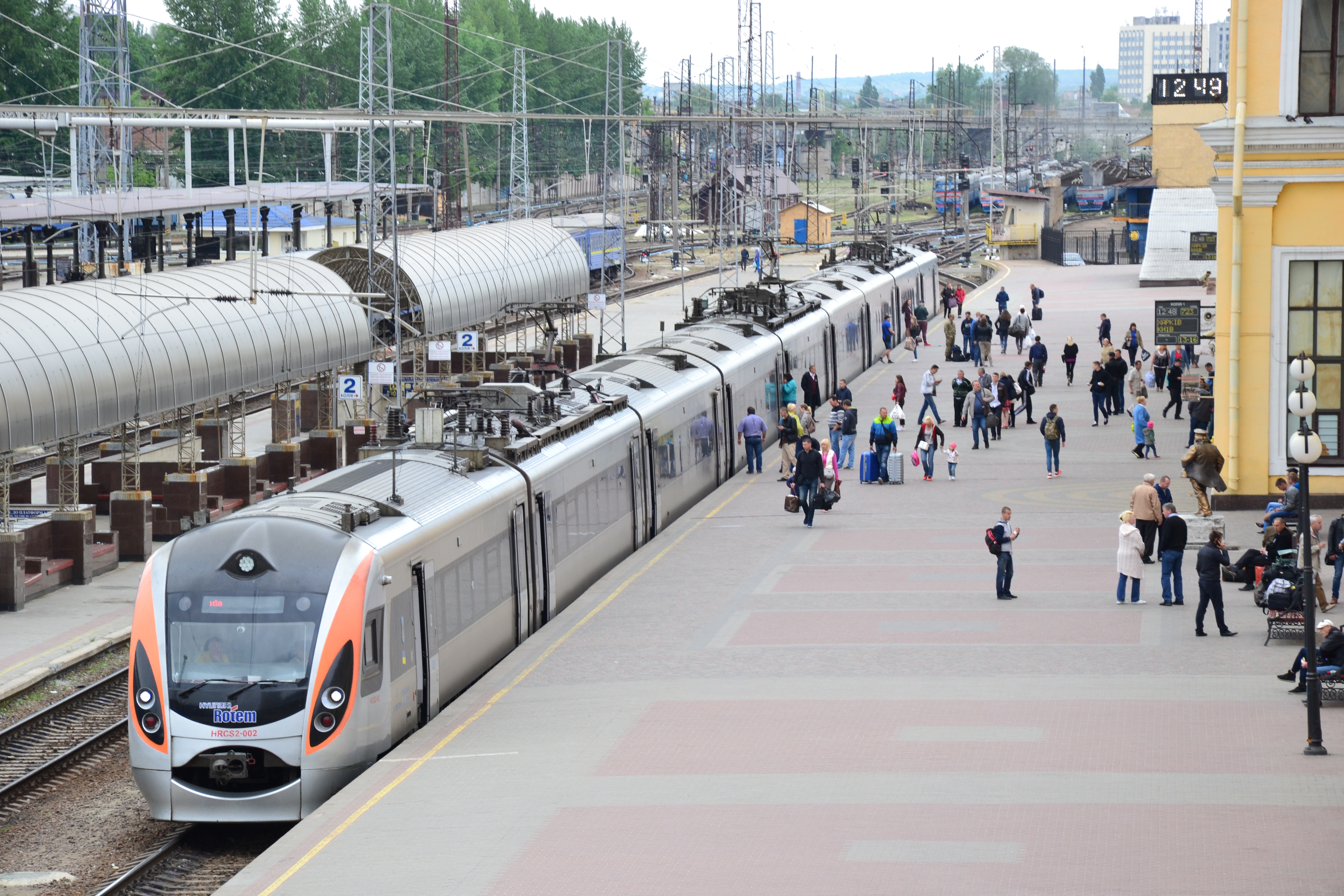
Kharkiv railway station

The first railway connection of Kharkiv was opened in 1869. The first train to arrive in Kharkiv came from the north on 22 May 1869, and on 6 June 1869, traffic was opened on the Kursk–Kharkiv–Azov line. Kharkiv's passenger railway station was reconstructed and expanded in 1901, to be later destroyed in the Second World War. A new Kharkiv railway station was built in 1952.

Kharkiv is connected with all main cities in Ukraine and abroad by regular railway services. Regional trains known as elektrychkas connect Kharkiv with nearby towns and villages.

Until the closure of Ukrainian airspace to civilian flights due to the Russian invasion of Ukraine, Kharkiv was served by Kharkiv International Airport. Charter flights are also available. The Kharkiv North Airport was an industrial airfield serving the Antonov aircraft company.

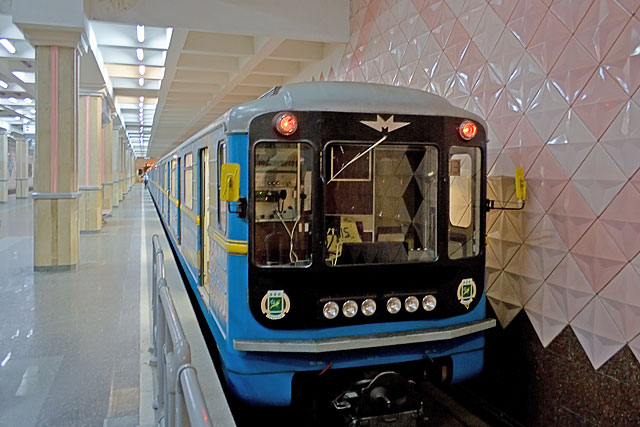
Kharkiv Metro

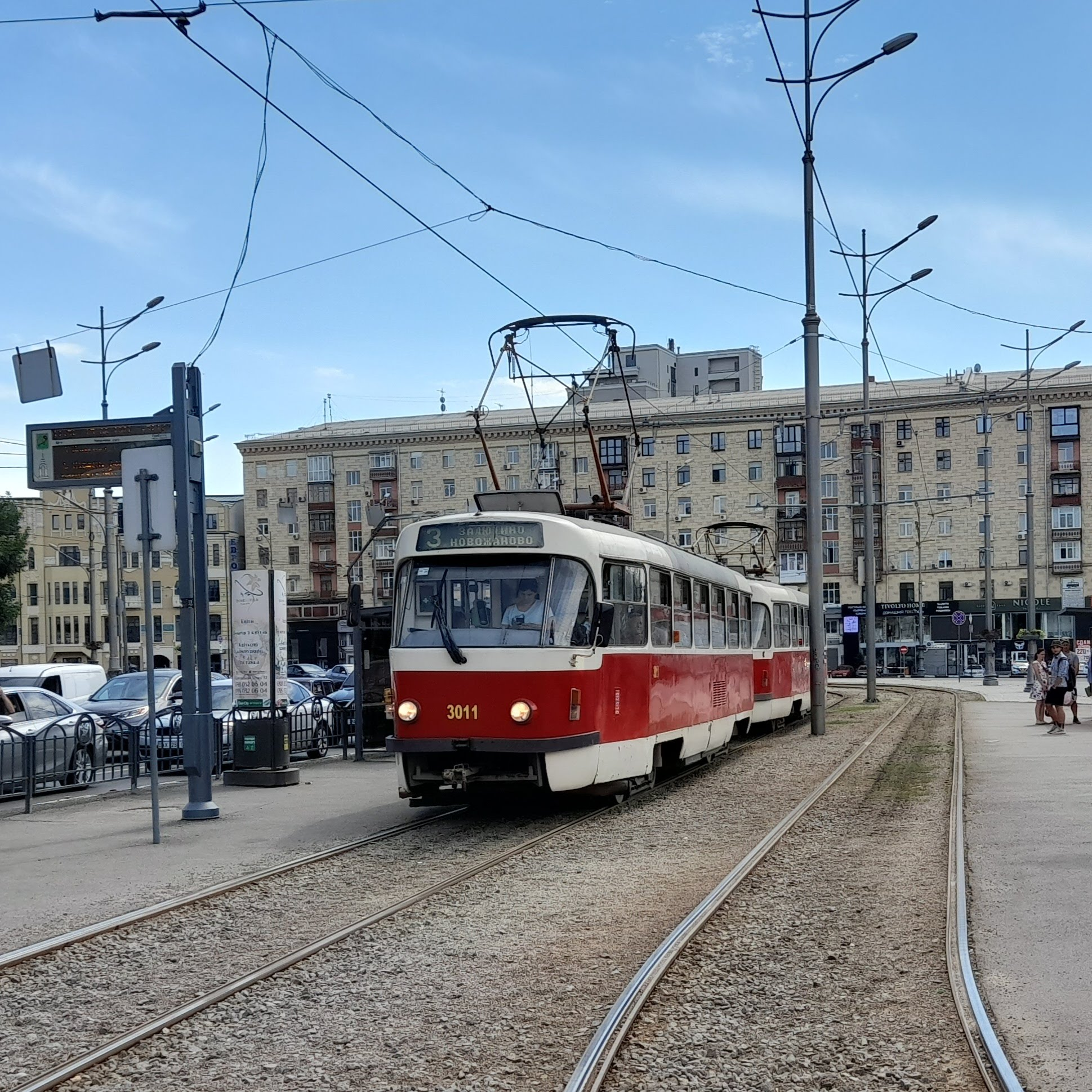
Kharkiv Tram

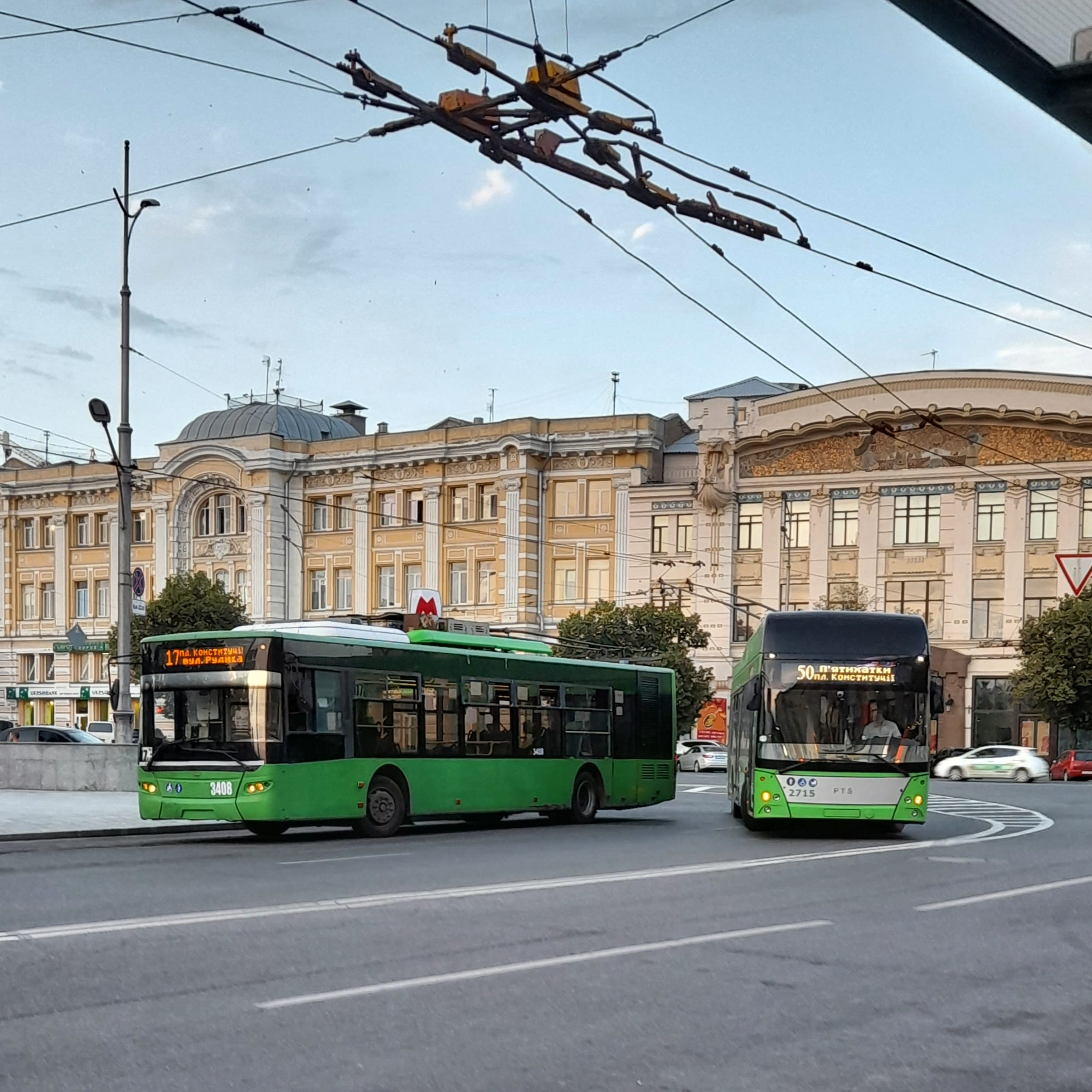
Kharkiv Trolleybus

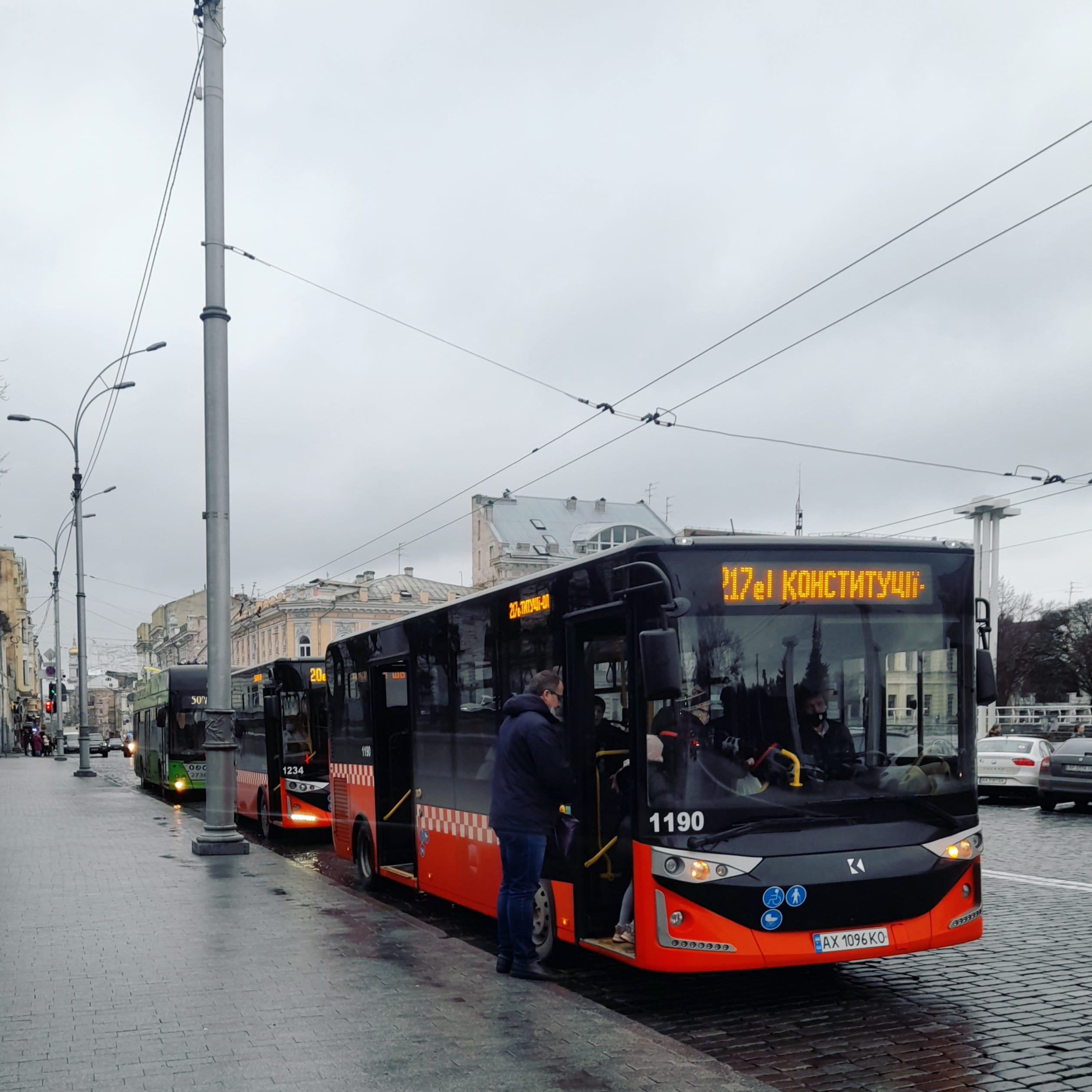
Kharkiv Bus

== Sport ==
=== Kharkiv International Marathon ===
Prior to the Russian invasion, Kharkiv International Marathon was considered as a prime international sportive event, attracting many thousands of professional sportsmen, young people, students, professors, locals and tourists to travel to Kharkiv and to participate in the international event.

=== Football (soccer) ===
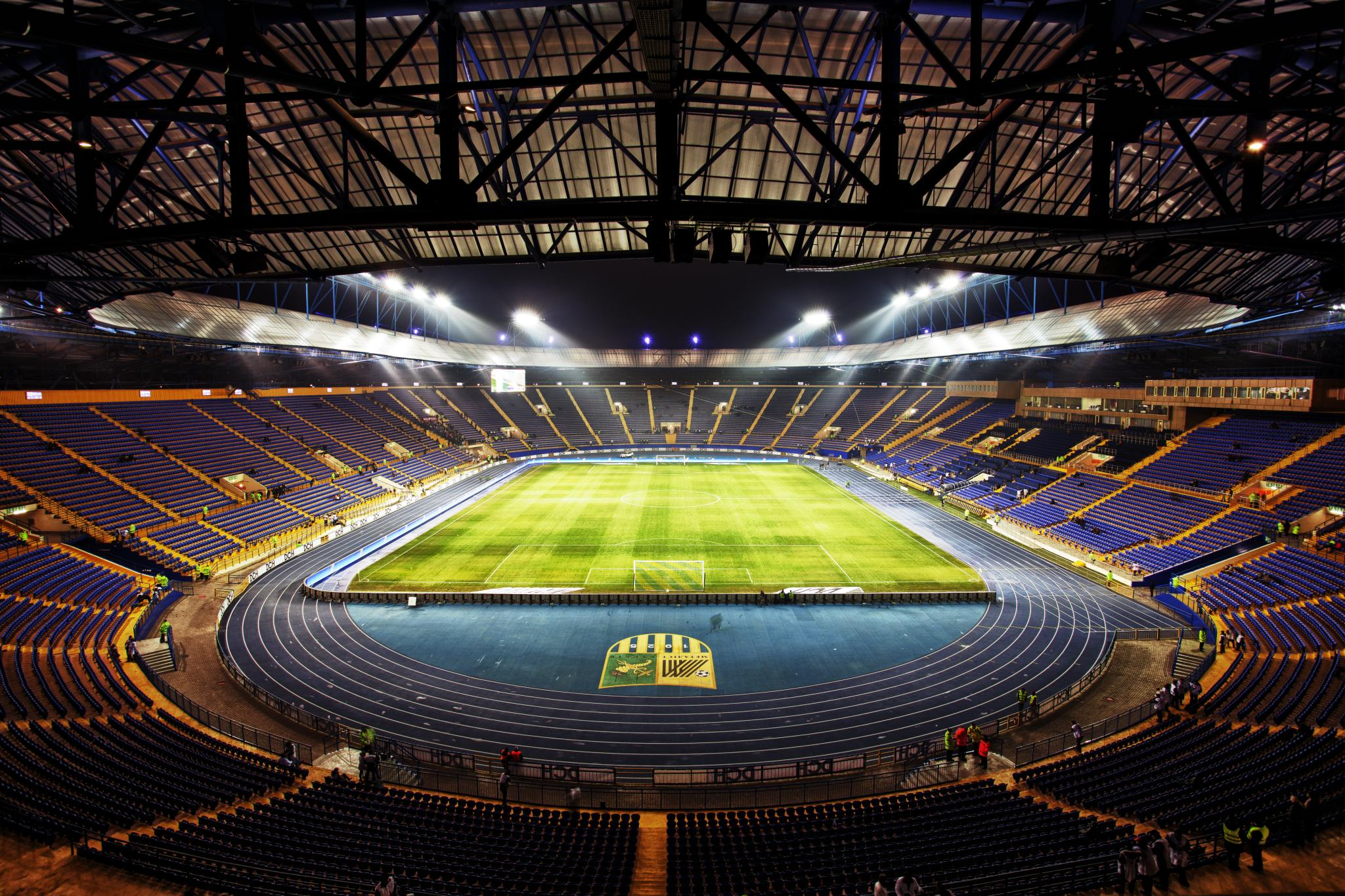
Metalist Stadium

The most popular sport was football. The city had several football clubs playing in the Ukrainian national competitions. The most successful is FC Dynamo Kharkiv that won eight national titles back in the 1920s–1930s.

- FC Metalist Kharkiv, which plays at the Metalist Stadium
- FC Metalist 1925 Kharkiv, which plays at the Metalist Stadium
- FC Helios Kharkiv, a defunct club, which played at the Helios Arena
- FC Kharkiv, a defunct club, which played at the Dynamo Stadium
- FC Arsenal Kharkiv, which played at the Arsenal-Spartak Stadium (participates in regional competitions)
- FC Shakhtar Donetsk also play at the Metalist Stadium since 2017, due to the war in Donbas

There is also a female football club WFC Zhytlobud-1 Kharkiv, which represented Ukraine in the European competitions, and like other clubs briefly suspended activity in the wake of the Russian invasion.

Metalist Stadium hosted three group matches at UEFA Euro 2012.

=== Other sports ===
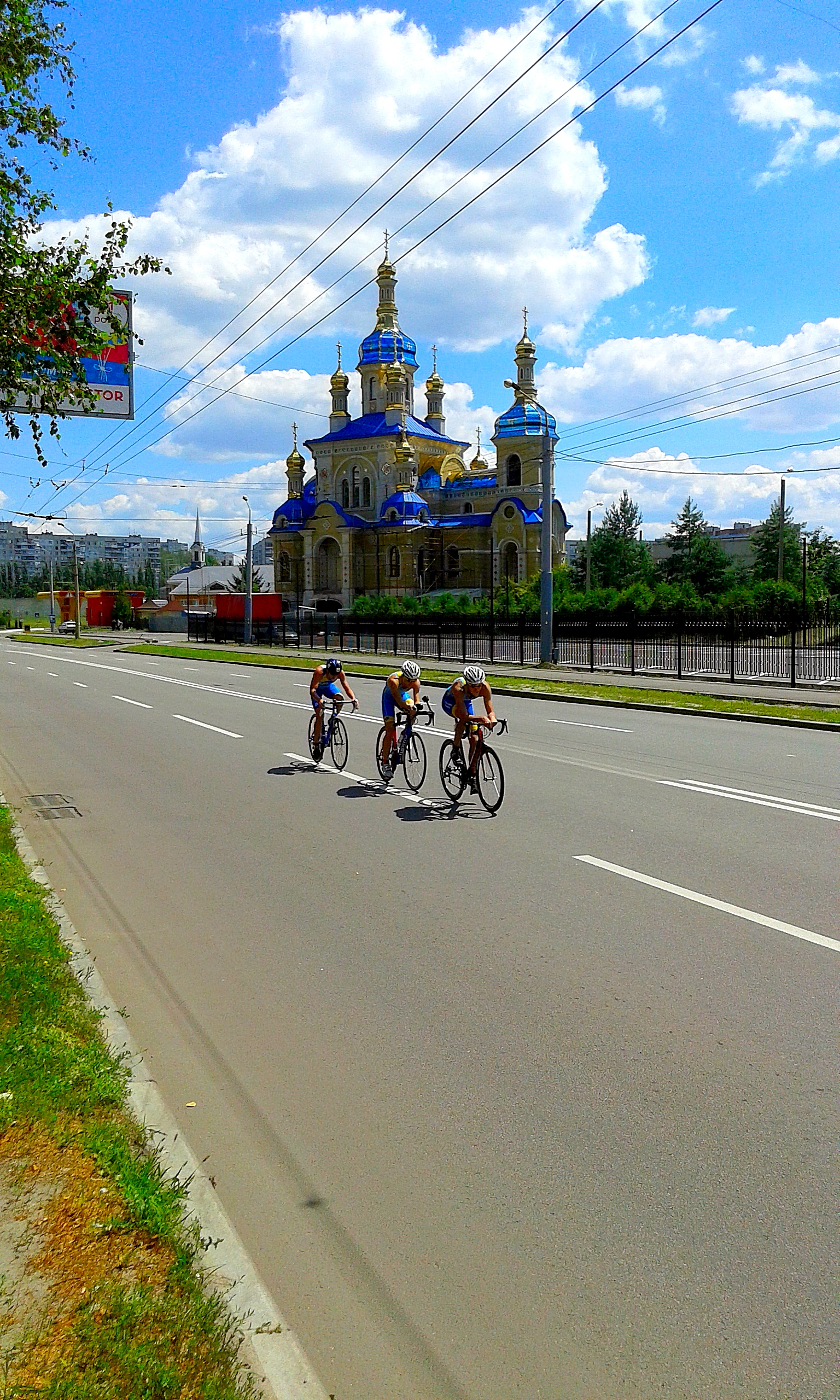
Bicycles racing competition in Kharkiv at Bicycle Day on 9 July 2016.

Kharkiv also had some ice hockey clubs, MHC Dynamo Kharkiv, Vityaz Kharkiv, Yunost Kharkiv, HC Kharkiv, who competed in the Ukrainian Hockey Championship.

Avangard Budy is a bandy club from Kharkiv, which won the Ukrainian championship in 2013.

There are a men's volleyball teams, Lokomotyv Kharkiv and Yurydychna Akademiya Kharkiv, which performed in Ukraine and in European competitions.

RC Olymp is the city's rugby union club. They provide many players for the national team.

Tennis has also been a popular sport in Kharkiv. There are many professional tennis courts in the city. Elina Svitolina is a tennis player from Kharkiv.

There is a golf club in Kharkiv.

Horseriding as a sport was also popular among locals. There were large stables and horse riding facilities at Feldman Ecopark in Kharkiv, which in 2022 were largely destroyed by Russian shelling.

There was growing interest in cycling among locals. Within the city, there was a large century-old bicycle manufacturer, Kharkiv Bicycle Plant, which has since converted to military production.

== Notable people ==
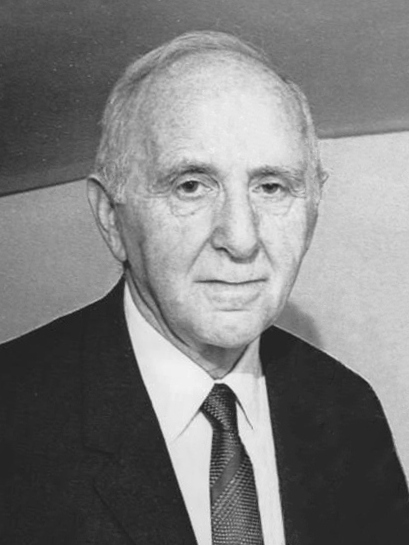
Simon Kuznets

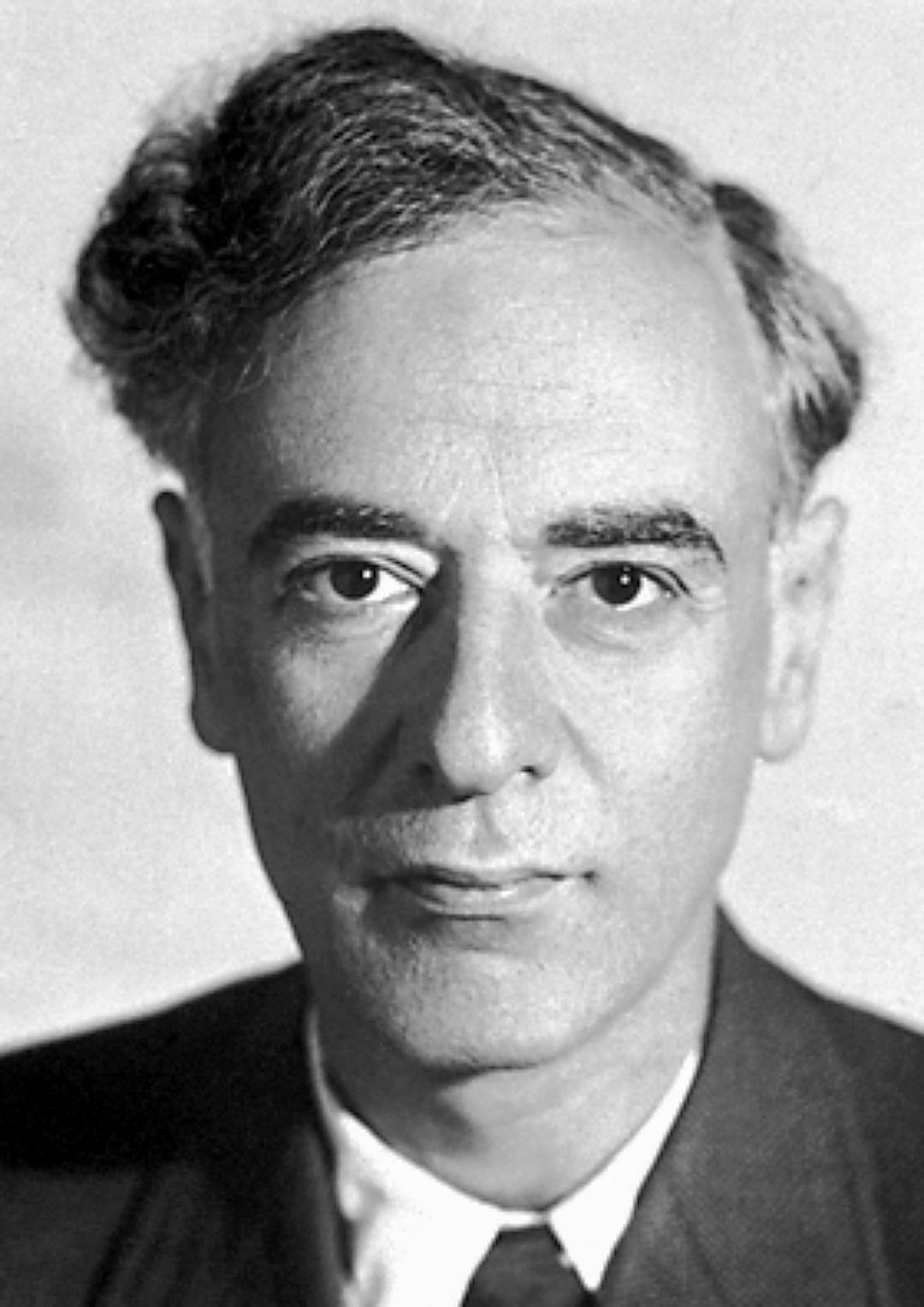
Lev Landau

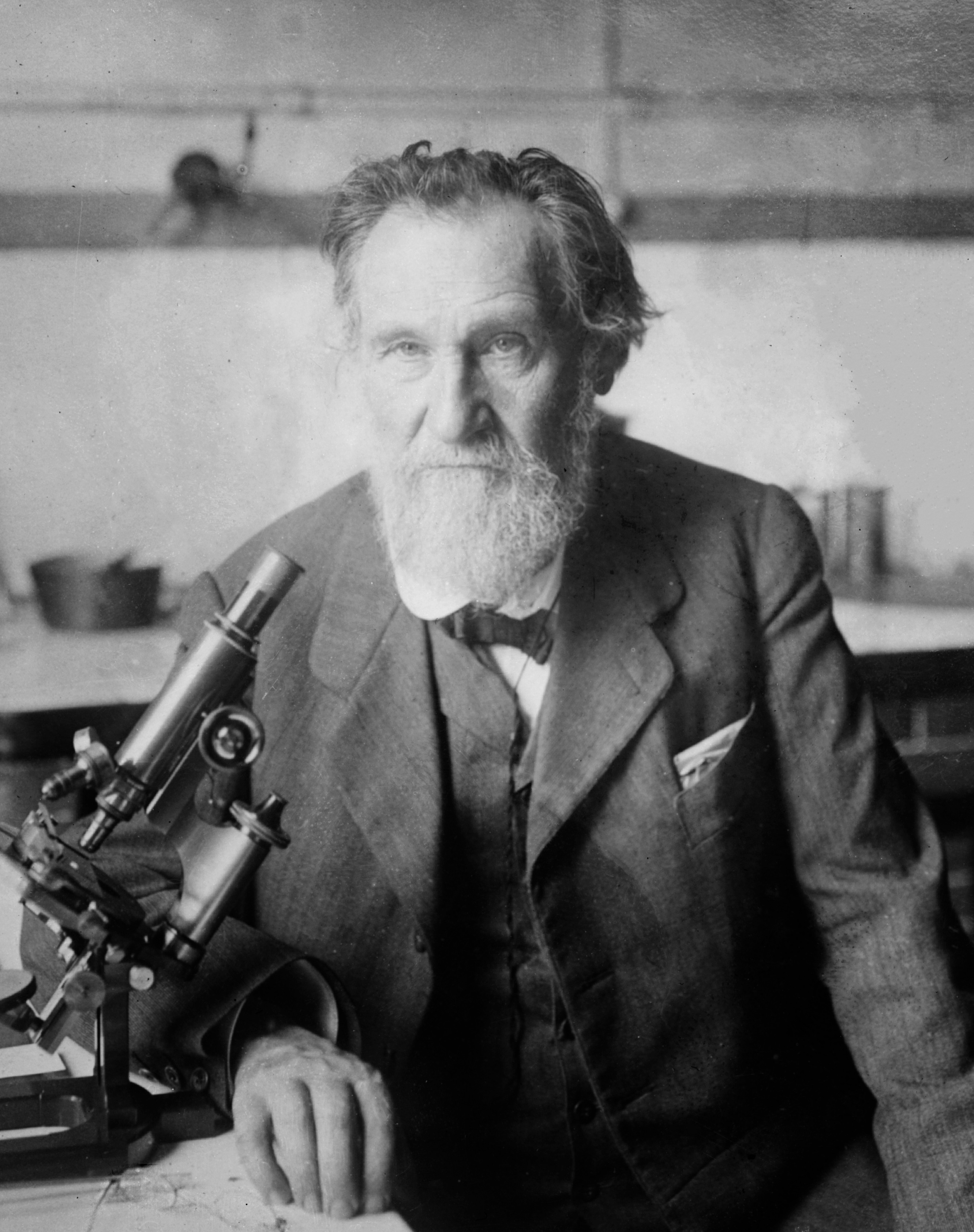
Élie Metchnikoff

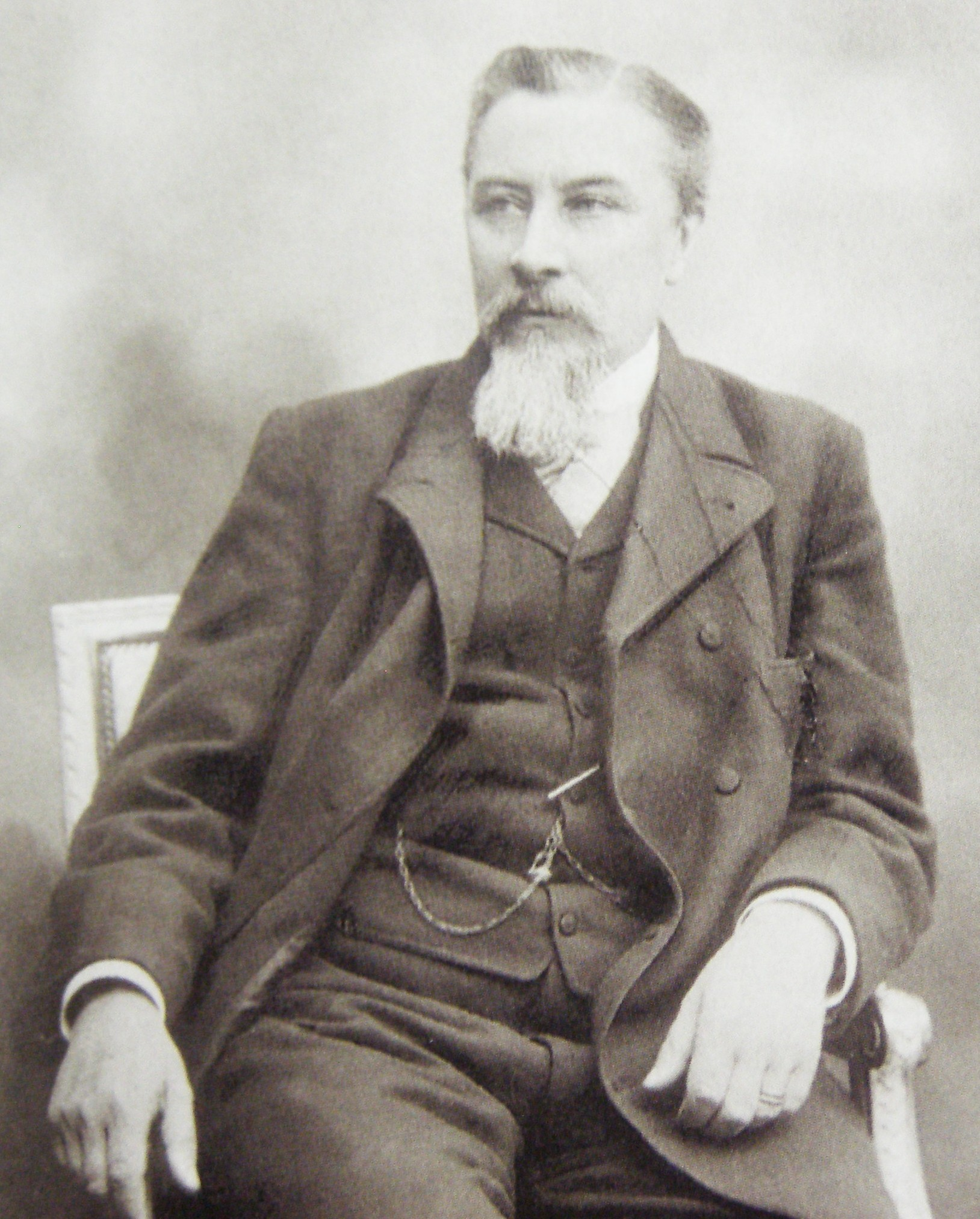
Henryk Siemiradzki

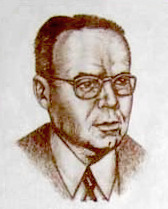
Otto Struve

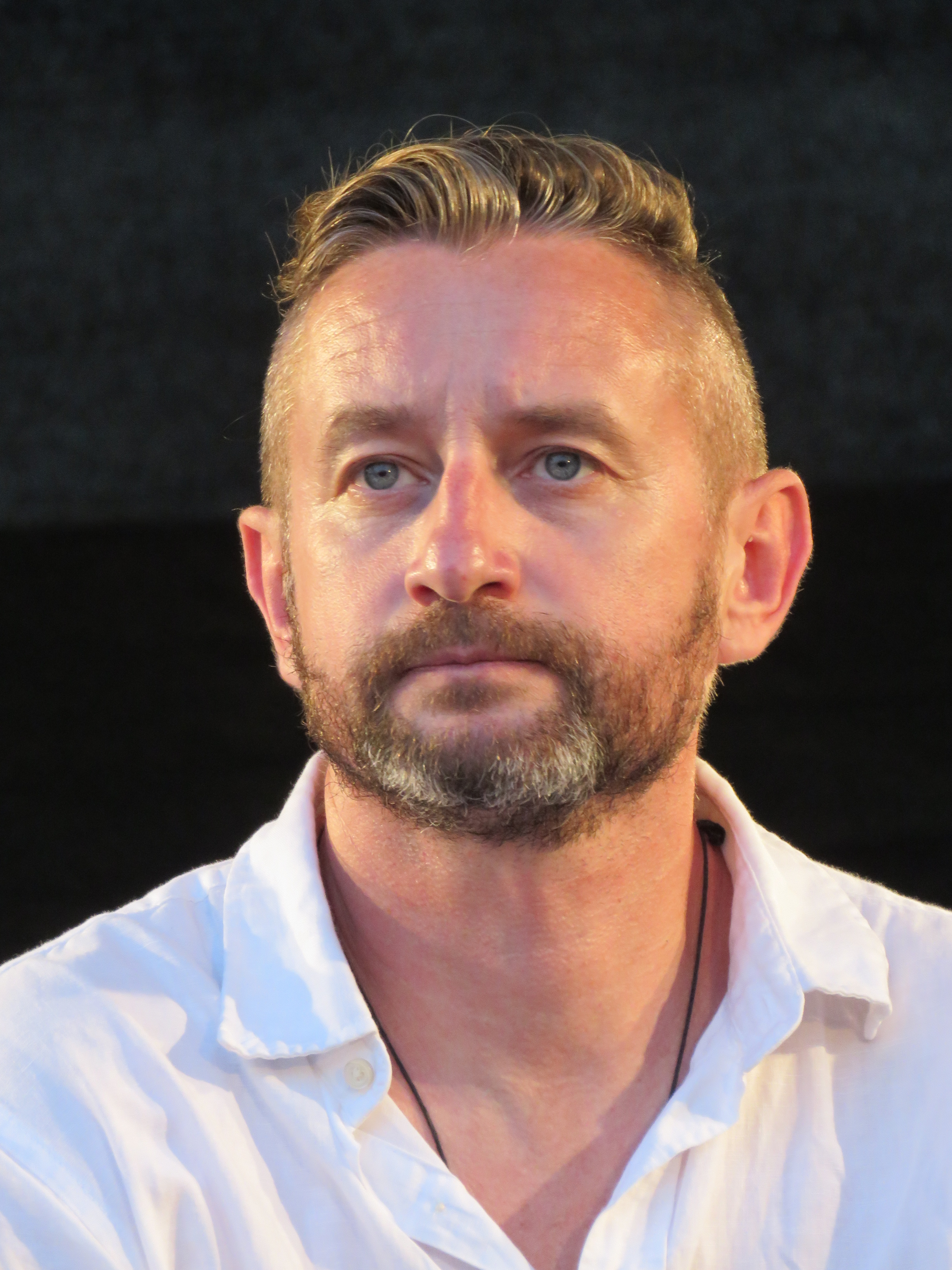
Serhiy Zhadan

- Anastasia Afanasieva (born 1982) – psychiatrist, poet, writer, translator
- Serhii Babkin (born 7 November 1978) – singer and actor
- Snizhana Babkina (born 1985) – actress and music manager
- Nikolai P. Barabashov (1894–1971) – astronomer, co-author of the first pictures of the far side of the Moon
- Pavel Batitsky (1910–1984) – Soviet military leader
- Vladimir Bobri (1898–1986) – illustrator, author, composer, educator and guitar historian
- Inna Bohoslovska (born 1960) – lawyer, politician and leader of the Ukrainian public organization Viche
- Sergei Bortkiewicz (1877–1952) – Russian Romantic composer and pianist
- Maria Burmaka (born 1970) – Ukrainian singer, musician and songwriter
- Leonid Bykov (1928–1979) – Soviet actor, film director, and script writer
- Cassandre (1901–1968) – Ukrainian-French painter, commercial poster artist, and typeface designer
- Juliya Chernetsky (born 1982) – TV host, actress, model, and music promoter in the US. (Mistress Juliya)
- Denys Chernyshov (born 1974) – Ukrainian politician and economist
- Andrey Denisov (born 1952) – Russian diplomat in China
- Vladimir Drinfeld (born 1954) – mathematician, awarded Fields Medal in 1990
- Isaak Dunayevsky (1900–1955) – Soviet composer and conductor
- Ze'ev Elkin (born 1971) – Israeli politician
- Konstanty Gorski (1859–1924) – Polish composer, violist, organist and music teacher
- Valentina Grizodubova (1909–1993) – one of the first female pilots in the Soviet Union
- Lyudmila Gurchenko (1935–2011) – Soviet and Russian actress, singer and entertainer
- Mikhail Gurevich (1892–1976) – Soviet aircraft designer, a partner (with Artem Mikoyan) of the MiG military aviation bureau
- Diana Harkusha (born 1994) – Miss Ukraine Universe 2014 and Miss Universe 2014's 2nd Runner-up
- Leonid Haydamaka (1898–1991) – bandurist and conductor
- Vasily Karazin (1773–1842) – founder of National University of Kharkiv, which bears his name
- Hnat Khotkevych (1877–1938) – writer, ethnographer, composer, bandurist
- Mikhail Koshkin (1898–1940)– chief designer of the T-34 Soviet tank
- Olga Krasko (born 1981) – Russian actress
- Mykola Kulish (1892–1937) – Ukrainian prose writer, playwright and pedagogue
- Les Kurbas (1887–1937) – movie and theatre director and dramatist
- Simon Kuznets (1901–1985) – Russian-American economist
- Evgeny Lifshitz (1915–1985) – Soviet physicist
- Eduard Limonov (1943–2020) – writer, poet and controversial politician; grew up in Kharkiv and studied at its H.S. Skovoroda Kharkiv National Pedagogical University
- Gleb Lozino-Lozinskiy (1909–2001) – lead developer of Soviet Shuttle Buran program
- Aleksandr Lyapunov (1857–1918) – Russian mathematician and physicist, invented motion stability theory
- Boris Mikhailov (born 1938) – photographer and artist
- Mykola Mikhnovsky (1873–1924) – Ukrainian political leader and activist
- T-DJ Milana (born 1989) – DJ, composer, dancer and model, lives in Kharkiv
- Yuri Nikitin (born 1939) – Russian science fiction and fantasy writer.
- Phạm Nhật Vượng – Vietnamese entrepreneur and its first billionaire, started his business career in Kharkiv in the 1990s
- H. L. Oldie (Dmitry Gromov and Oleg Ladyzhensky) (both born 1963) – writers
- Justine Pasek (born 1979) – Miss Universe 2002
- Valerian Pidmohylny (1901–1937) – poet, novelist and literary critic
- Olga Rapay-Markish (1929–2012) – ceramicist
- Elisabetta di Sasso Ruffo (1886–1940) – Russian princess
- Serafima Schachova (born 1854) – nephrologist
- Eugen Schauman (1875–1904) – Finnish nationalist, killed Russian general NA Bobrikov
- Adolf Shapiro (born 1939) – theater director, acting teacher, playwright and author
- Alexander Shchetynsky (born 1960) – composer of solo, orchestral and choral pieces.
- George Shevelov (1908–2002) – linguist, essayist, literary historian and literary critic
- Elena Sheynina (born 1965) – children's author
- Lev Shubnikov (1901–1937) – Soviet experimental physicist, worked in the Netherlands and USSR
- Klavdiya Shulzhenko (1906–1984) – Soviet and Russian popular female singer and actress.
- Henryk Siemiradzki (1843–1902) – studied at the Kharkiv University
- Alexander Siloti (1863–1945) – Russian pianist, conductor and composer
- Hryhorii Skovoroda (1722–1794) – poet, philosopher and composer
- Karina Smirnoff (born 1978) – world champion dancer, starring on Dancing with the Stars
- Katya Soldak (Ukrainian: Катя Солдак; born 1977 in Kharkiv) journalist, filmmaker, and author
- Jura Soyfer (1912–1939) – Austrian political journalist and cabaret writer
- Otto Struve (1897–1963) – Russian-American astronomer
- Sergei Sviatchenko (born 1952) – Danish-Ukrainian artist, photographer and architect.
- Ivan Svit (1897–1989) – historian, journalist and writer
- Mark Taimanov (1926–2016) – concert pianist and chess player
- Nikolai Tikhonov (1905–1997) – a Soviet Russian-Ukrainian statesman during the Cold War.
- Yevgeniy Timoshenko (born 1988) – poker player in the US
- Andriy Tsaplienko (born 1968) – journalist, presenter, filmmaker and writer.
- Anna Tsybuleva (born 1990) – classical pianist, winner of the Leeds International Piano Competition
- Anna Ushenina (born 1985) – women's world chess champion
- Vladimir Vasyutin (1952–2002) – Soviet cosmonaut of Ukrainian descent
- Vitali Vitaliev (born 1954) – journalist and author
- Alexander Voevodin (born 1949) – biomedical scientist and educator
- Yevgania Yosifovna Yakhina (1918–1983) – composer
- Vasyl Yermylov (1894–1968) – Ukrainian and Soviet painter, avant-garde artist and designer.
- Serhiy Zhadan (born 1974) – Ukrainian poet, novelist, essayist and translator.
- Valentine Yanovna Zhubinskaya (1926–2013) Ukrainian composer, concertmistress and pianist
- Irina Zhurina (born 1946) Russian operatic coloratura soprano.
- Gamlet Zinkivsky (born 1986) – artist
- Alexander Zorich (Dmitry Gordevsky and Yana Botsman) (both born 1973) – writers
- Oksana Cherkashyna (born 1988) – actress

=== Sport ===
- Leonid Buryak (born 1953) – football coach and former footballer
- Valentina Chepiga (born 1962) – female bodybuilder and 2000 Ms. Olympia champion
- Olga Danilov (born 1973) – Israeli Olympic speed skater
- Alexander Davidovich (born 1967) – Israeli Olympic wrestler
- Mikhail Gurevich – (born 1959) a Belgian chess player.
- Oleksandr Gvozdyk (born 1987) – boxer
- Pavlo Ishchenko (born 1992) – Olympic Ukrainian-Israeli boxer
- Oleksandr Kachorenko (born 1980) – professional footballer
- Maksym Kalynychenko (born 1979) – footballer
- Igor Olshanetskyi (born 1986) – Israeli Olympic weightlifter
- Gennady Orlov (born 1945) – Russian sports journalist and former footballer
- Ivan Pravilov (1963–2012) – ice hockey coach, sexually abused a teenage student, committed suicide by hanging in prison
- Irina Press (1939–2004) – athlete who won two Olympic gold medals
- Tamara Press (1937–2021) – Soviet shot putter and discus thrower
- Oleh Ptachyk (born 1981) – retired footballer
- Sergey Richter (born 1989) – Israeli Olympic sport shooter
- Igor Rybak (1934–2005) – Olympic champion lightweight weightlifter
- Elina Svitolina (born 1994) – tennis player
- Kateryna Tabashnyk (born 1994) – high jumper
- Ievgeniia Tetelbaum (born 1991) – Israeli Olympic synchronized swimmer
- Artem Tsoglin (born 1997) – Israeli pair skater
- Yury Vengerovsky (1938–1998) – Olympic gold medal-winning volleyball player
- Igor Vovchanchyn (born 1973) – mixed martial artist
- Oleksandr Zhdanov (born 1984) – Ukrainian-Israeli footballer
- Oleksandr Zakolodny (1987–2023) – mountaineer

=== Nobel and Fields prize winners ===
- Élie Metchnikoff (1845–1916) – Russian/French zoologist; researched immunology; jointly awarded the 1908 Nobel Prize in Physiology or Medicine
- Simon Kuznets (1901–1985) – American economist and statistician; received the 1971 Nobel Memorial Prize in Economic Sciences
- Lev Landau (1908–1968) – Soviet physicist, made fundamental contributions to theoretical physics; Nobel Prize in Physics 1962
- Vladimir Drinfeld (born 1954) – mathematician now in the United States; awarded the Fields Medal in 1990

== Awards and honors ==
During the Soviet period, Kharkiv was awarded the Order of Lenin by a decree of the Presidium of the Supreme Soviet of the USSR on 4 December 1970, and the Order of the October Revolution on 22 August 1983.

Kharkiv has received the full set of awards from the Parliamentary Assembly of the Council of Europe (PACE), including the European Diploma, the Flag of Honour, the Plaque of Honour, and the Europe Prize.

On 6 March 2022, by a decree of the President of Ukraine, Kharkiv was awarded the honorary title "Hero City of Ukraine" to recognize the heroism, mass bravery, and resilience shown by its citizens in defending the city during the Russian invasion of Ukraine.

== Twin towns – sister cities ==
Kharkiv is twinned with:

- Albuquerque, United States (2023)
- Bologna, Italy (1966)
- Brno, Czech Republic (2005)
- Cetinje, Montenegro (2011)
- Cincinnati, United States (1989)
- Daejeon, South Korea (2013)
- Dallas, United States (2024)
- Daugavpils, Latvia (2006)
- Debrecen, Hungary (2016)
- Gaziantep, Turkey (2011)
- Geroskipou, Cyprus (2018)
- Jinan, China (2004)
- Kaunas, Lithuania (2001)
- Košice, Slovakia (2023)
- Kutaisi, Georgia (2005)
- Lille, France (1978)
- Lublin, Poland (2022)
- Maribor, Slovenia (2012)
- Nuremberg, Germany (1990)
- Polis, Cyprus (2018)
- Poznań, Poland (1998)
- Rishon LeZion, Israel (2008)
- Tbilisi, Georgia (2012)
- Tianjin, China (1993)
- Tirana, Albania (2017)
- Trnava, Slovakia (2013)
- Turku, Finland (2022)
- Varna, Bulgaria (1995)

== See also ==
- Grigoriev Institute for Medical Radiology
- Kharkiv fortress
