= Kharkiv Zoo =

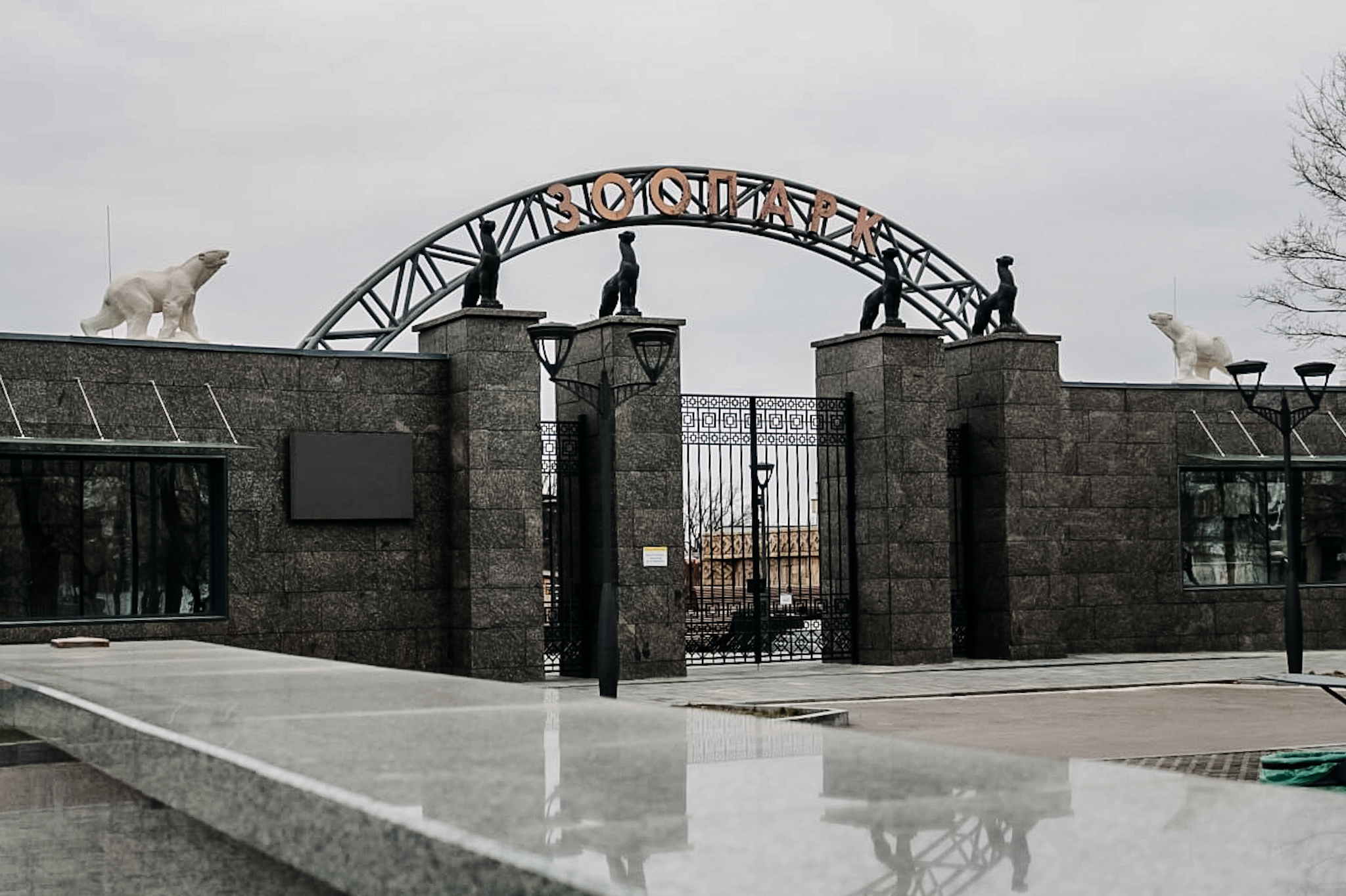
- Kharkiv Zoo entry
- Interactive map of Kharkiv Zoo
- 50°01′10″N 36°13′30″E
- Date opened: 1895
- Location: Kharkiv
- Land area: 22 acres (8.9 ha)
- No. of animals: 7240 (1 January 2013)
- No. of species: 391 (1 January 2013)
- Website: zoo.kharkiv.ua

Kharkiv Zoo is a public zoo in Park Shevchenko, Kharkiv, Ukraine. The zoo is connected to the European Association of Zoos and Aquaria. The zoo covers 22 acres and has 1,170 individual animals from 193 species.

== Collection and status ==
The zoo ranks second in Ukraine in terms of the value of its collection, after the Kyiv Zoo. The zoological park houses over 384 species of animals (8,000 individuals), including fish (137 species), amphibians (2 species), reptiles (44 species), birds (97 species), and mammals (79 species). Of these, 7 species are listed in the European Red List, 14 in the Red Book of Ukraine, and the zoo collection includes 93 species included in the Convention on International Trade in Endangered Species of Wild Fauna and Flora (CITES).

== History ==
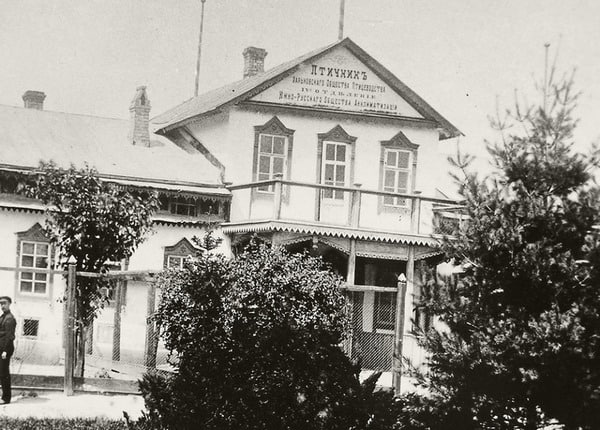
The aviary of the Kharkiv Zoo, built in 1902 (lost).

The history of the creation of the Kharkiv Zoo — the first in Ukraine — begins in the 1890s, when, on the initiative of Professor Alexander Brandt, an attempt was made to organize an "aquarium" in the city. In 1894, the board of the South Russian Acclimatization Society appealed to the rector of the Imperial Kharkov University, Mikhail Alekseyenko, with a request to lease part of the territory of the University Garden for organizing an exhibition. In 1895, on a plot (about 2.5 hectares) of land in the experimental field of the University Garden, the society opened a beekeeping and sericulture station. It was located in a wooden building designed by the brothers, architects S. I. and I. I. Zagoskin (now it is the building of the zoo's directorate).

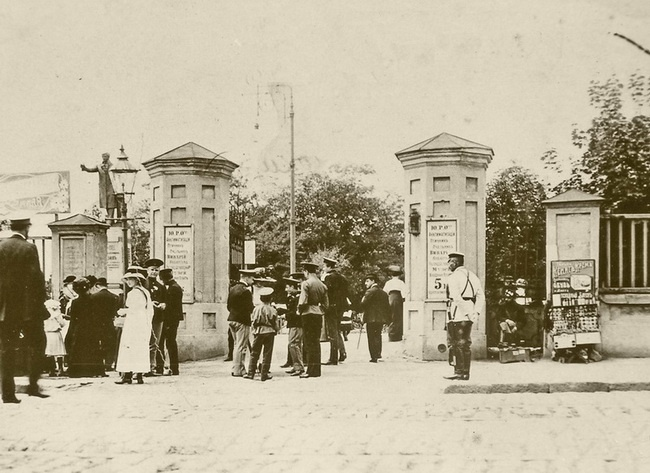
Entrance to the Kharkiv Zoo from Sumska Street. 1900s.

Initially, the collection consisted of small predators, small birds and domestic animals. In 1900, the first batch of mammals and birds arrived in Kharkiv from the acclimatization zoo in Askania-Nova. And the construction of the very "aquarium" was completed in 1906 - now it houses a terrarium. By the October Revolution, the zoo had already equipped bird aviaries and a pond for waterfowl, cages for wolves, foxes and even polar bears, and there was a monkey and a lion enclosure. After the revolution, the South Russian Acclimatization Society ceased to exist, and the Kharkiv Zoo also fell into decline. Only in 1921 did the restoration and expansion of the zoo begin with the participation of V. G. Averin, later a famous scientist and zoologist. Mykola Petrovich Ewald took the position of the head of the zoo. Already in 1926–1927, an elephant enclosure and a monkey enclosure were built, as well as warm rooms for large predators. On May 1, 1928, a zoo museum was opened. From the same period, a circle of young biologists began working at the zoo. In 1929, the zoo's territory was expanded. This allowed for a new pond and new enclosures for birds and ungulates. In 1932, the gate of the main entrance to the zoo was built according to the design of architect Shirshov. During the first decades of its existence, the area of the zoo increased 10 times and by 1941 it exhibited representatives of about 100 species of mammals, about the same number of fish, amphibians, reptiles, and more than 200 species of birds.

When World War II began, and Kharkiv was threatened with capture by German troops, M. P. Ewald was asked to stay and work in Kharkiv in order to preserve the animal collection as much as possible. He agreed, asking to help the zoo with food. Later that night, several trucks secretly drove into the zoo. A group of Red Army soldiers dug large holes and put sacks of potatoes and grain in them. However, this was not enough for long.

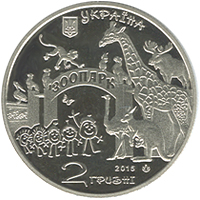
The National Bank of Ukraine commemorative coin is dedicated to the 120th anniversary of the Kharkiv Zoo

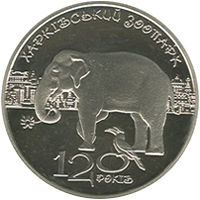

On October 24, 1941, German troops occupied Kharkiv, but they did not interfere with the work of the zoo. And when the situation at the front allowed the Germans to hope for victory, they even began to provide assistance with feeding the animals.

As of the end of June 1943, the zoo housed 28 specimens of predators, 32 specimens of ungulates, 11 monkeys, a large number of birds and many exotic fish.

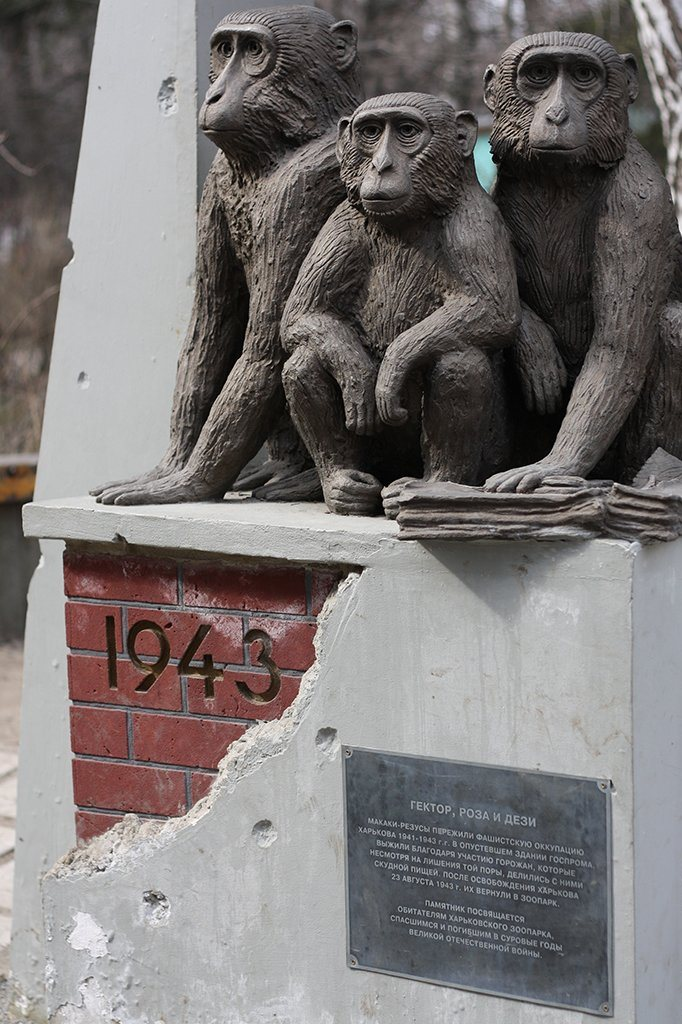
A monument dedicated to animals that survived and died during World War II

During the August battles of 1943, a large number of animals died. At the same time, the zoo lost valuable scientific materials and documents that had been kept since its founding. The veterinarians' observation logs, information on feeding and keeping animals, even drawings of buildings and communications, as well as accounting documents were lost. At the time of the liberation of Kharkiv, only four bears, five monkeys and one wolf survived in the zoo. The elephant enclosure, monkey enclosure and aquarium were partially destroyed, all fences were broken. The total damage amounted to 1 million Soviet rubles. Instead of the previous 100 employees, 40 people started working, while only 15 of them had worked at the zoo before.

On the fifth day after the liberation of Kharkiv, a resolution of the Kharkiv City Council was issued, which stated that the zoo was considered open from August 29, 1943. In 1944, the zoo received the first batch of animals. Scientific institutes returned to Kharkiv from evacuation, and in the fall of 1944, the Scientific Council under the leadership of V. G. Averin began to work at the zoo. The period of restoration and development of the zoo began.

On August 22, 2008, a monument to the zoo's inhabitants who managed to escape during the World War II was unveiled in the alley opposite the entrance to the primate house. Among the surviving inhabitants were three macaques - Hector, Rosa and Desi. They managed to escape from the destroyed monkey house during the bombing. The monkeys survived the occupation in the Derzhprom, compassionate people shared their food with them, and after the liberation of the city, the macaques were caught and returned to the zoo. It was their figurines that decorated the monument.

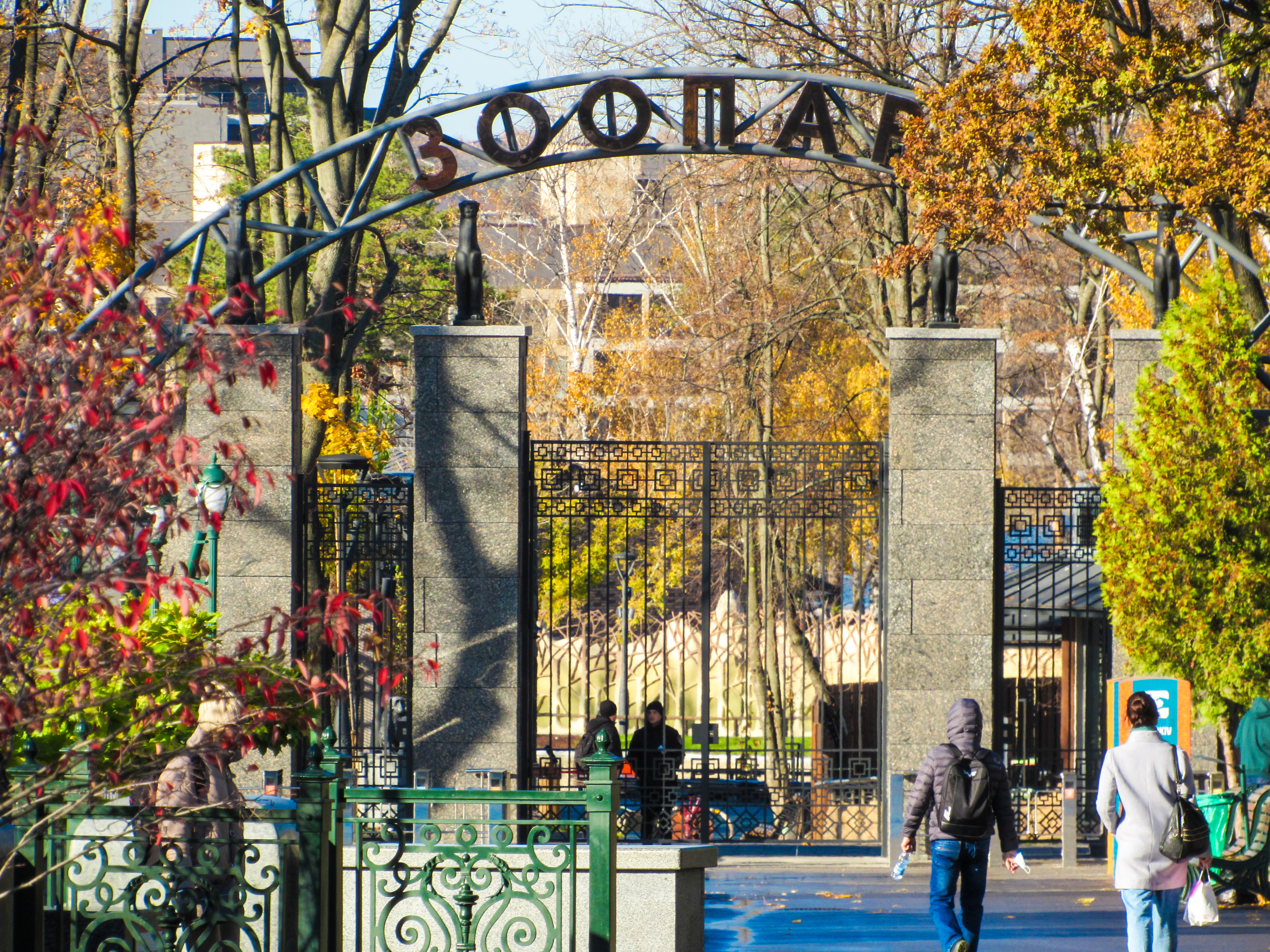
Entrance gate and arch, 2021

The zoo underwent major renovations between 2016 and 2021. During the 2022 Russian invasion of Ukraine, animals from private zoos around Ukraine, including Feldman Ecopark, were transferred to the Kharkiv Zoo for safety. In September 2022, a chimpanzee named Chichi escaped from the zoo and returned later riding a bicycle.

== Exhibits and attractions ==
The zoo has several exhibits, including the "Tiger Trail", the "African savannah" and "African safari", "Kingdom of the Elephants", "Planet of the Apes", "Wild Australia", "South America", "Inhabitants of the Mountains", and alligator exhibits.

== Gallery ==
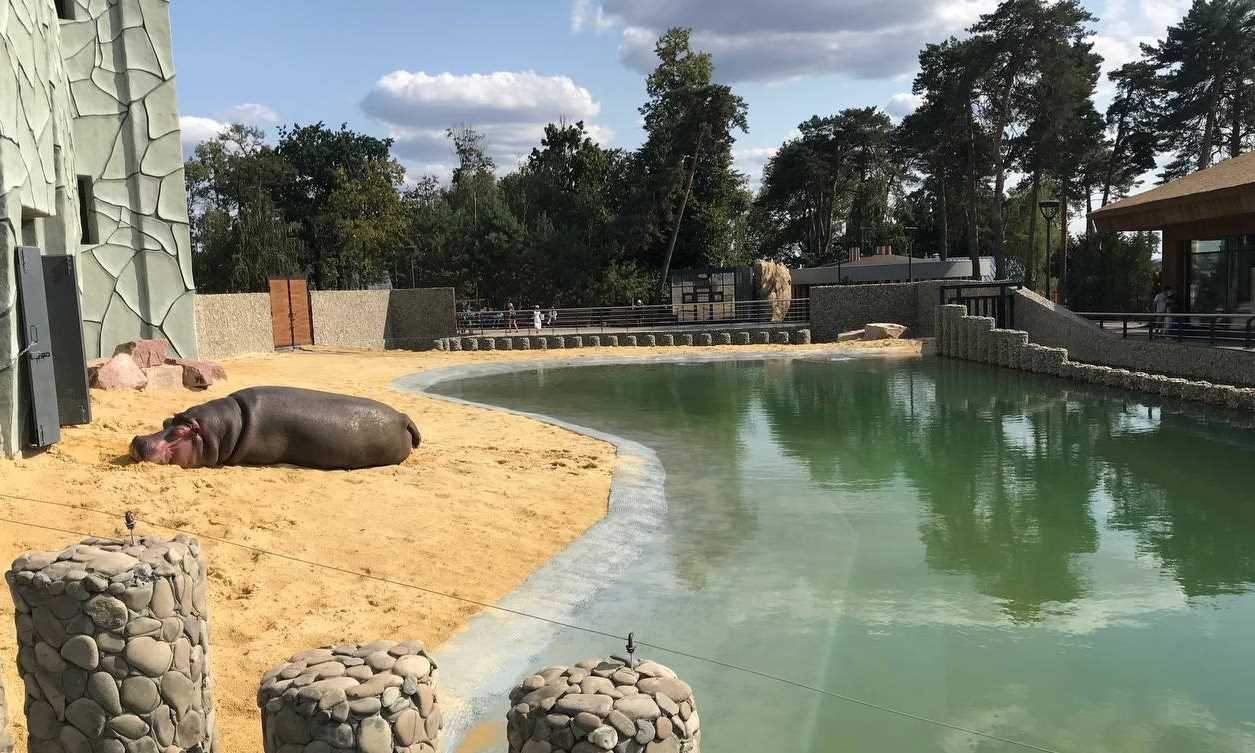
Hippopotamus in the Kharkiv Zoo

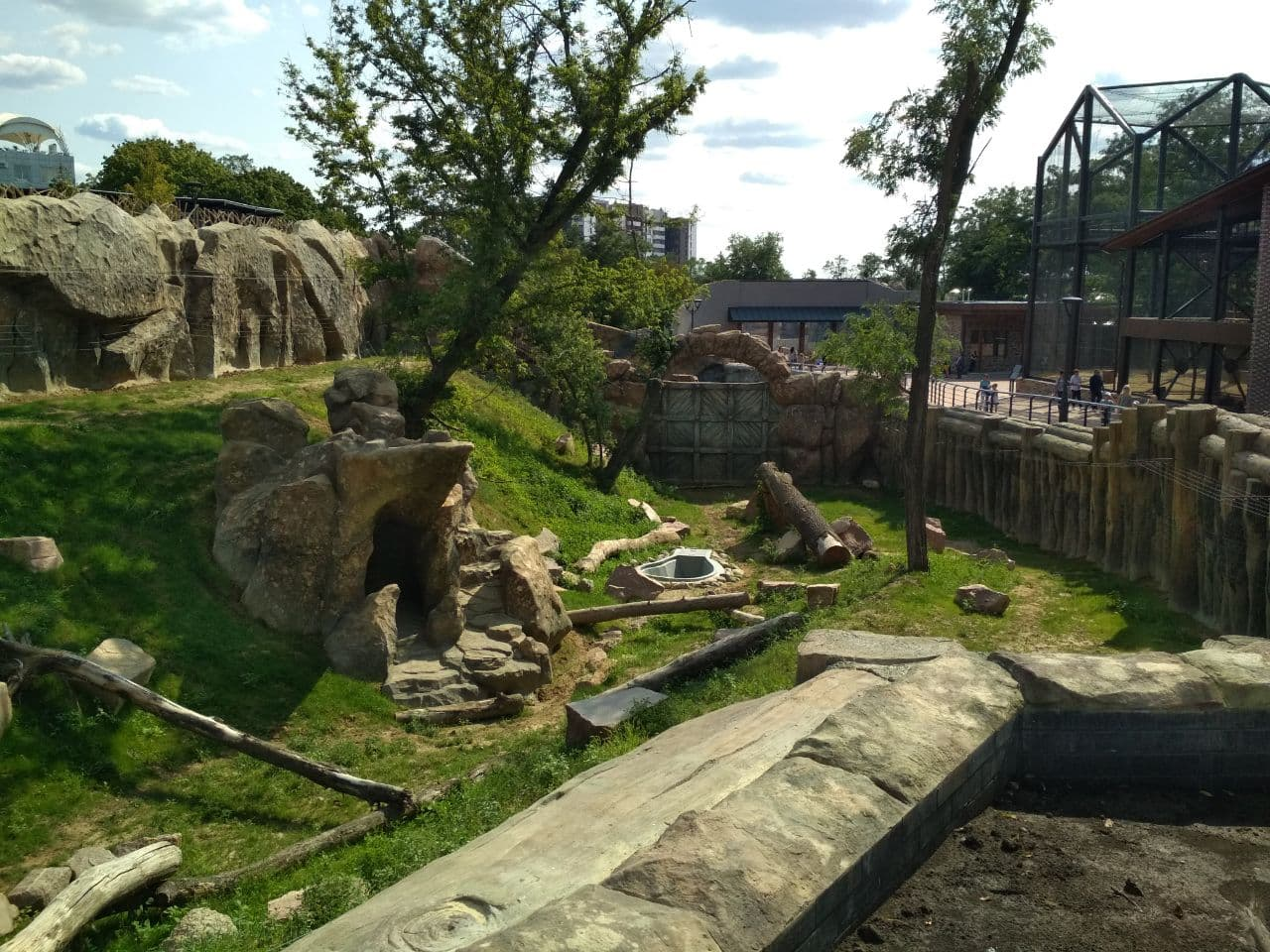
Aviary for predators

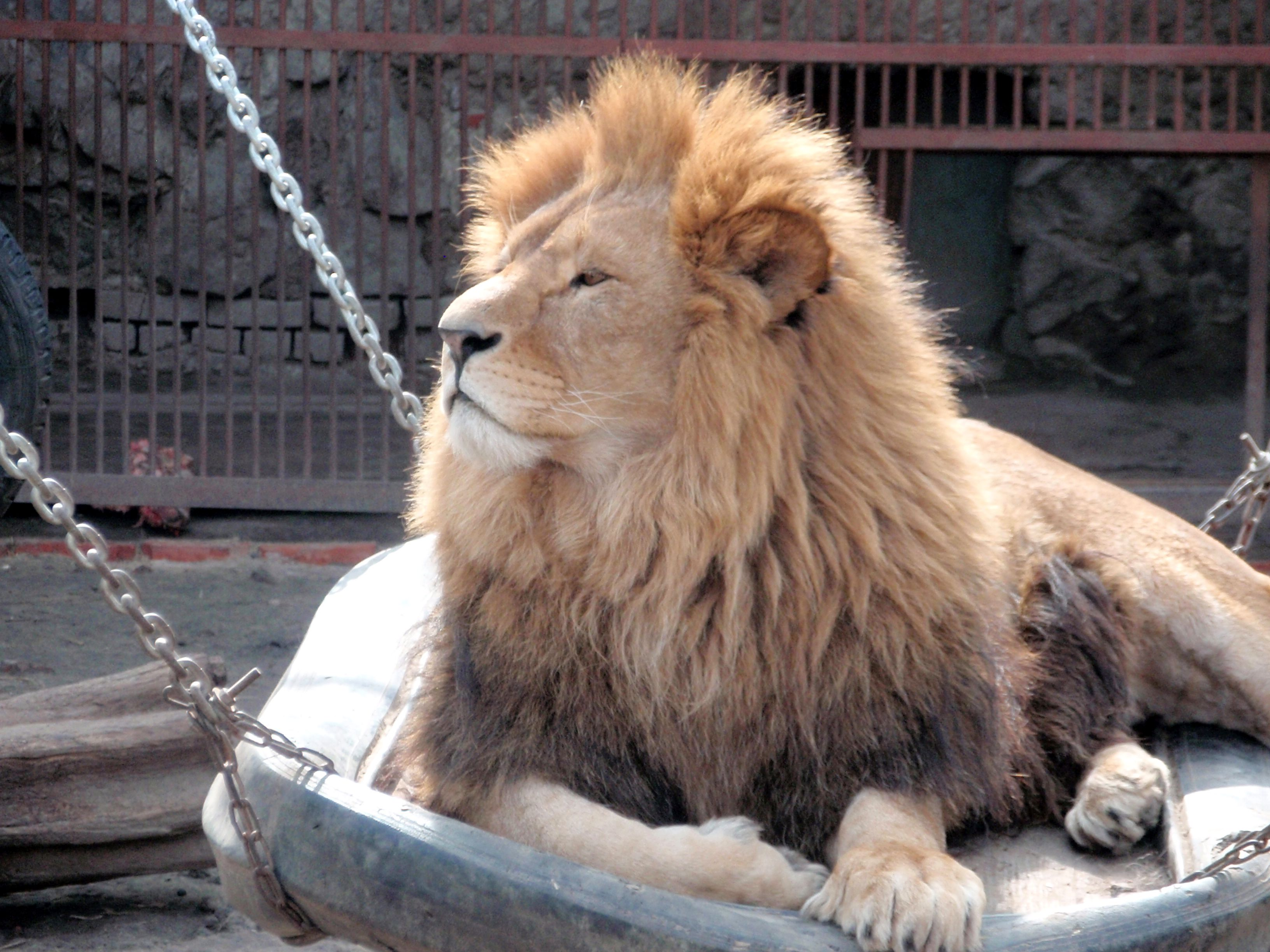
Richard the Lion at the Kharkiv Zoo

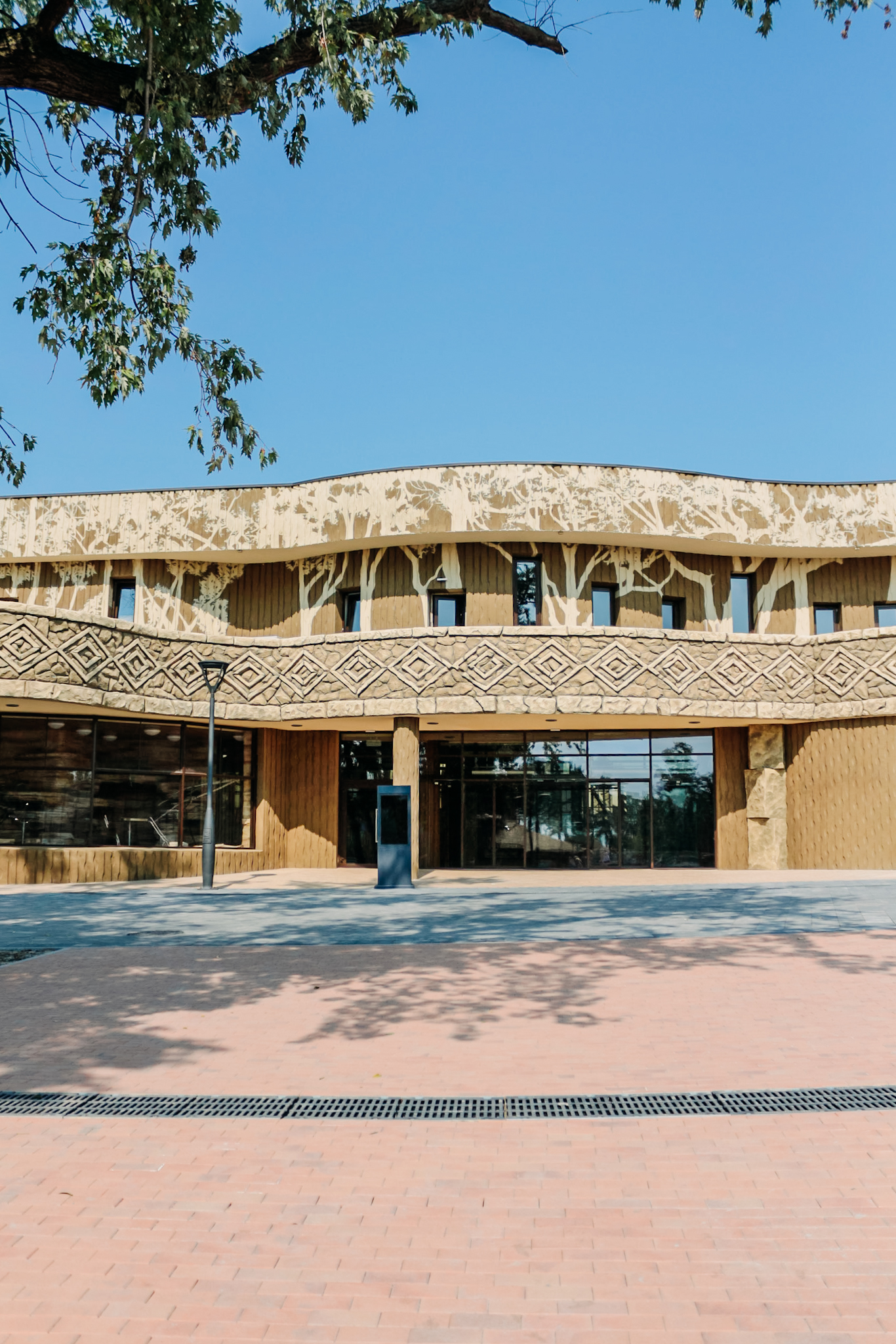
Elephant House

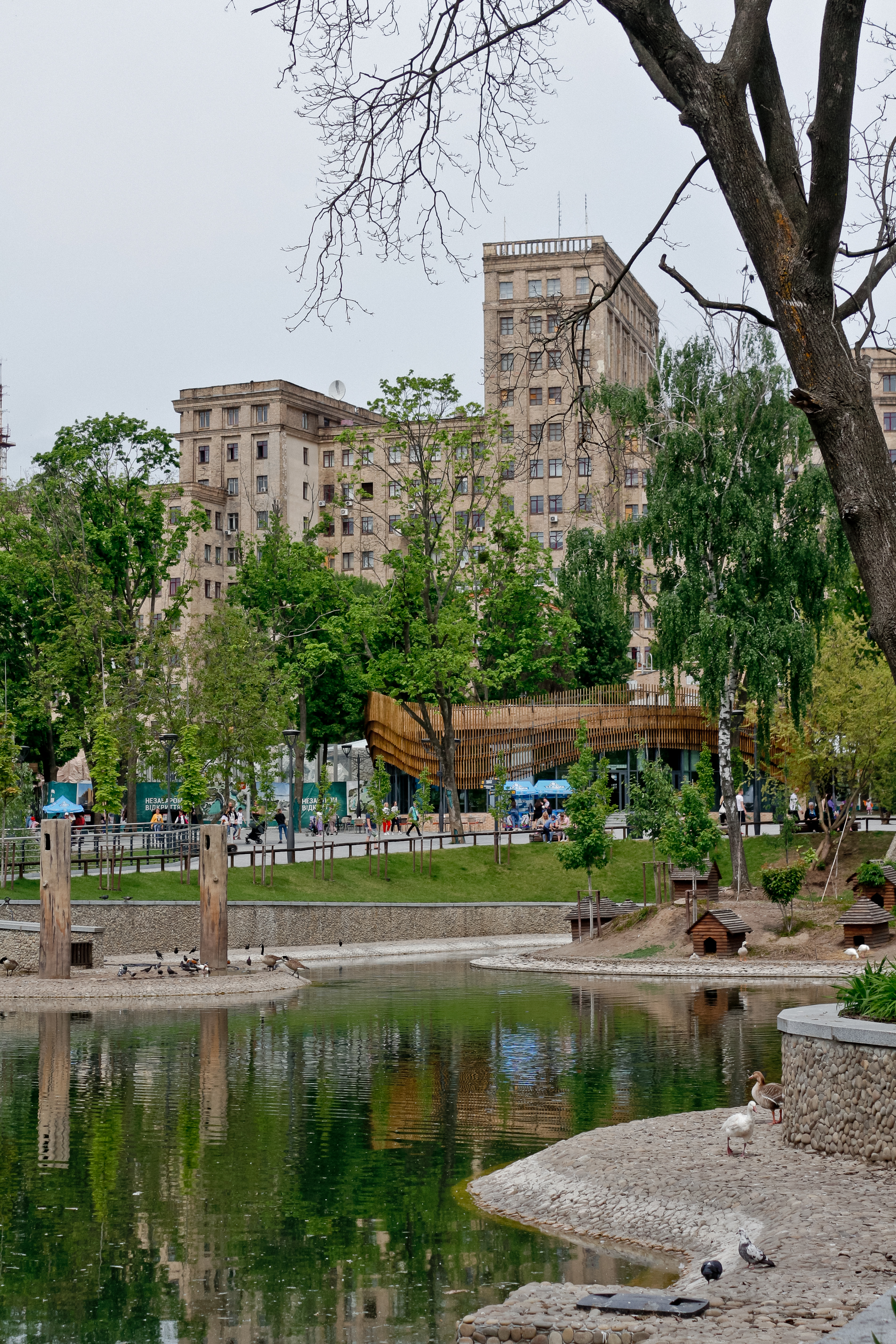
Lake with a view of Karazin University

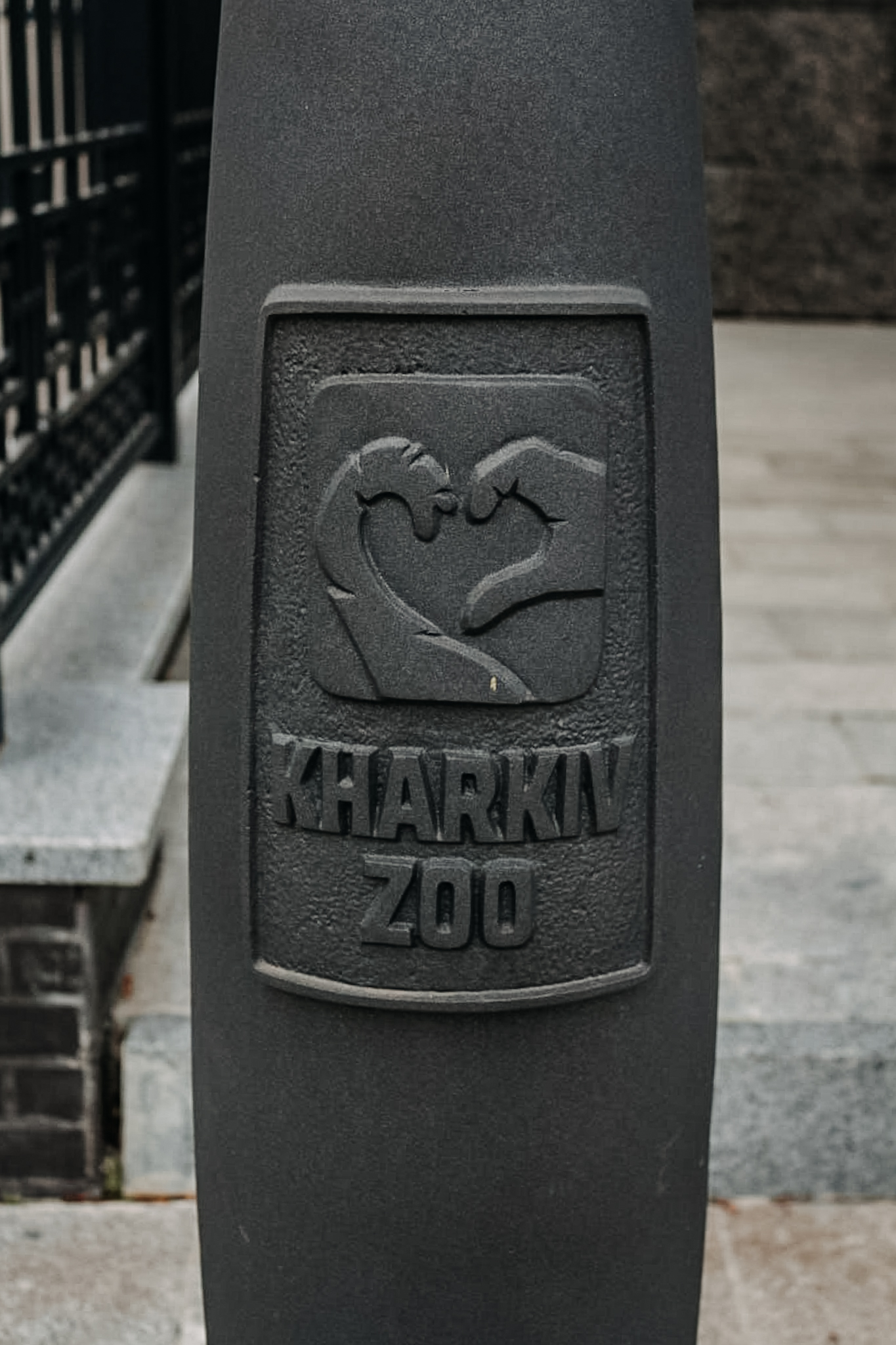
Logo of the zoo on lanterns

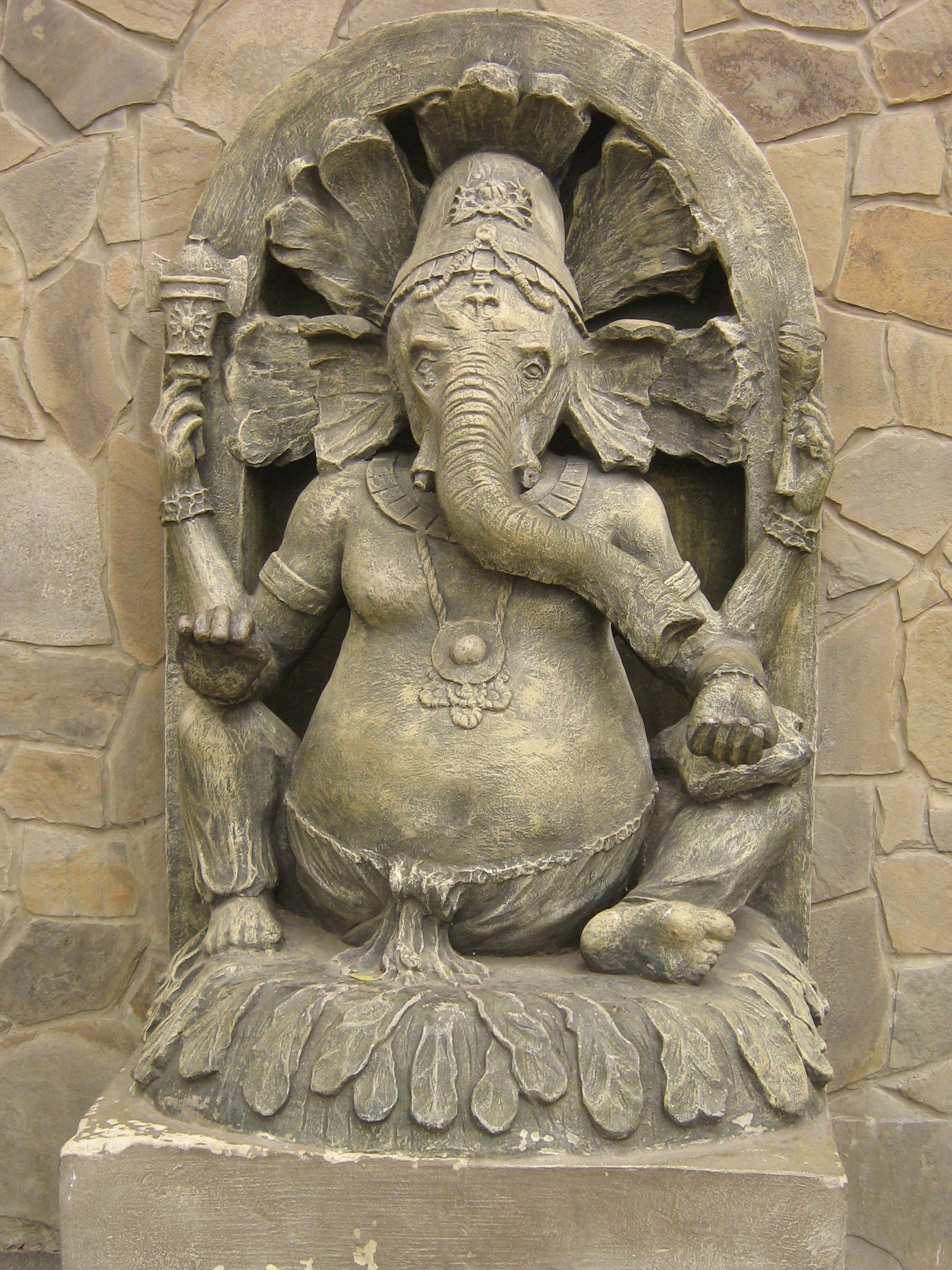
Near the entrance to the elephant house

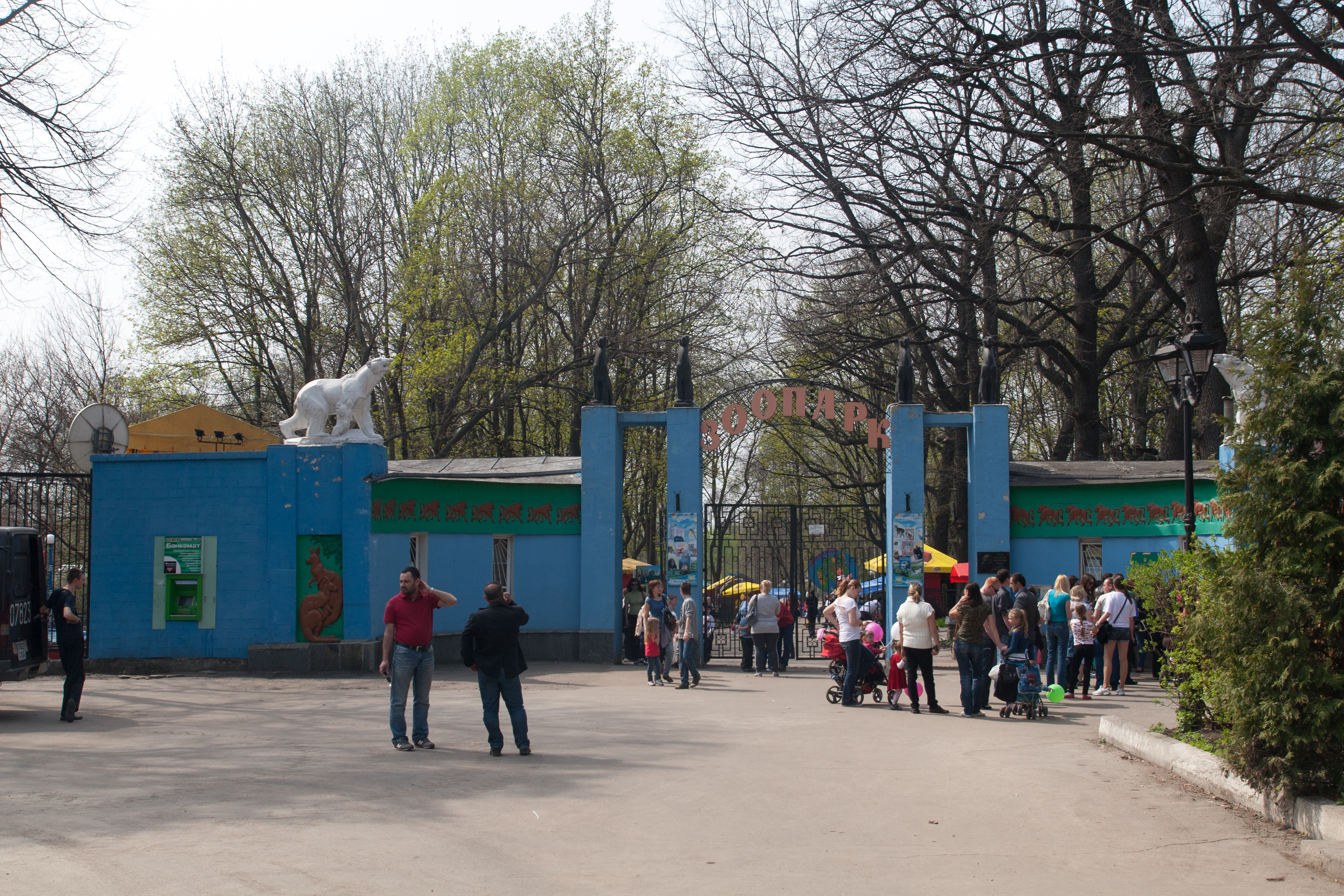
Old entrance to the zoo, 2013

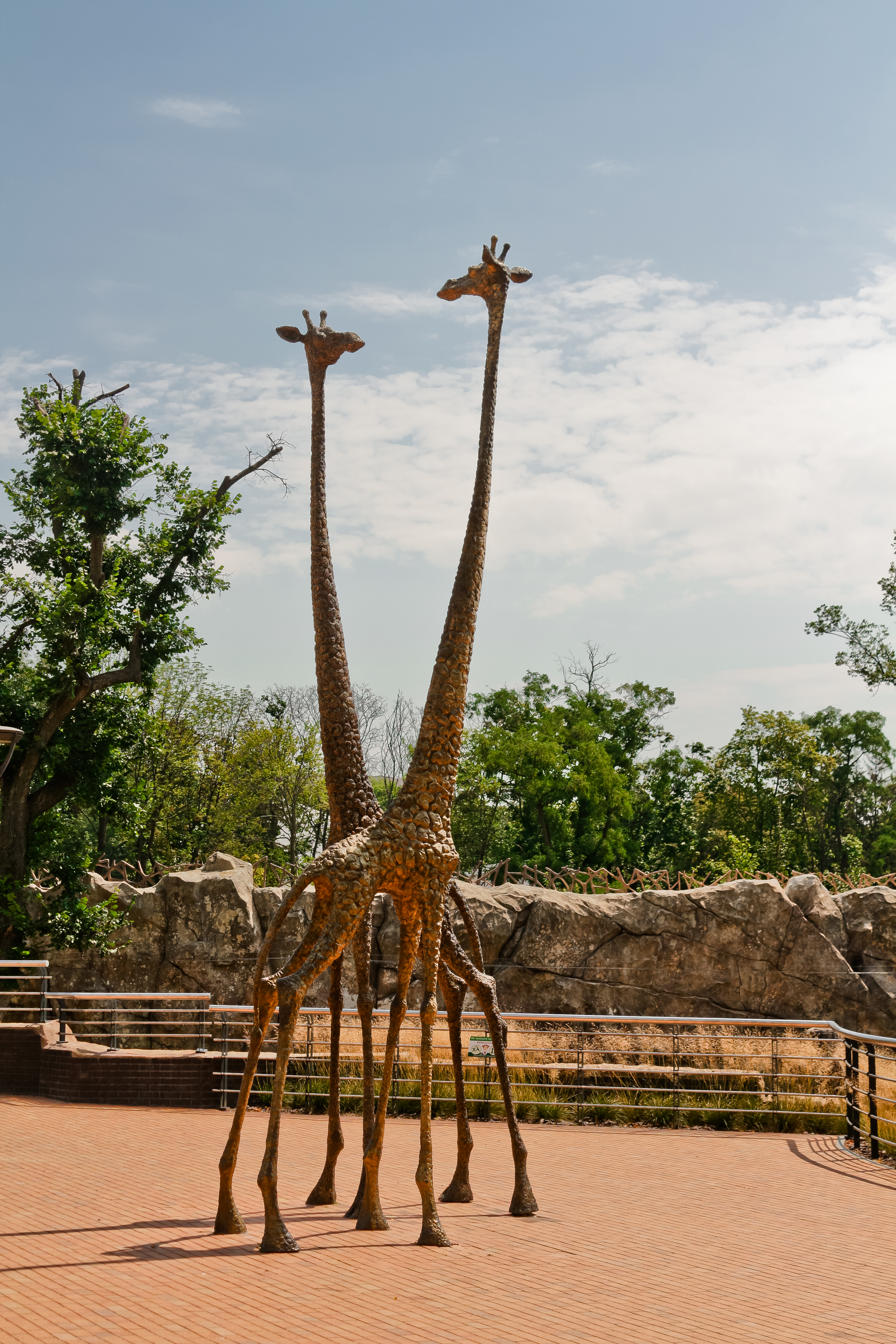
Giraffe Sculptures

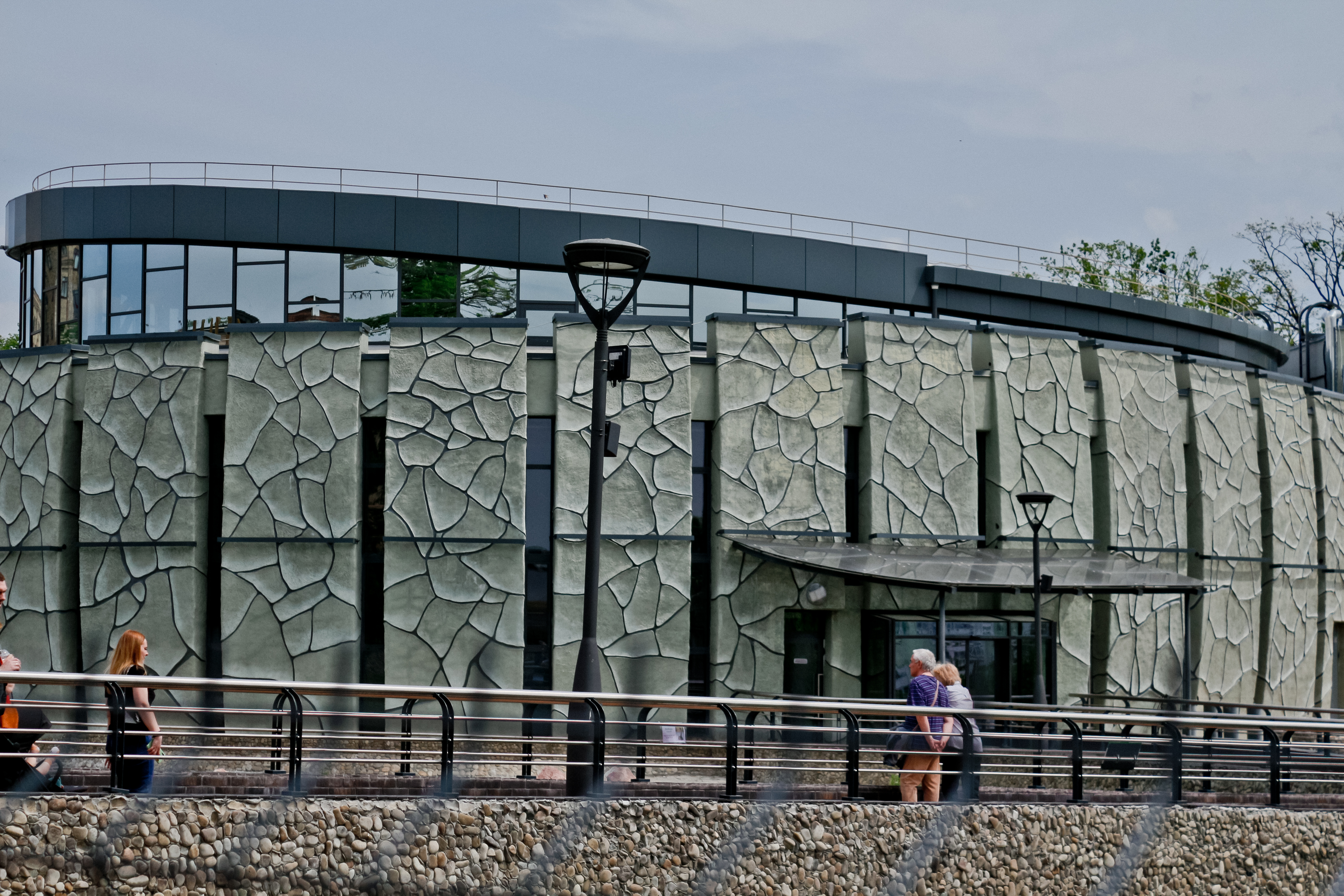
Hippopotamus House

== See also ==
- Feldman Ecopark
- Kyiv Zoo
