= Feldman Ecopark =

Regional landscape park in Lisne, Ukraine

The Feldman Ecopark (Ukrainian: Регіональний ландшафтний парк «Фельдман-Екопарк») in Lisne, Kharkiv Raion is a regional landscape park, which combined animal care and therapy for children with special needs before the 2022 Russian invasion of Ukraine. It is a project of the ICF "Oleksandr Feldman Foundation". The park was originally created in Derhachi Raion, which was later merged into the Kharkiv Raion.

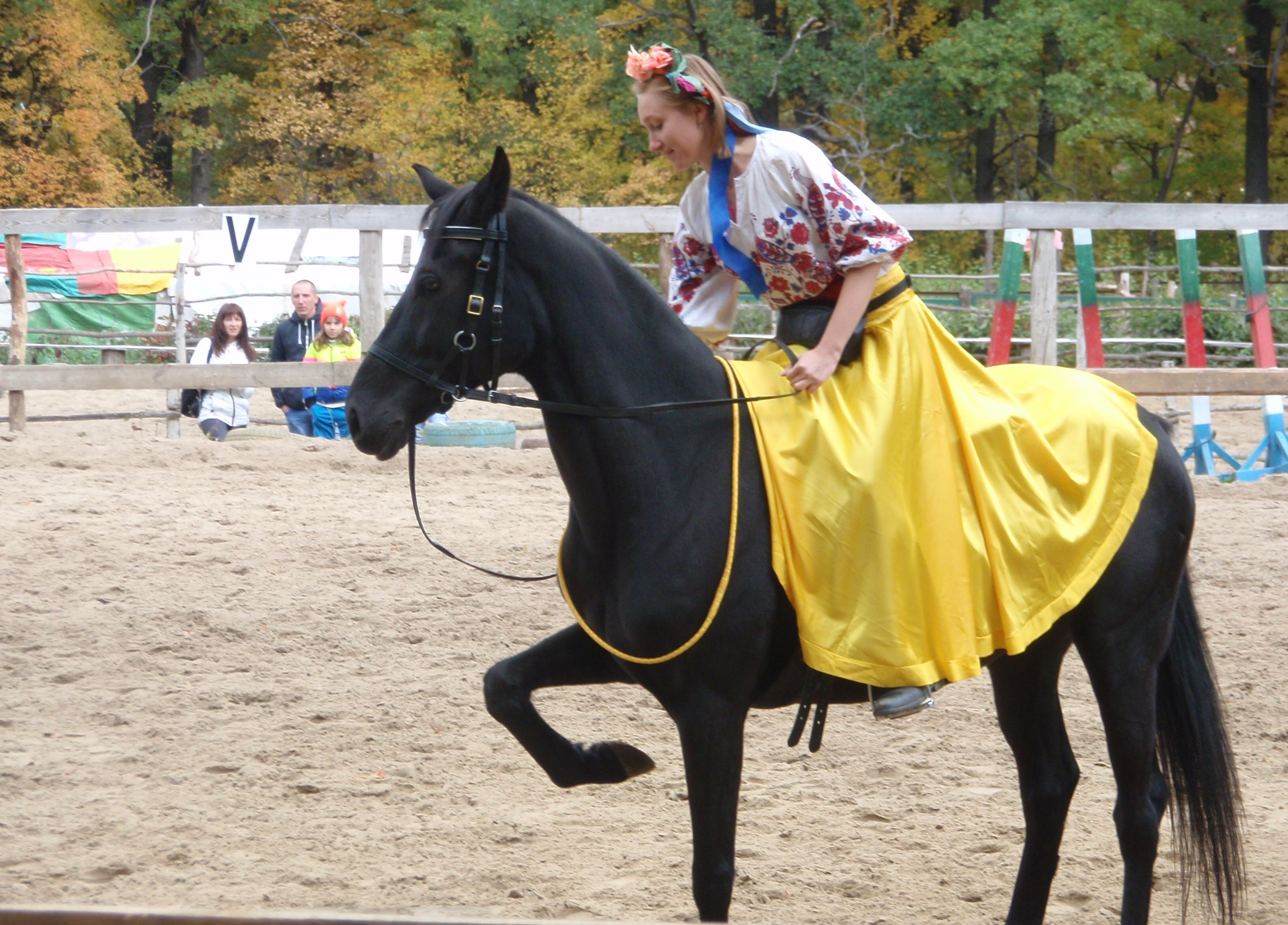
A horse ride show (before the war)

== Russian invasion ==
Feldman Ecopark was largely destroyed during the Russo-Ukrainian war of 2022. During shelling three workers died. Two workers arrived later at the park to feed the animals but were later found shot dead. The Russians stole vegetables intended for animal feed. Two orangutans and one chimpanzee were killed. A couple of bisons were killed by shelling, a ten-month-old one was orphaned. About 6,000 animals were evacuated from the park. A sixth volunteer was killed during the evacuation of African buffaloes.

More than 100 animals died in the park due to further Russian attacks. In July 2024, two employees were injured in a Russian drone strike on the eco-park's territory. In January 2026, a Russian glide bomb destroyed the predators’ winter enclosure and the winter aviary, killing multiple birds and injuring several lions.

== See also ==
- Kharkiv Zoo
