= Kyiv Zoo =

- Kyiv Zoo Logo

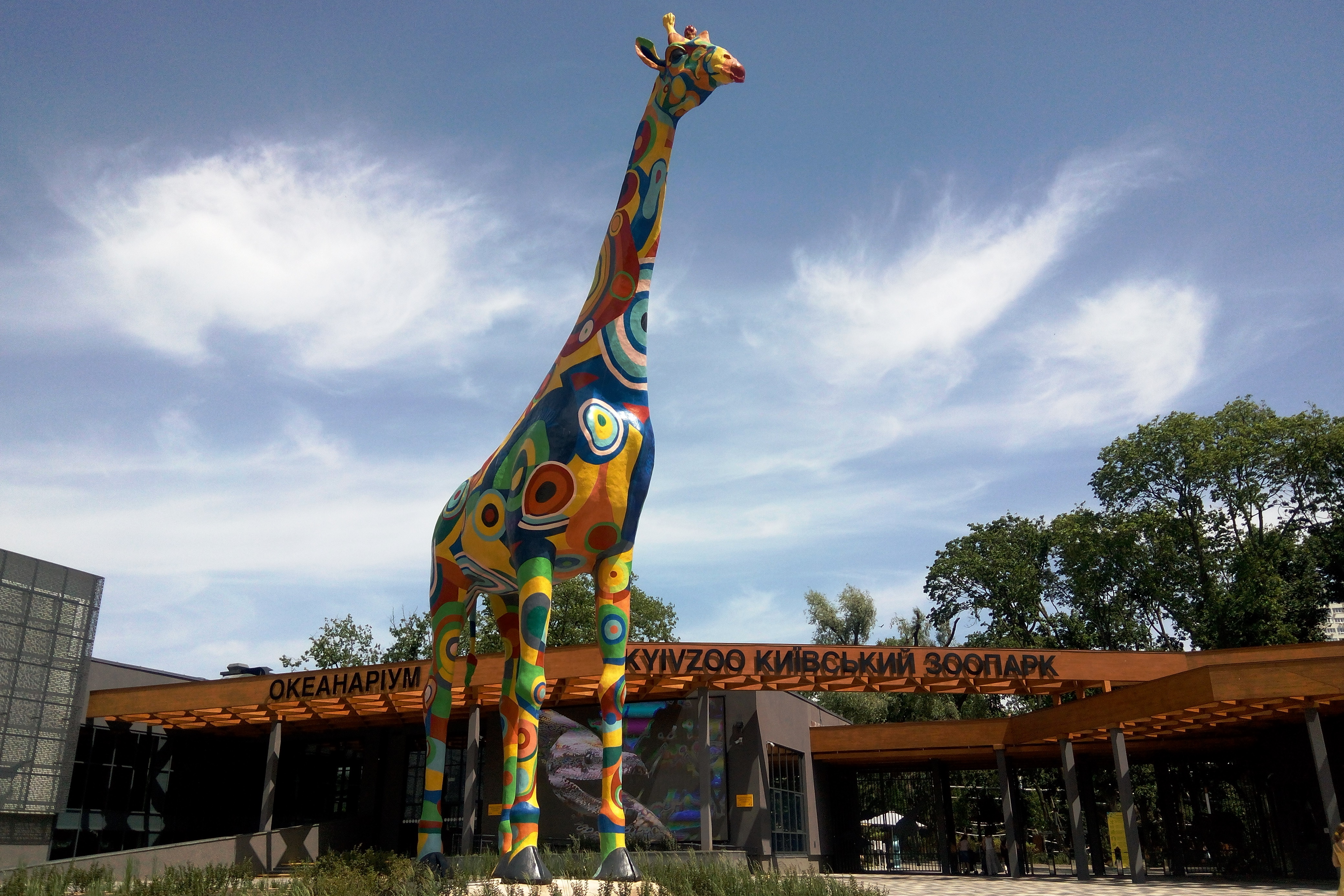
- Kyiv Zoo entry
- Interactive map of Kyiv Zoo
- 50°27′15″N 30°27′46″E
- Date opened: 21 March 1909
- Location: Kyiv, Ukraine
- Land area: 40 ha (99 acres)
- No. of animals: 1947 (1 January 2010)
- No. of species: 339 (1 January 2010)
- Website: zoo.kyiv.ua

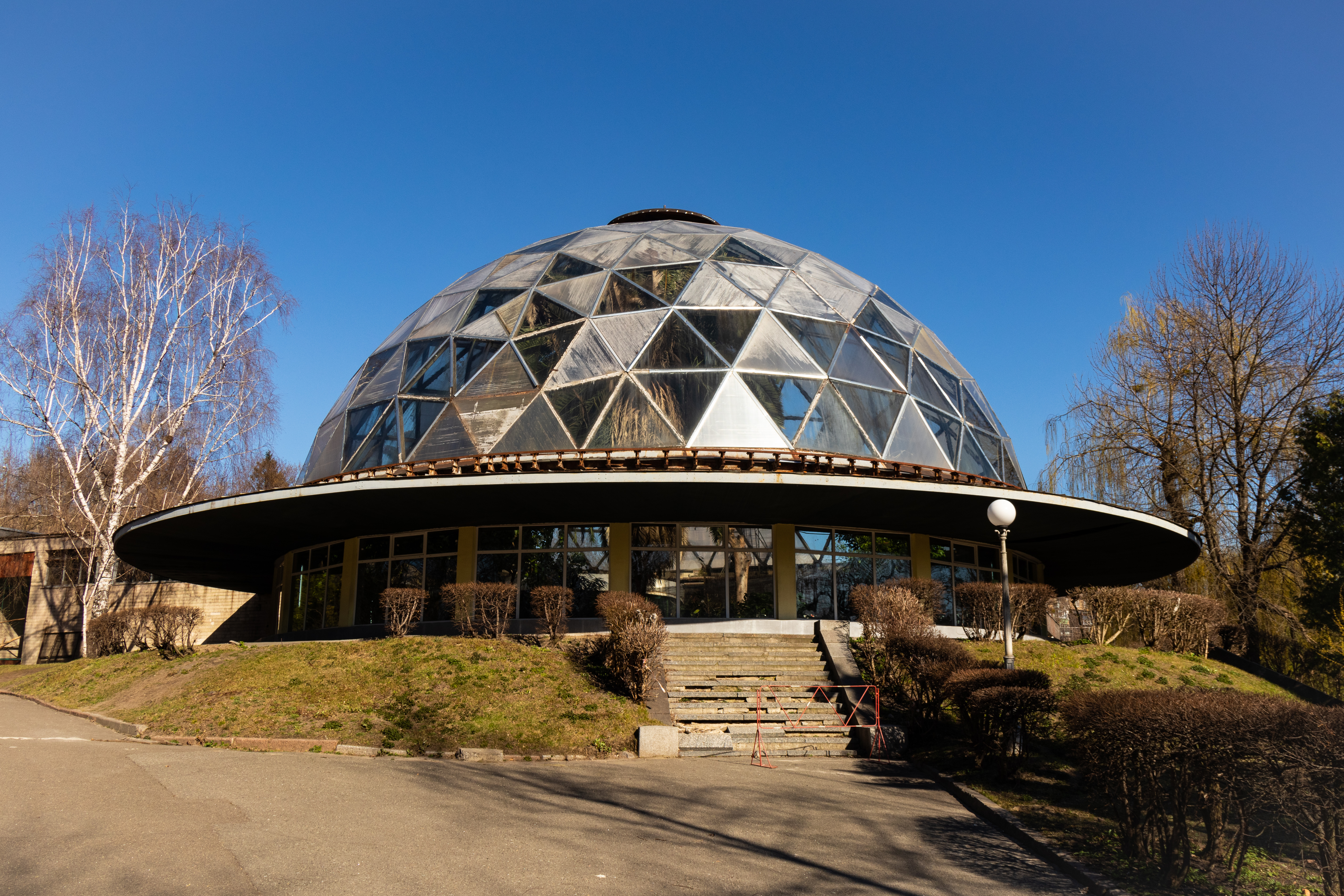
Birds of all breeds stay in the aviary during winter months

The Kyiv Zoo (Ukrainian: Київський Зоопарк, romanized: Kyivskyi Zoopark, IPA: [ˈkɪjiu̯sʲkɪj zooˈpɑrk]) is the largest zoo in Kyiv, Ukraine, and one of the largest in the former Soviet Union. Situated on about 40 hectares (99 acres), the zoo is cared for by 378 staff members and receives about 280,000 visitors annually.

== History ==
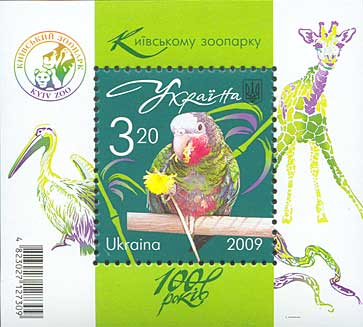
Ukrainian postage stamp marking the 100th anniversary of the founding of Kyiv Zoo

The Kyiv Zoo was founded in 1909 by the Nature Lovers Society, and was financed by various private donors and philanthropic efforts. During the early 20th century, after experiencing some initial setbacks and difficulties, the zoo limited its total number of animals to no more than 15–20 species at one time. During their first winter season, many of the zoo's temperate, tropical and semi-tropical species had to be transferred to the food-storage area of the main Kyiv-Pasazhyrskyi railway station, as the zoo's founders and directors had not secured adequate overwintering facilities for all of their animals. Eventually, a suitable shelter was created at the A.V. Fomin Botanical Garden. As the Kyiv Zoo began to prosper, its number of animals being looked after increased, further limiting the available space. It was reported that occasional loose or escapee animals had frightened the employees of the garden.

Four years after it was founded, a relatively large, permanent location on the outskirts of Kyiv was allotted to the zoo. In 1913, the animals' winter facilities received central heating.

By 1914, as political instability in Imperial Russia had increased, the development of the zoo was limited. Only after the Russian Revolution (1917) ended did the zoo recover. During the 1940s (World War II), Kyiv was occupied by the Nazi German forces, and the zoo was used by the German garrison. Fortunately, the animals were evacuated out of the city, and later returned after the end of the war.

In 1970, the bird's pavilion was added, which is considered to be the largest in Europe to-date. In 1982, an exhibit called Animals Island was presented, in which animals were separated from the visitors by small canals. The Animals Island houses the zoo's large cats (like lions and tigers).

In 1996, the zoo was admitted to the European Association of Zoos and Aquaria (EAZA); however, it was expelled and banned in 2017 over poor conditions, and of mistreatment of animals. As of April 2018, the zoo is a "Candidate for Membership" with EAZA, and as such is being supported towards resuming full membership.

In 2008, some 51 animals died in the zoo. A series of controversial deaths also unfolded in 2010, when a 39-year-old elephant died at Kyiv Zoo on 26 April, followed by a camel on 26 May, and a bison on 31 May. The city administration and the zoo authorities blamed poisoning of the animals as cause of the deaths, while animal rights activists accused the substandard living conditions, negligent handling and unqualified zoo administration.

In 2009, a Ukrainian postage stamp was introduced to mark the 100th anniversary of the zoo. In 2020, the zoo received a full renovation to improve the life of the animals in it.

External videos
- Bunker in a Birdhouse: Kyiv Zoo Prepares for War – March 2022 – Washington Post

In response to concerns over the Russian military presence at the border, zoo director Kyrylo Trantin, began to prepare for the possibility of invasion about a week before it began. Trantin, with the advice of a zoo director in Haifa, Israel, stocked up on food supplies and materials to build additional enclosures or to repair existing ones. The zoo closed down for an indefinite amount of time following the 2022 Russian invasion of Ukraine. Zookeepers said they were still keeping care of the animals inside, with about 50 staff members and about 30 family members living within the facility to care for the animals.

== Description ==
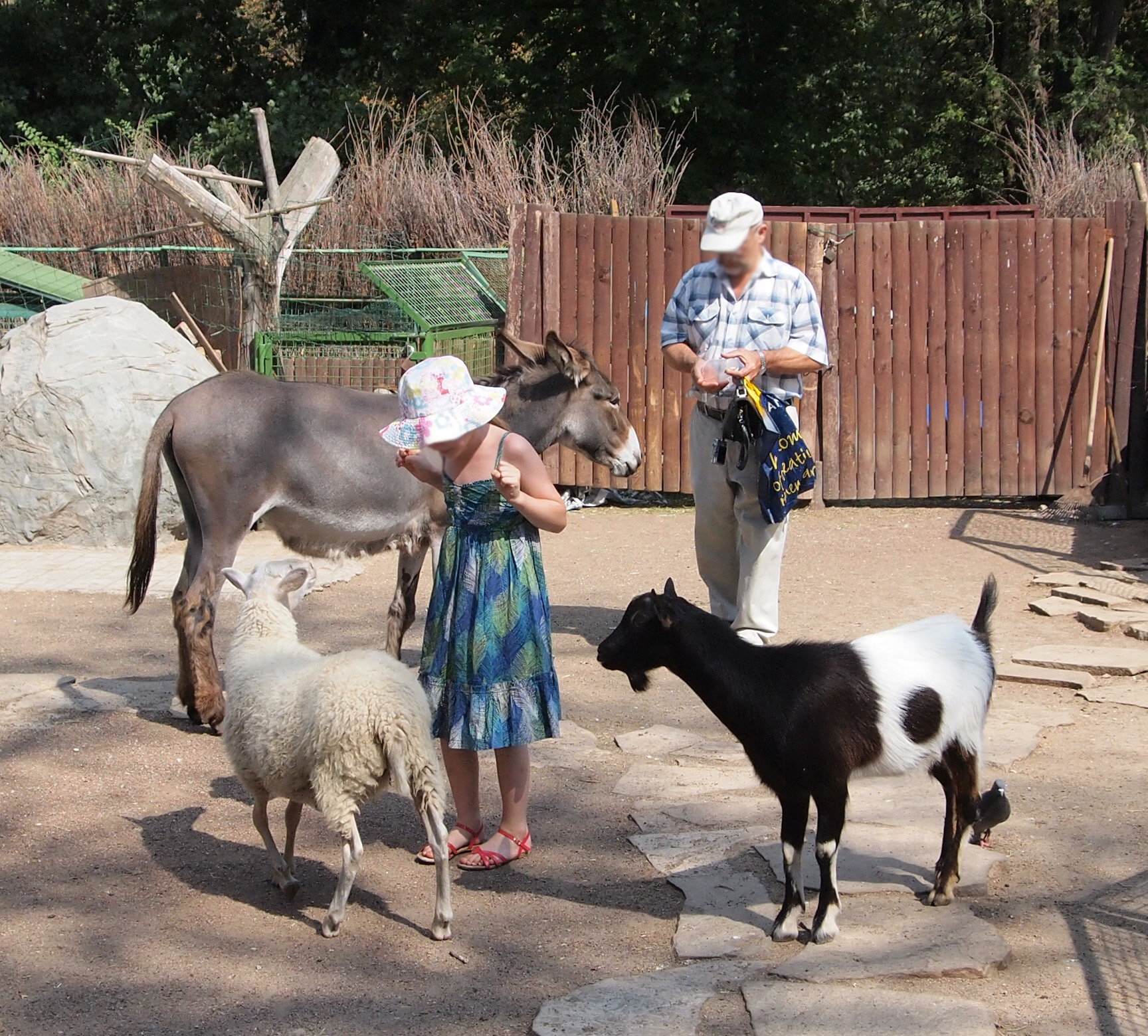
Domestic animals in Kyiv Zoo

The zoo occupies a territory of 40 hectares (99 acres). According to CBC, the zoo has 2,600 animals from 328 species, including a pair of elephants. 130 different kinds of trees and bushes decorate the zoo's islands.

The zoo is also a research centre, working on acclimatization of far land animals, and preserving and reproduction of rare animals, such as the Amur tigers, bisons, Przewalski's Horses and some others. The zoo has since been refurbished since 2017.

Species as of 31 December 2009
| Group | #Species | #Specimens |
|---|---|---|
| Birds | 98 | 593 |
| Mammals | 59 | 192 |
| Reptiles | 49 | 135 |
| Amphibians | 21 | 135 |
| Fish | 58 | 530 |
| Invertebrates | 54 | 362 |
| Total: | 339 | 1947 |

== Gallery ==
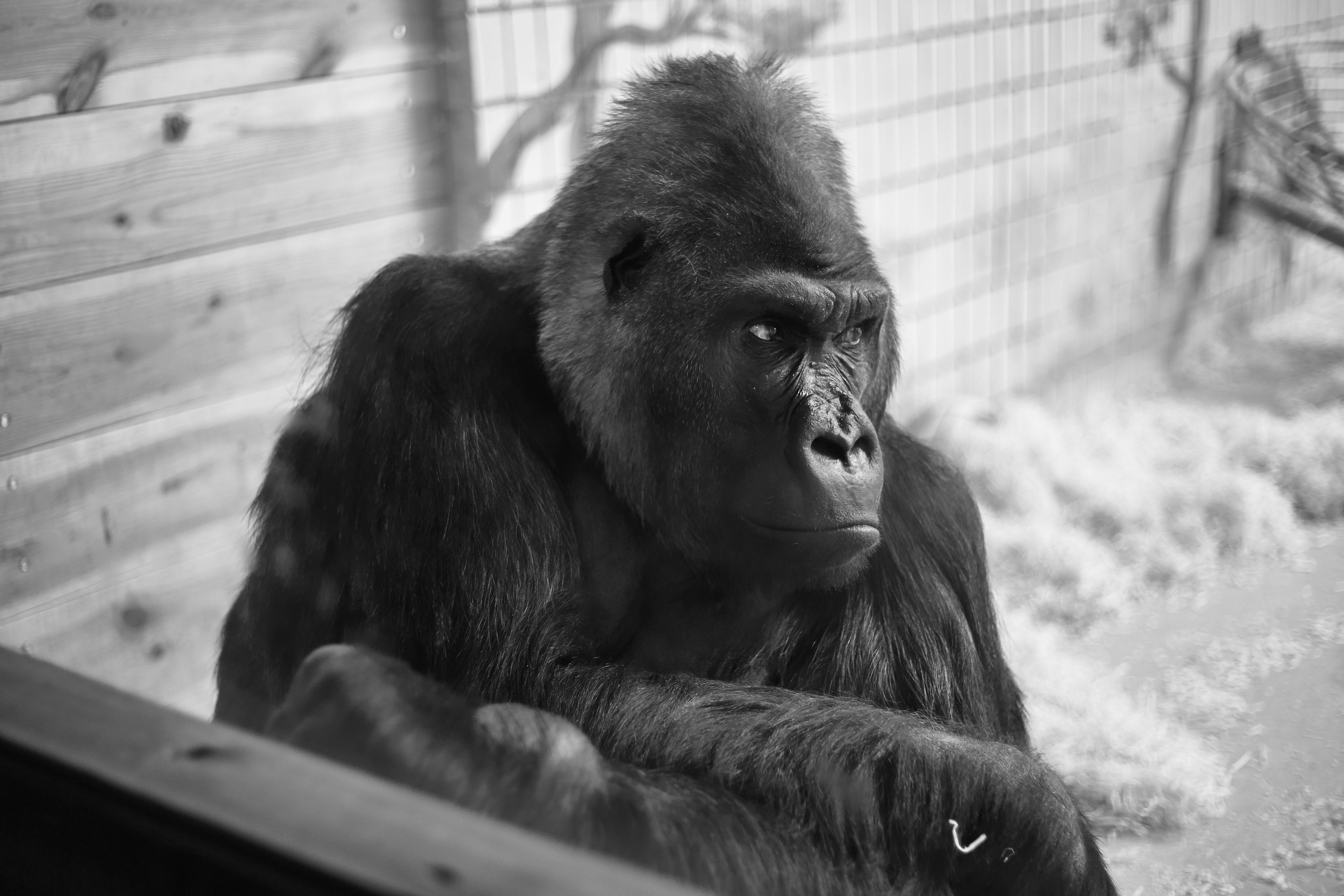
Western gorilla

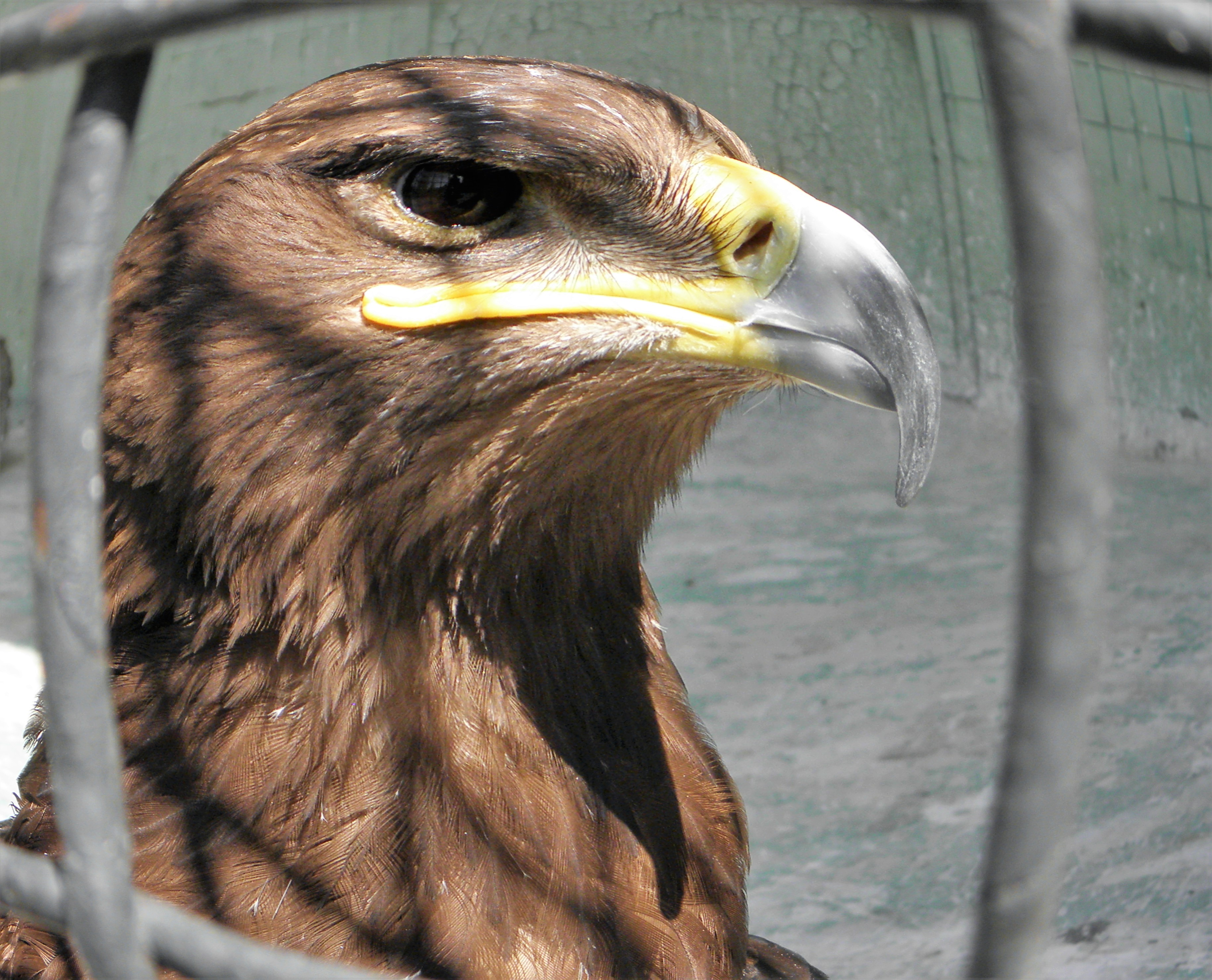
Steppe eagle

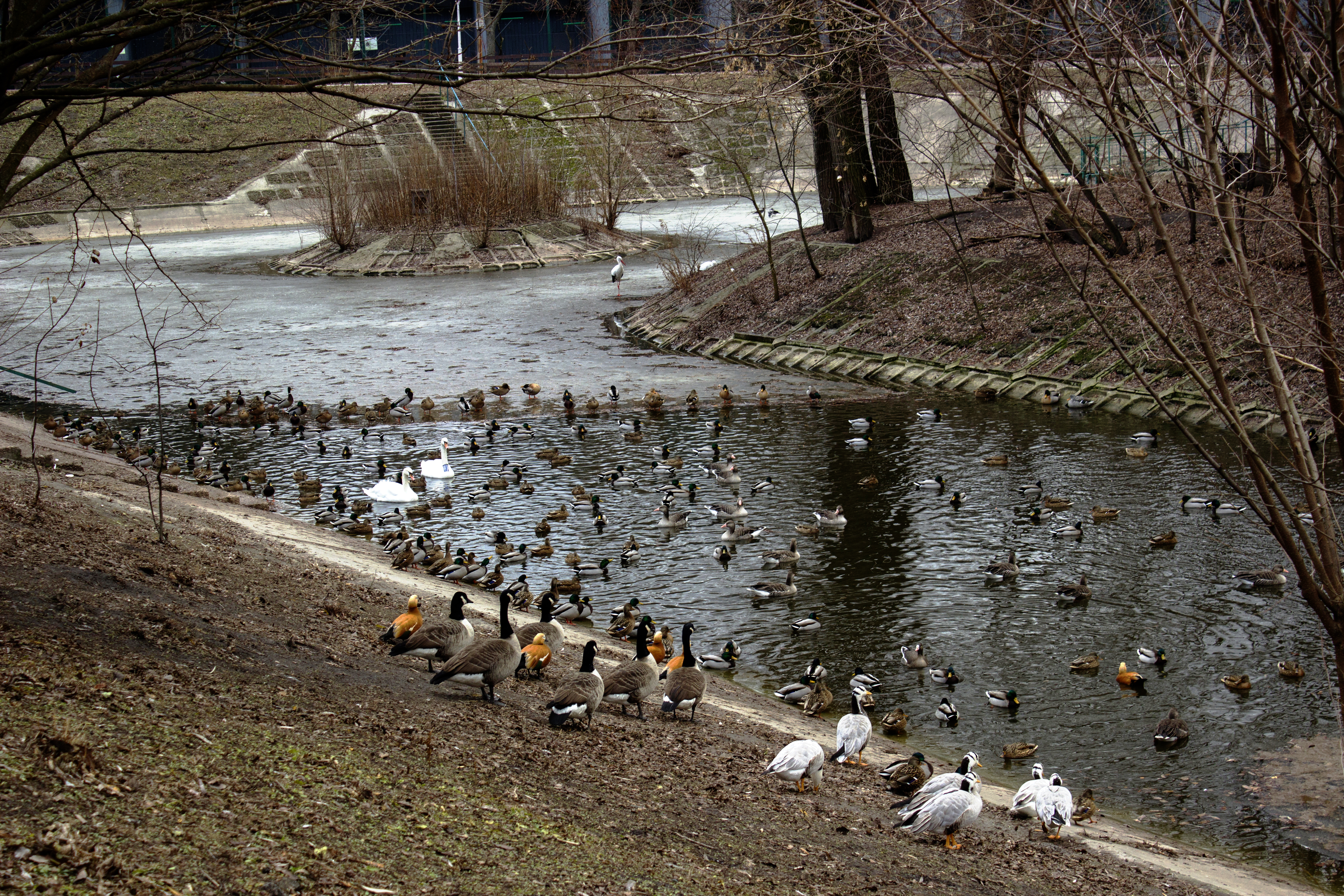
Bird pond

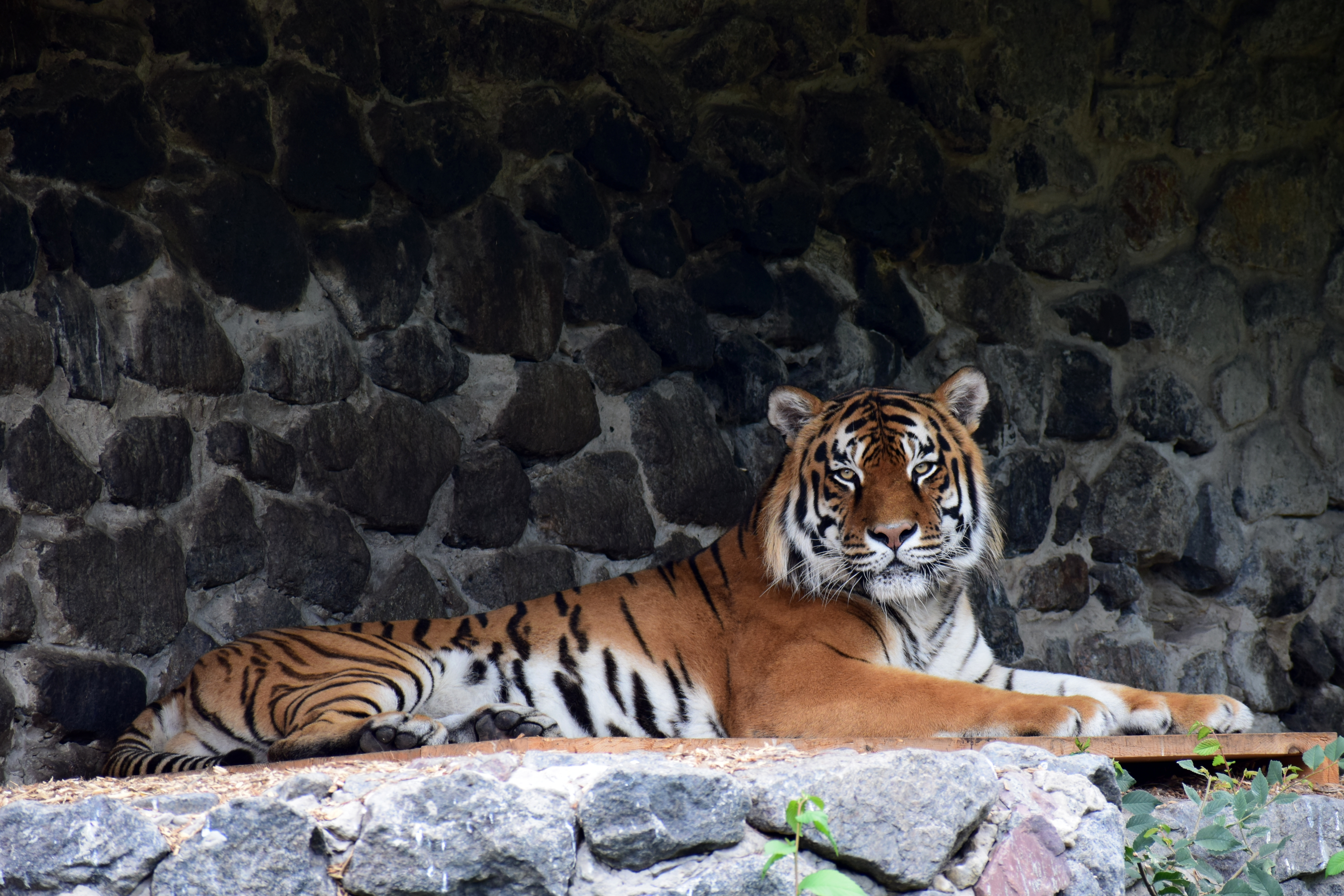
The Siberian tiger

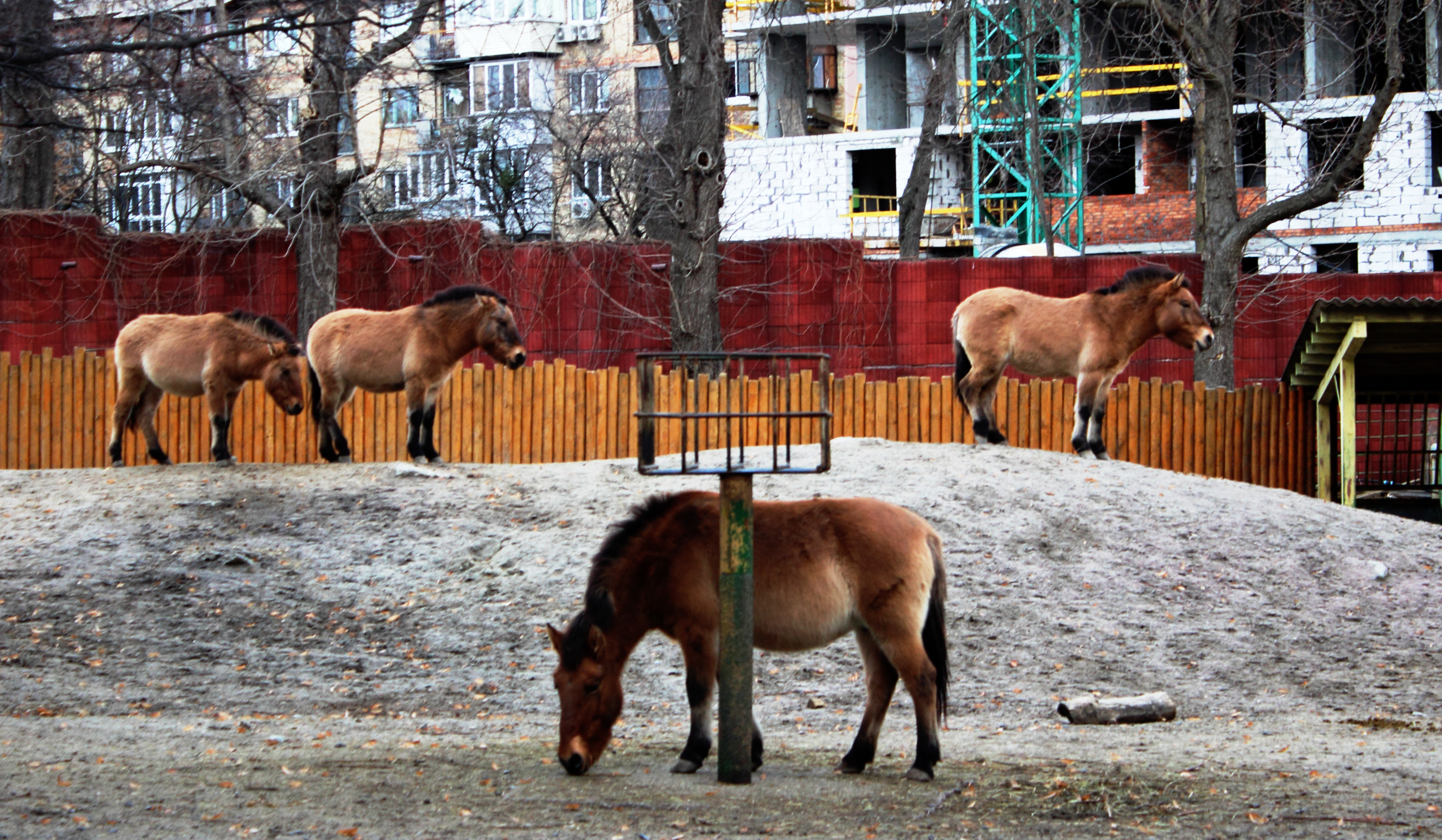
Przewalski's horse

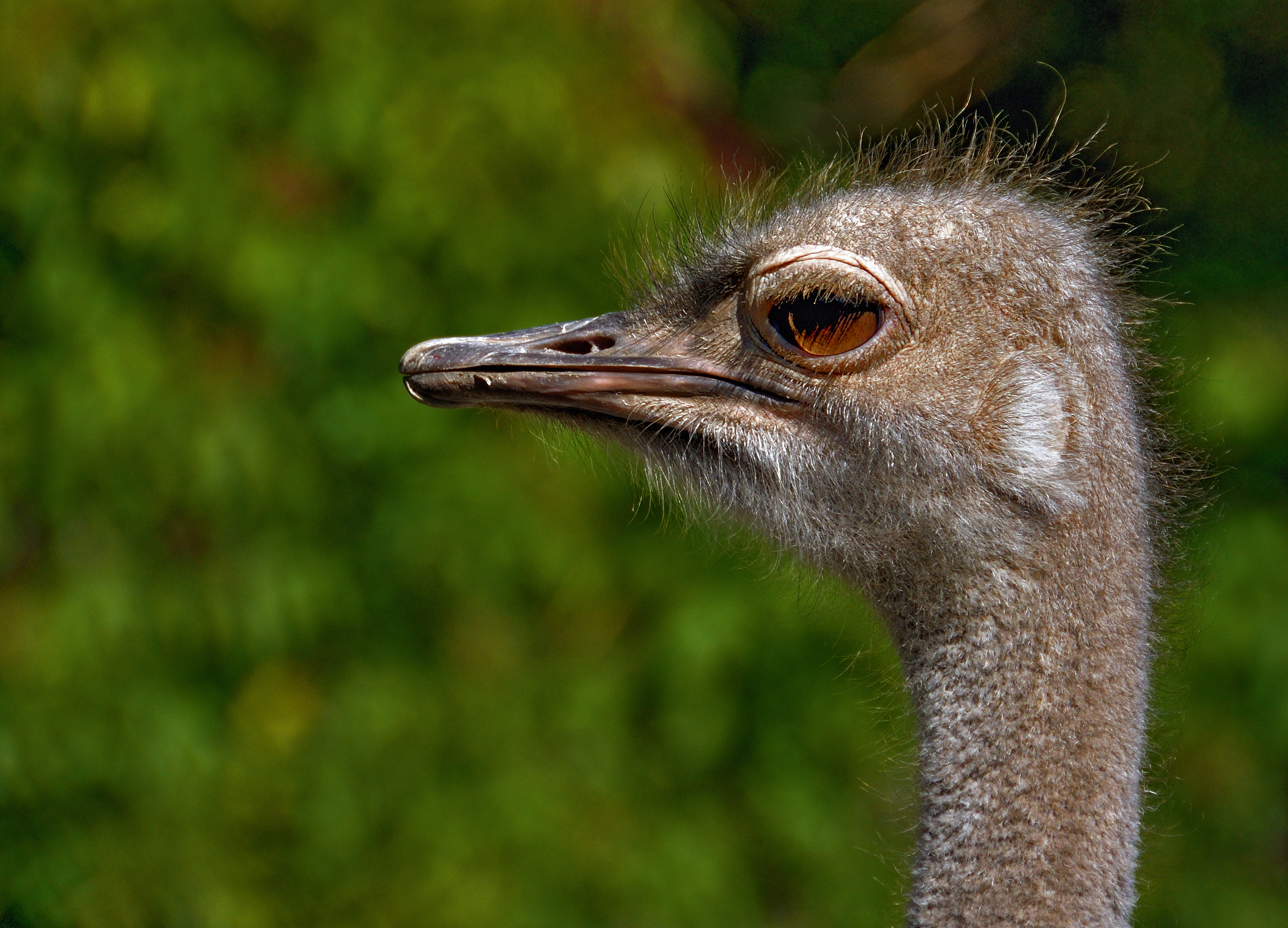
The common ostrich

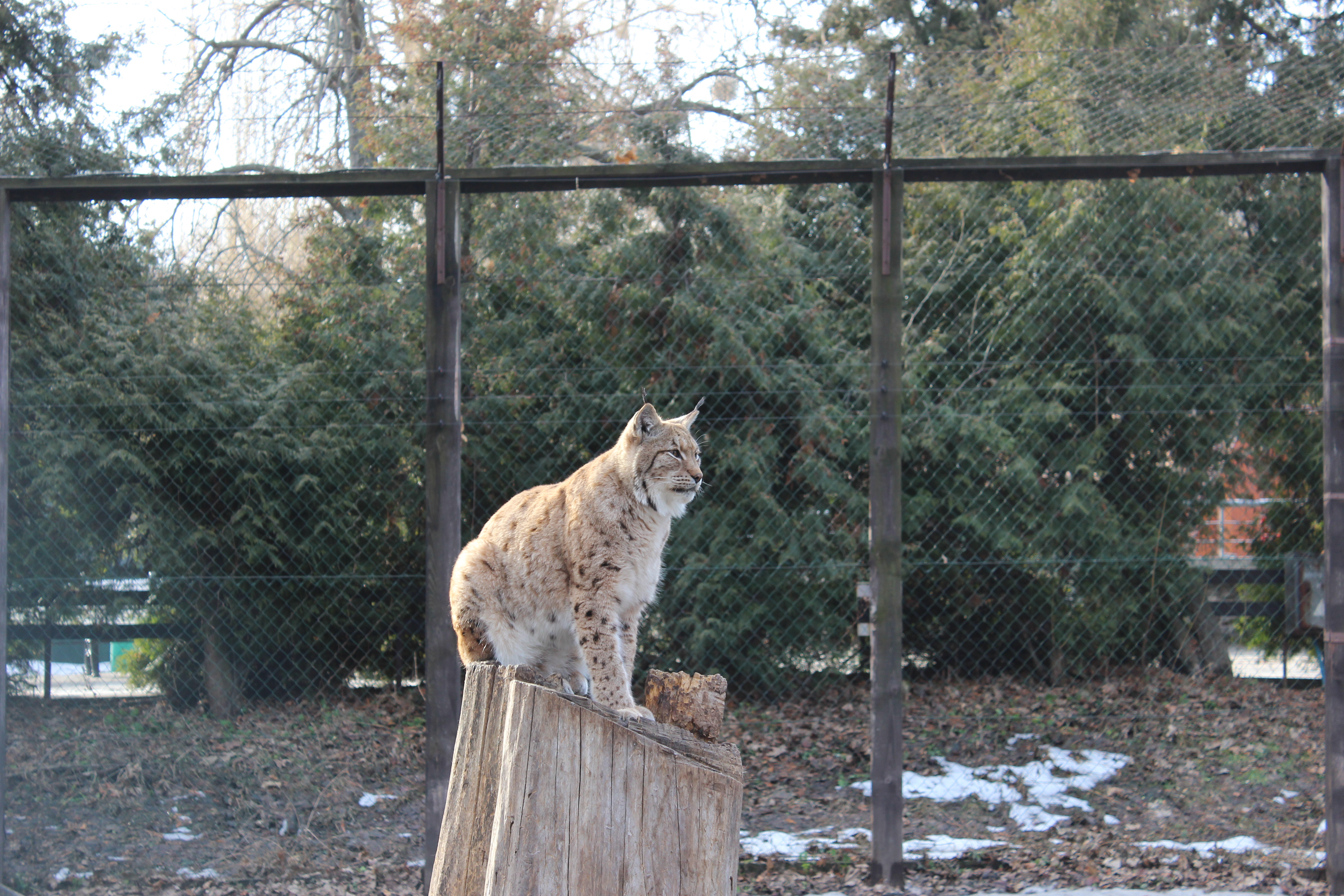
The Eurasian lynx

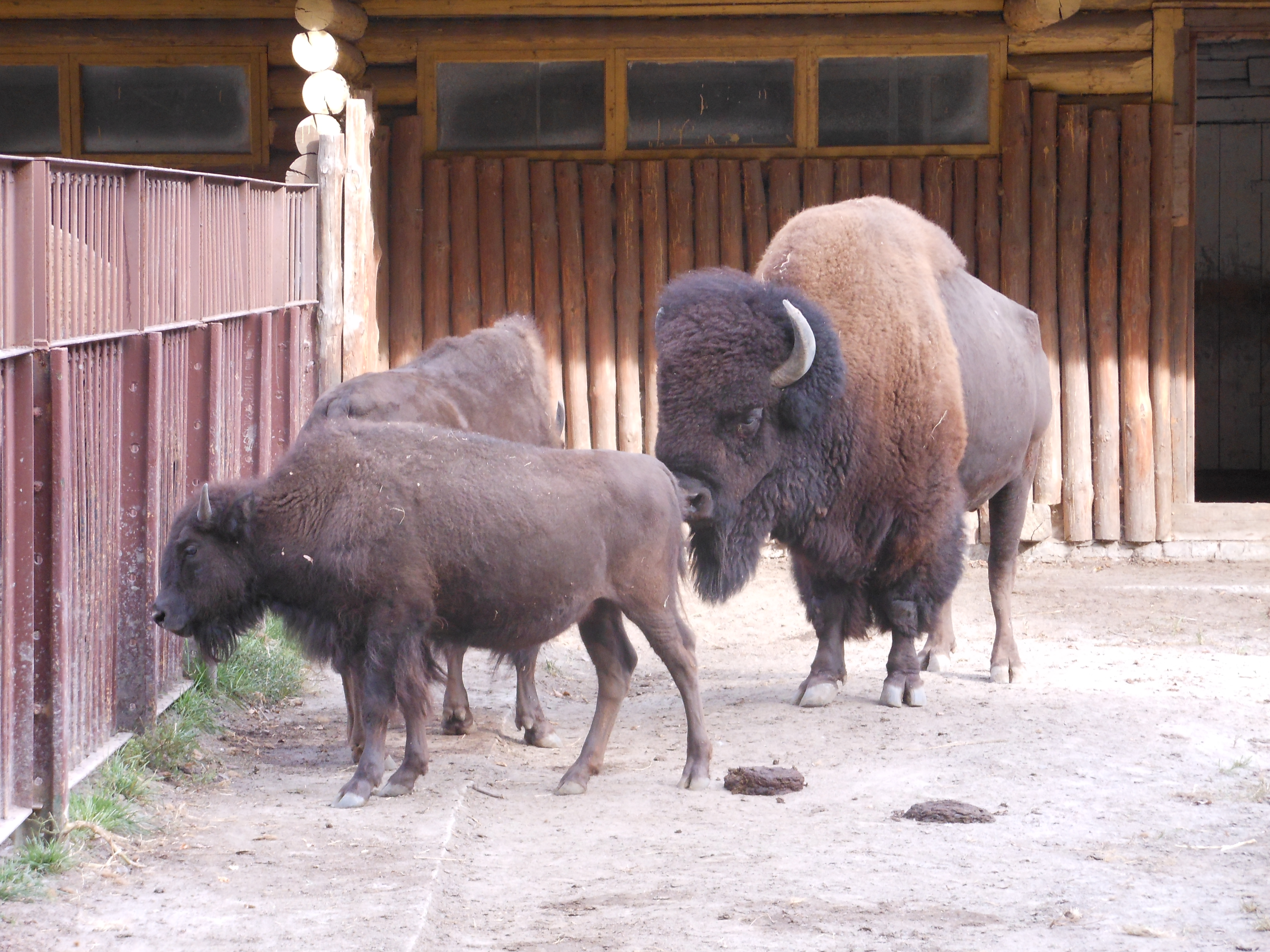
The European bison

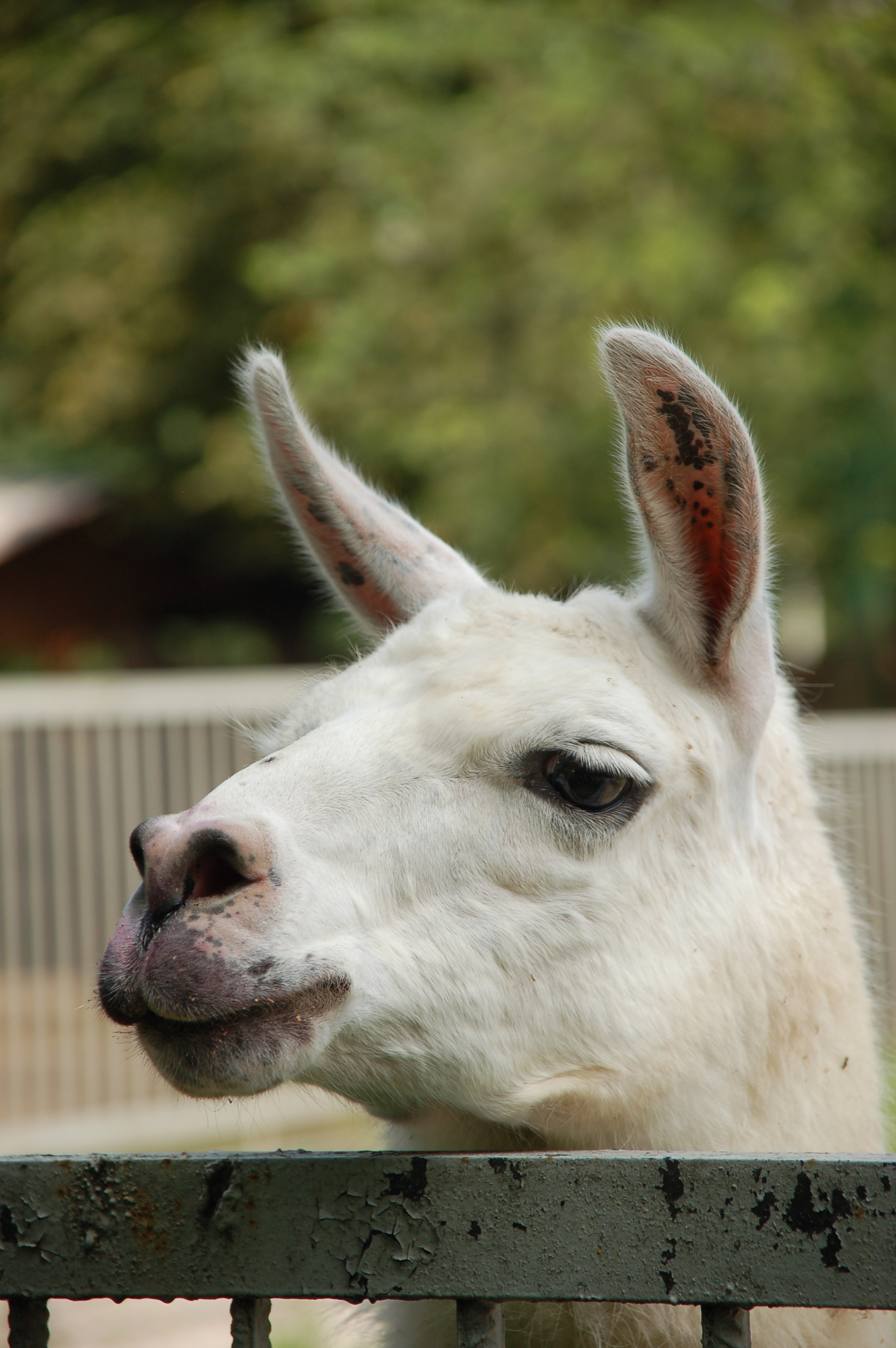
The llama

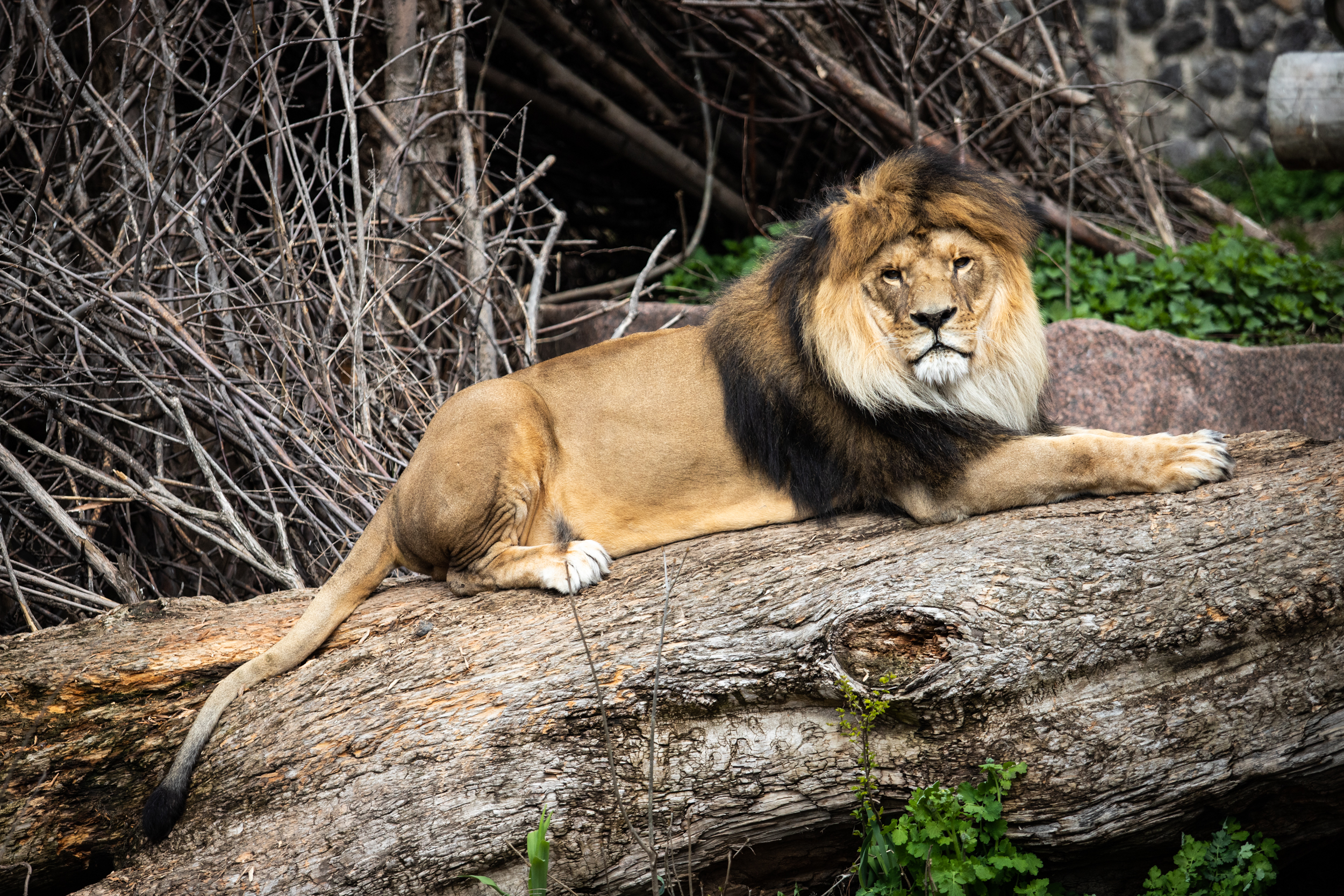
The lion

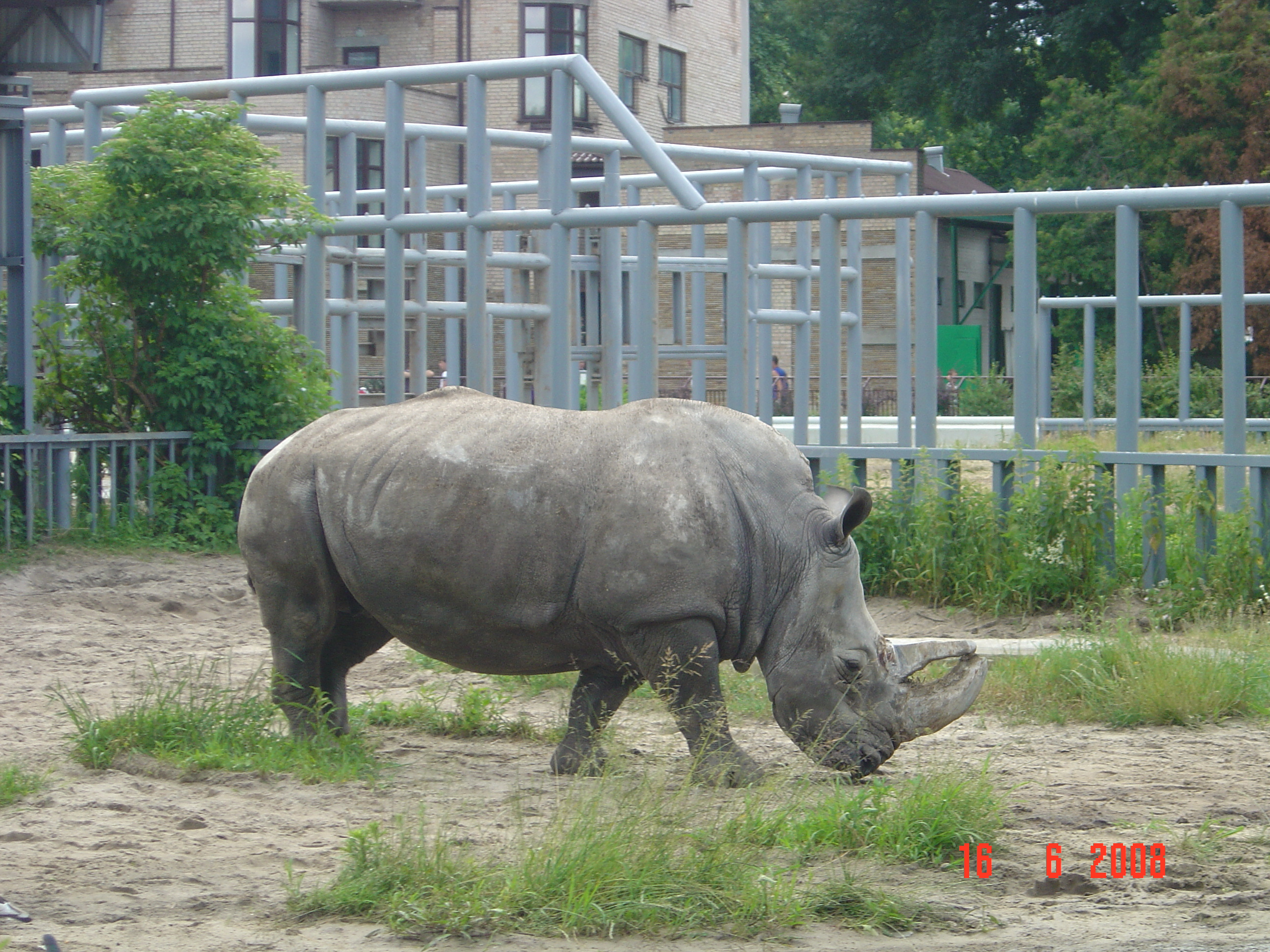
The white rhinoceros or square-lipped rhinoceros

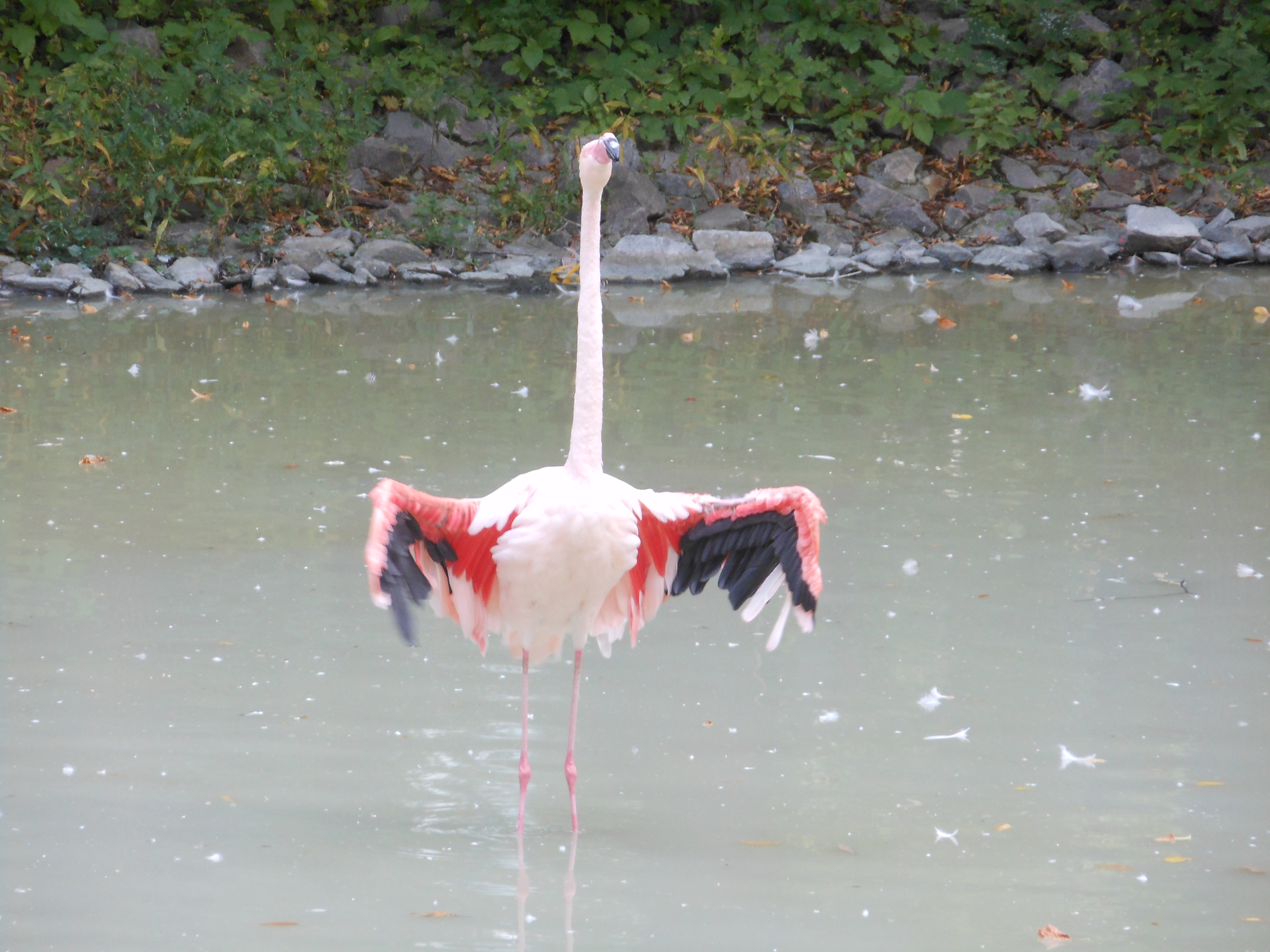
The greater flamingo

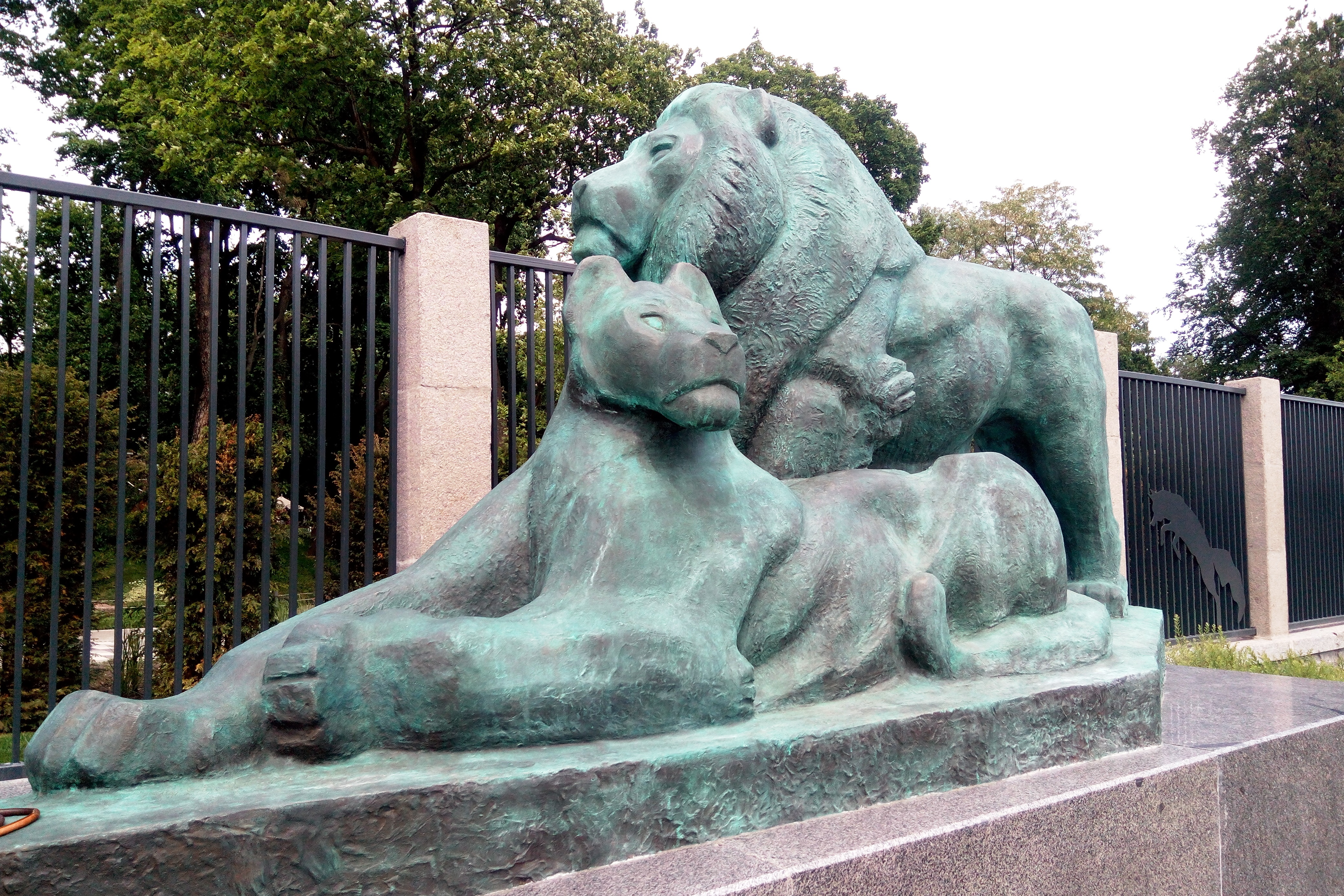
Sculpture "Lion and lioness"

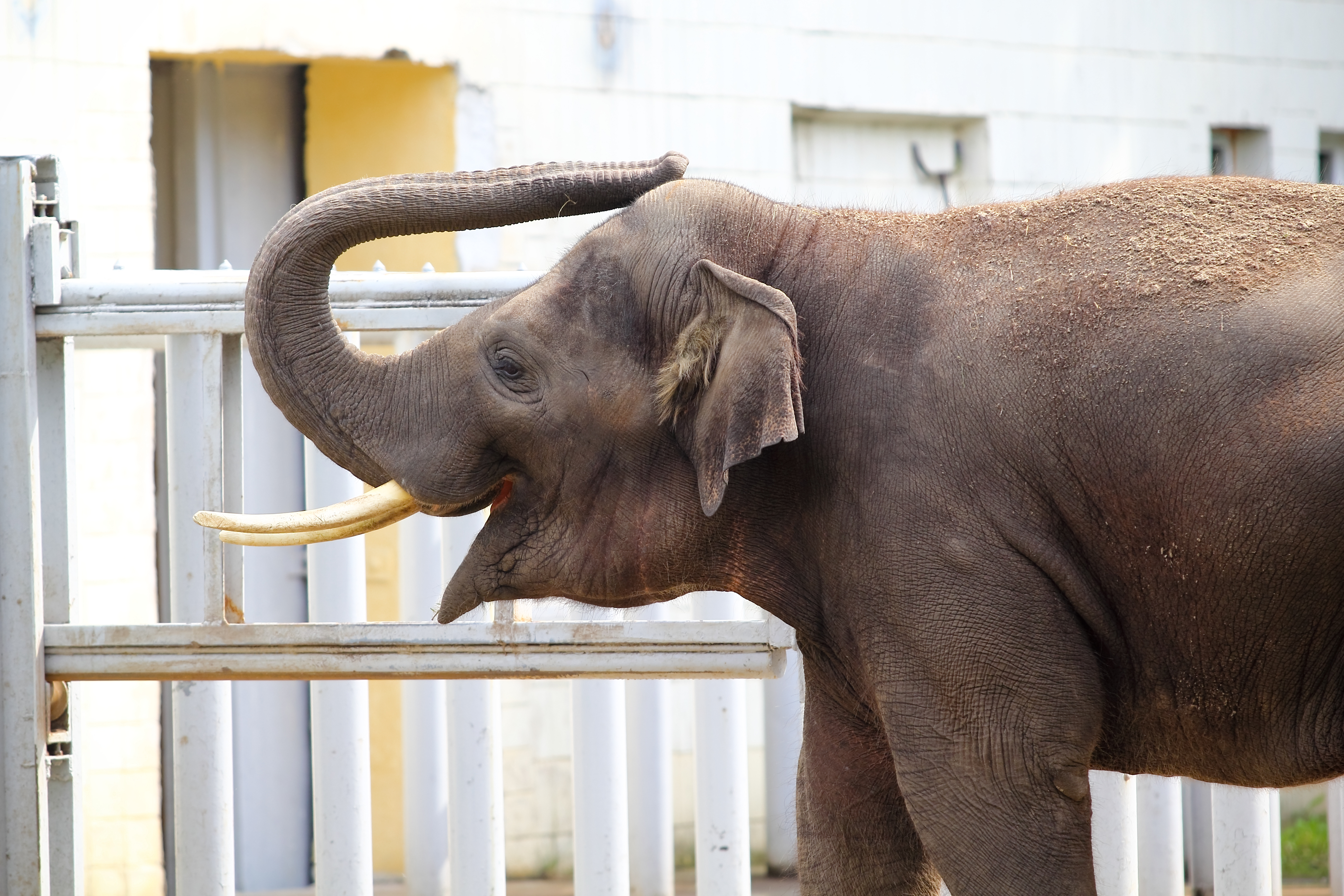
The Asian elephant

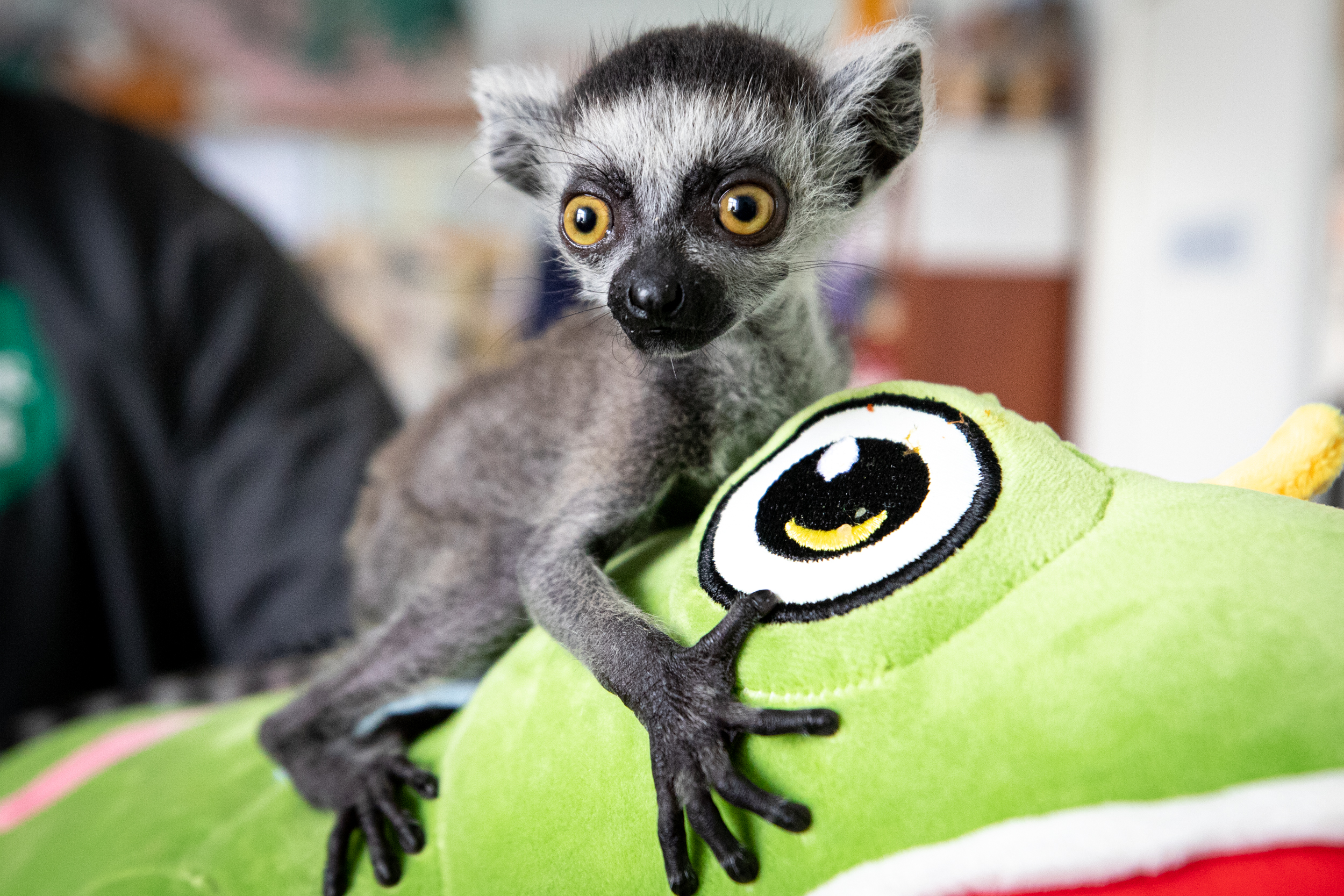
Ring-tailed lemur Bayraktar

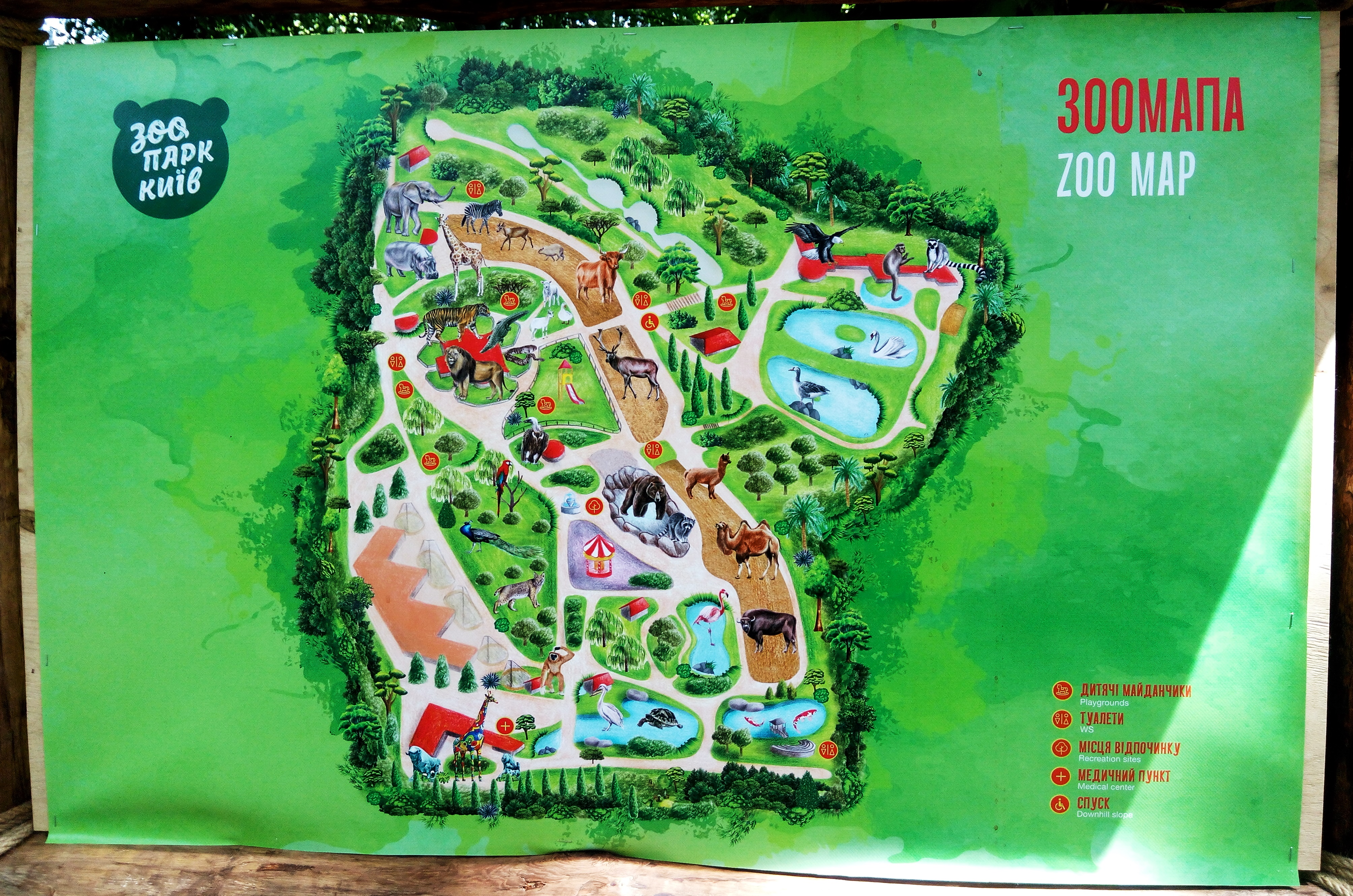
Zoo plan

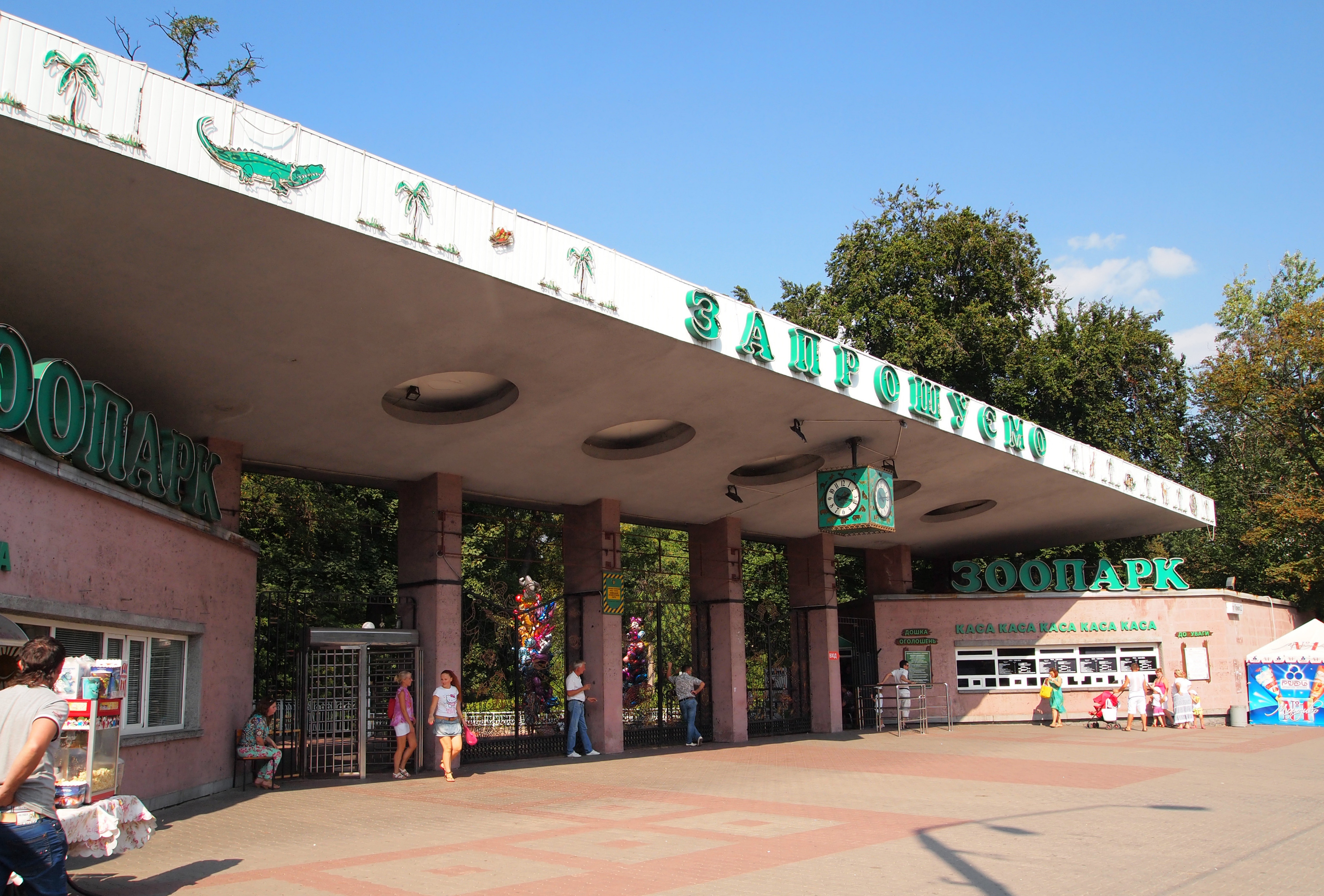
The main entrance to the zoo in 1968-2019
