= Kharkiv Cathedral =

- Intercession Cathedral, Kharkiv (1689)
- Assumption Cathedral, Kharkiv (1777)
- Annunciation Cathedral, Kharkiv (1901)
