= Kharkiv Oblast =

Oblast (region) of Ukraine

Kharkiv Oblast Харківська область
- Oblast
- Kharkivska oblast
- Flag Coat of arms
- Nicknames: Харківщина (Kharkivshchyna), Слобожанщина (Slobozhanshchyna)
- Anthem: Anthem of Kharkiv Oblast
- Coordinates: 49.59°N 36.43°E
- Country: Ukraine
- Established: 27 February 1932
- Administrative center: Kharkiv

Government
  - Governor: Oleh Syniehubov
  - Oblast council: 120 seats
  - Chairperson: Tetyana Yehorova-Lutsenko (Servant of the People)

Area
  - Total: 31,415 km^{2} (12,129 sq mi)
  - Rank: Ranked 4th

Population (2022)
  - Total: 2,598,961 ▼
  - Rank: Ranked 3rd
  - Density: 82.730/km^{2} (214.27/sq mi)

GDP
  - Total: ₴ 320 billion (€8.3 billion)
  - Per capita: ₴ 122,227 (€3,200)
- Time zone: UTC+2 (EET)
  - Summer (DST): UTC+3 (EEST)
- Postal code: 61-64
- Area code: +380-57
- ISO 3166 code: UA-63
- Vehicle registration: AX
- Raions: 7
- Cities: 17
- Settlements: 61
- Villages: 1,683
- HDI (2022): 0.741 high
- FIPS 10-4: UP07
- NUTS statistical regions of Ukraine: UA13
- Website: www.kharkivoda.gov.ua

Kharkiv Oblast (Ukrainian: Харківська область, romanized: Kharkivska oblast, Russian: Харьковская область, romanized: Kharkovskaya oblast), also referred to as Kharkivshchyna (Ukrainian: Харківщина), is an oblast (province) in eastern Ukraine.

Kharkiv borders Luhansk Oblast to the east, Donetsk Oblast to the southeast, Dnipropetrovsk Oblast to the southwest, Poltava Oblast to the west, Sumy Oblast to the northwest and Russia's Belgorod Oblast to the north. Its area is 31,400 square kilometres (12,100 sq mi), or 5.2% of the total territory of Ukraine.

The oblast is the third-most populous of Ukraine, with a population of 2,598,961 in 2021, more than half (1.42 million) of whom live in the city of Kharkiv, the oblast's administrative center.

== Nomenclature ==
Most of Ukraine's oblasts are named after their capital cities, officially called "oblast centers" (Ukrainian: обласний центр, translit. oblasnyi tsentr). The name of each oblast is a relative adjective, formed by adding a feminine suffix to the name of respective center city: Kharkiv is the center of the Kharkivs’ka oblast’ (Kharkiv Oblast). Most oblasts are also sometimes referred to in a feminine noun form, following the convention of traditional regional place names, ending with the suffix "-shchyna", as is the case with the Kharkiv Oblast, Kharkivshchyna.

== Geography ==
The oblast borders Russia (Belgorod Oblast) to the north, Luhansk Oblast to the east, Donetsk Oblast to the southeast, Dnipropetrovsk Oblast to the southwest, Poltava Oblast to the west and Sumy Oblast to the northwest.

The northern and central parts are part of historic Sloboda Ukraine, and the southern part is part of historic Zaporizhzhia.

== History ==
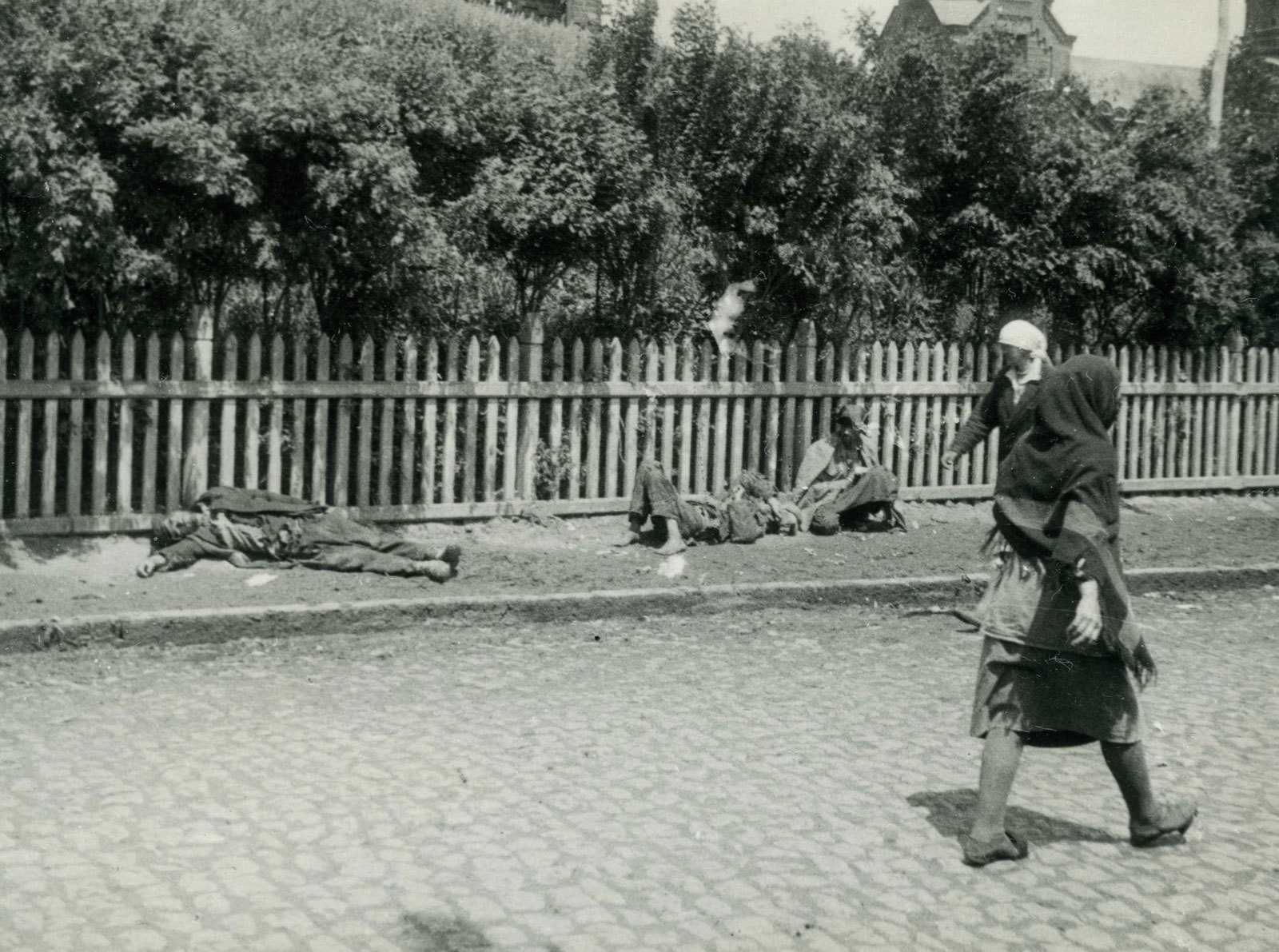
Starved people on the street during the Holodomor in Kharkiv, 1933

During the Soviet administrative reform of 1923–1929, the Kharkov Governorate was abolished in 1925 leaving its five okruhas: Okhtyrka (originally Bohodukhiv), Izium, Kupiansk, Sumy, and Kharkiv. Introduced in the Soviet Union in 1923, a similar subdivisions existed in Ukraine back in 1918. In 1930 all okruhas were also abolished with raions becoming the first level of subdivision of Ukraine until 1932.

The modern Kharkiv Oblast was established on 27 February 1932. In the summer of 1932, some parts of the oblast were included in the newly created Donetsk Oblast originally centered in Artemivsk (later in Stalino). Then in the fall, some territories of the Kharkiv Oblast were used in the creation of Chernihiv Oblast. More territories became part of Poltava Oblast in fall of 1937 and Sumy Oblast in winter of 1939.

During the Holodomor the population of the Kharkiv Oblast together with Kyiv Oblast suffered the most. During World War II, it was the site of large Soviet massacres of Poles (Piatykhatky) and German massacres of Jews (Drobytsky Yar). The region saw major fighting during World War II in several Battles of Kharkov between 1941 and 1943.

During the 1991 referendum, 86.33% of votes in Kharkiv Oblast were in favor of the Declaration of Independence of Ukraine. A survey conducted in December 2014 by the Kyiv International Institute of Sociology found 4.2% of the oblast's population supported their region joining Russia, 71.5% did not support the idea, and the rest were undecided or did not respond.

Following the Euromaidan, there was pro-Russian unrest in the region, and central government buildings were taken over by separatists in a failed attempt to create a separatist 'Kharkov's People's Republic'. The region also became a very popular destination for refugees from the Russian-occupied Donetsk and Luhansk Oblast regions.

=== Russian invasion of Ukraine ===
As part of the 2022 Russian invasion of Ukraine, the Russian military launched a major military offensive in the region, which resulted in the occupation of parts of the oblast. By late August, about one third of the territory of Kharkiv Oblast was occupied including Izium and Kupiansk. In July 2022, the Donetsk People's Republic signed a memorandum to "liberate Kharkiv from Ukraine".

In early September 2022, the Ukrainian military commenced a counteroffensive in the region. Several settlements in the region were recaptured from Russian control. By 10 September 2022, Ukraine had recaptured Kupiansk and Izium. On 11 September, Russia had retreated from many of the settlements it previously occupied in the oblast and the Russian Ministry of Defense announced a formal withdrawal of Russian forces from most of Kharkiv Oblast stating that an "operation to curtail and transfer troops" was underway." By 12 September 2022, as the Russian front lines in Kharkiv Oblast continued to collapse, Ukrainian forces had managed to push back to the northeastern border with Russia in some areas of the region. By 3 October 2022, Russian forces had almost completely withdrawn from Kharkiv Oblast. As of 2023, fighting continues in the easternmost parts of the oblast in the Battle of the Svatove–Kreminna line. In May 2024, Russia launched a renewed offensive in northern Kharkiv Oblast, however the frontline stabilised shortly after and has remained at a halt since, with only marginal advances reported. In late 2024, amidst a Russian offensive in Donetsk Oblast and a Ukrainian offensive into Russia’s Kursk Oblast, Russian forces started new offensive operations in eastern Kharkiv Oblast, with the aim of recrossing the Oskil river and capturing Kupiansk.

== Demographics ==
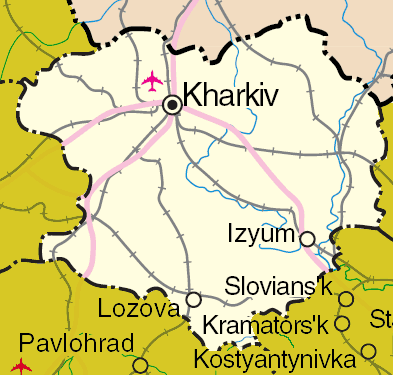
Detailed map of Kharkiv Oblast

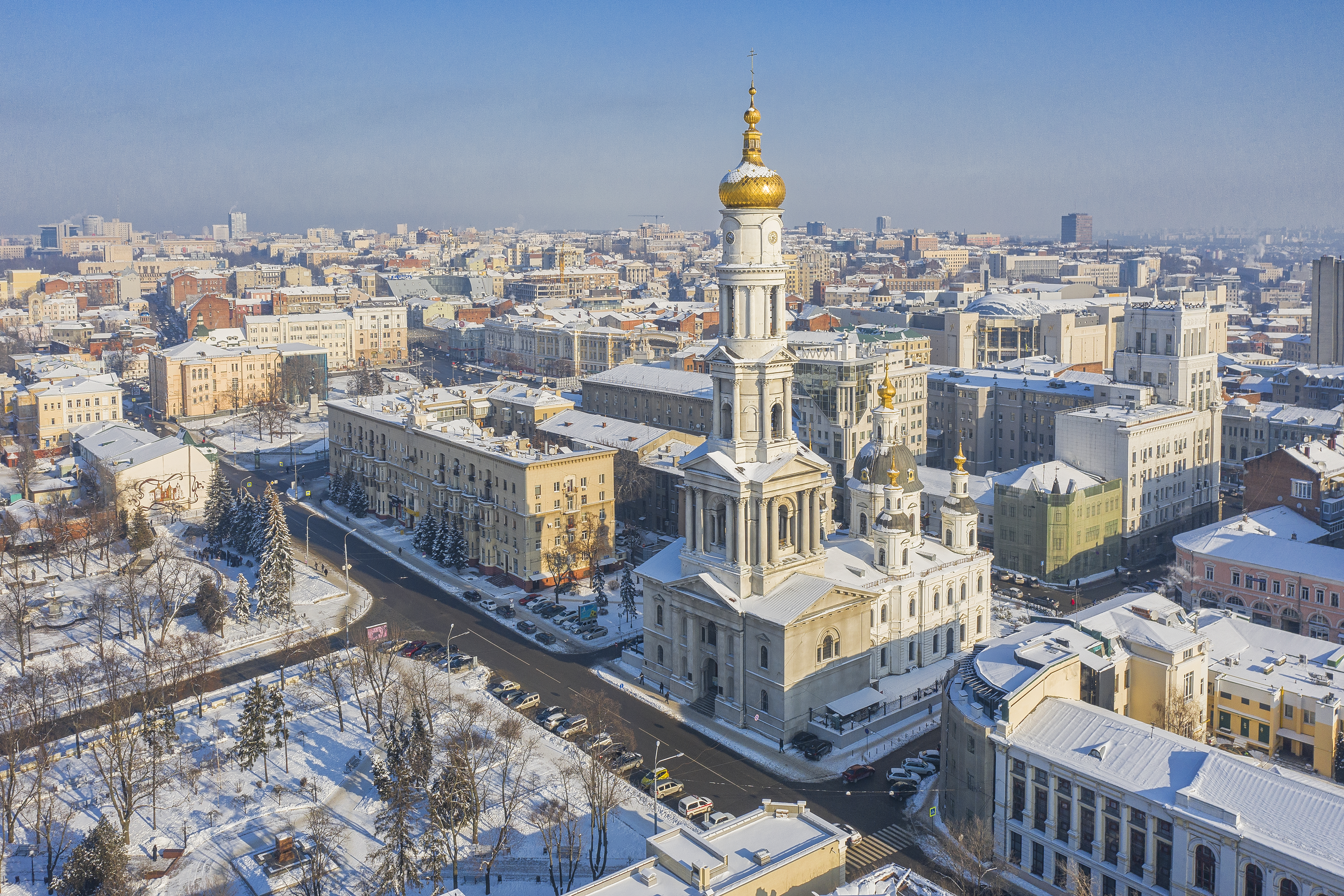
Kharkiv

Historical population
Year	Pop.	±%
1970	2,826,122	—
1979	3,055,655	+8.1%
1989	3,195,046	+4.6%
2001	2,914,212	−8.8%
2011	2,755,108	−5.5%
2022	2,598,961	−5.7%

Its population in 2001 was 2,895,800 million (1,328,900 males (45.9%) and 1,566,900 females (54.1%)).

At the 2001 census, the ethnic groups within the Kharkiv Oblast were:

- Ukrainians – 70.7%
- Russians – 25.6%
- Belarusians – 0.5%
- Jews – 0.4%
- Armenians – 0.4%
- Azeris – 0.2%
- Georgians – 0.15%
- Tatars – 0.14%
- Others – 2.1%

Groups by native language:

- Ukrainian – 53.8%
- Russian – 44.3%
- Other languages – 1.9%

=== Age structure ===
0–14 years: 12.6% ▲ (male 177,464/female 167,321)
15–64 years: 72.2% ▼ (male 945,695/female 1,024,841)
65 years and over: 15.2% (male 135,737/female 277,725) (2013 official)

=== Median age ===
total: 40.5 years ▲
male: 36.9 years
female: 44.1 years ▲ (2013 official)

=== Religion ===
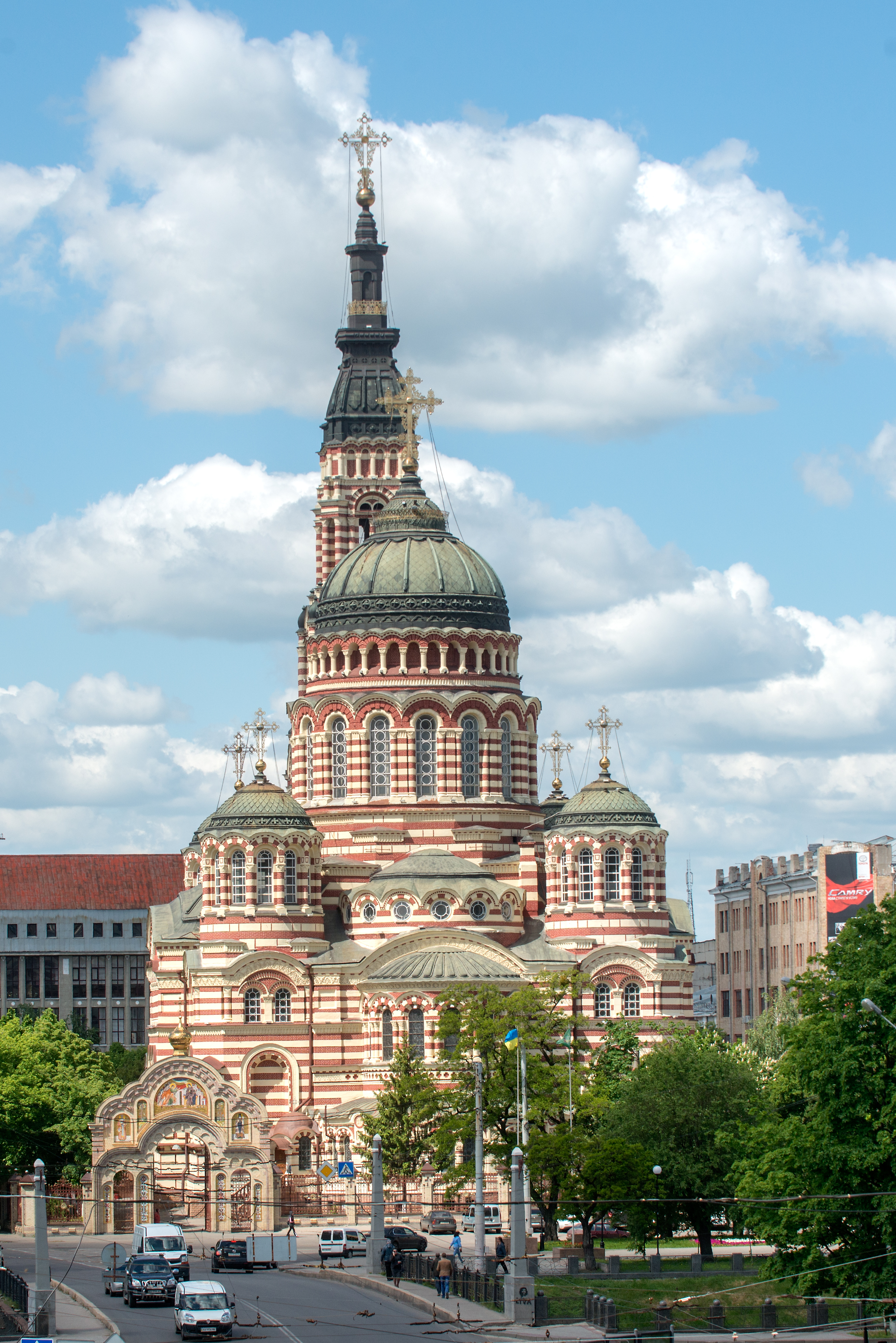
Annunciation Orthodox Cathedral is one of the tallest Orthodox churches in the world. It was completed on 2 October 1888.

In 2007, there were 700 religious associations in the Kharkiv Oblast, including:

- 265 – Ukrainian Orthodox Church (Moscow Patriarchate)
- 116 – Baptists
- 83 – Jehovah's Witnesses
- 39 – Seventh-day Adventists Church
- 34 – Christians of the Evangelical Faith
- 25 – Pentecostals
- 13 – Ukrainian Orthodox Church of the Kyivan Patriarchate (now Orthodox Church of Ukraine)
- 12 – Ukrainian Autocephalous Orthodox Church (now Orthodox Church of Ukraine)
- 9 – Judaism
- 6 – Ukrainian Greek Catholic Church
- 6 – Roman Catholic Church

=== Cities and towns ===
Ranked by population, the oblast's 12 largest municipalities are:

1. Kharkiv (1,421,125)
2. Lozova (53,126)
3. Izium (44,979)
4. Chuhuiv (31,018)
5. Zlatopil (28,510)
6. Kupiansk (26,627)
7. Balakliia (26,334)
8. Merefa (21,202)
9. Liubotyn (20,001)
10. Berestyn (19,674)
11. Vovchansk (17,459)
12. Derhachi (17,139)

== Administrative divisions ==
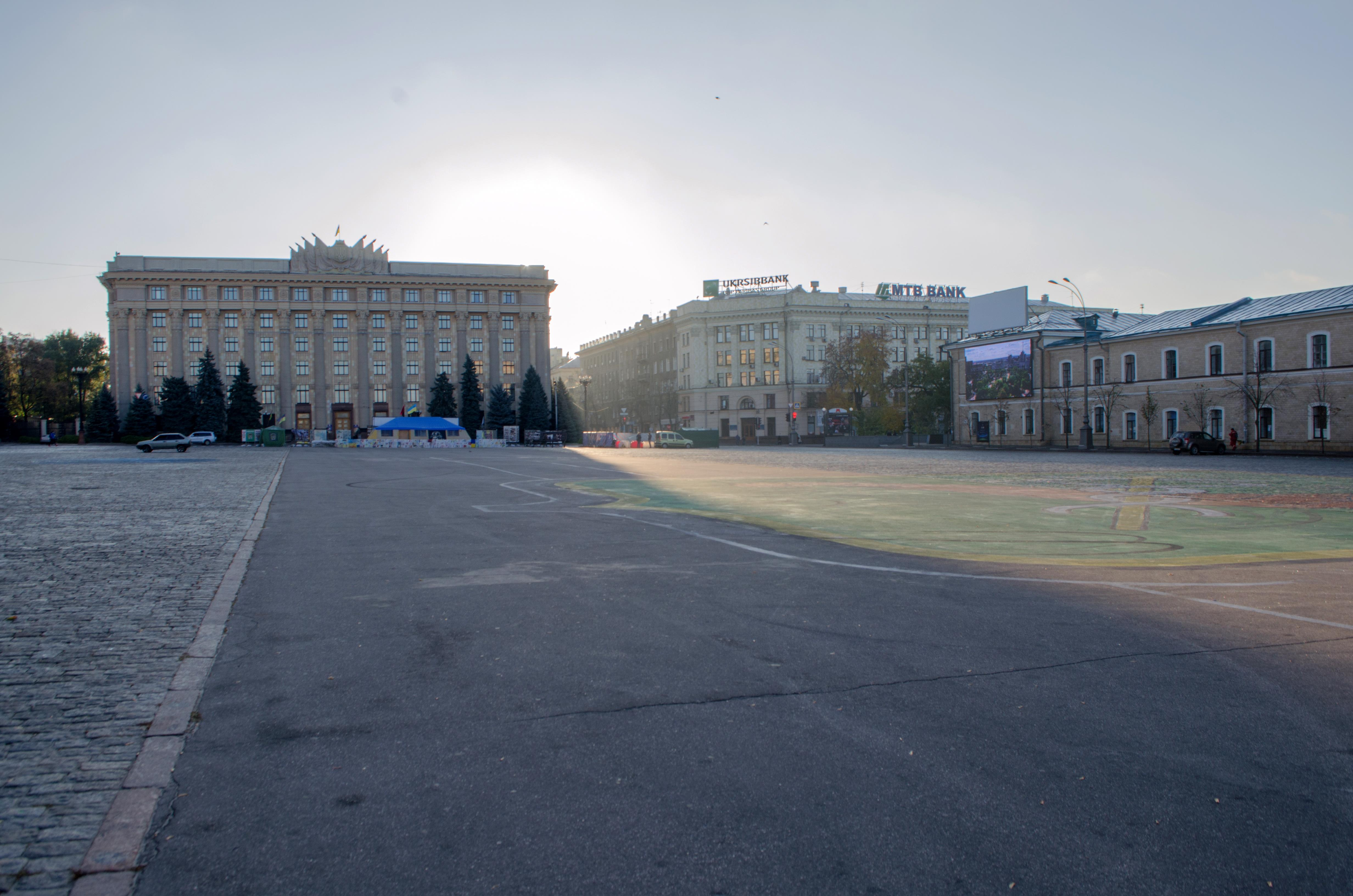
Building of Kharkiv Regional Administration

Kharkiv Oblast is administratively subdivided into seven raions. Prior to the 2020 administrative reform, there were 25 raions, and also seven cities (municipalities) that were directly subordinate to the oblast government (Chuhuiv, Izium, Kupiansk, Liubotyn, Lozova, Pervomaiskyi, and the administrative center of the oblast, Kharkiv).

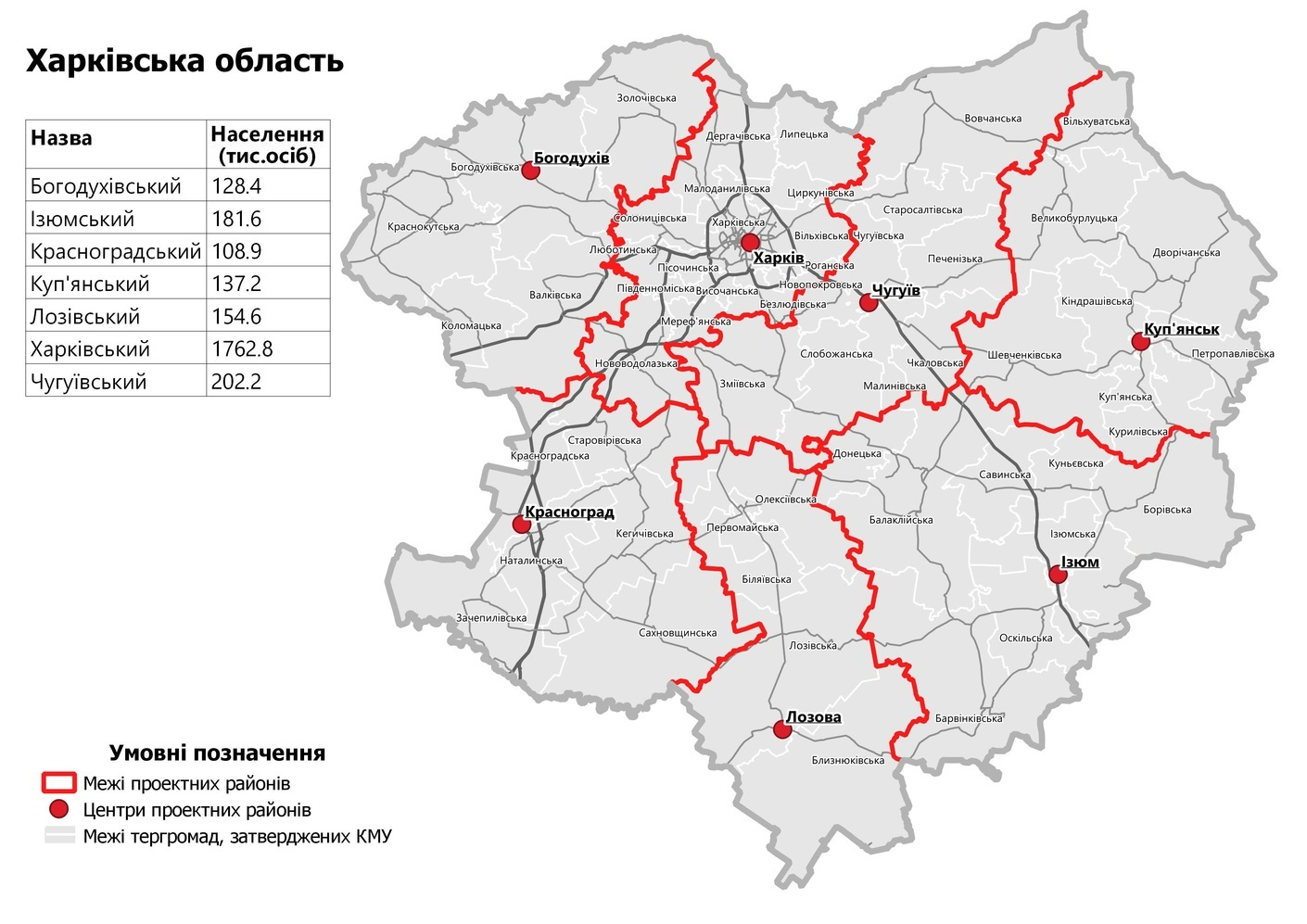
Map of Kharkiv Oblast.

Name	Ukrainian name	Area (km^{2})	Population (2022)	Admin. center
Berestyn Raion	Берестинський район	4335	103,856	Berestyn
Bohodukhiv Raion	Богодухівський район	4508	122,287	Bohodukhiv
Chuhuiv Raion	Чугуївський район	4804	194,177	Chuhuiv
Izium Raion	Ізюмський район	5906	172,130	Izium
Kharkiv Raion	Харківський район	3222	1,727,573	Kharkiv
Kupiansk Raion	Куп’янський район	4612	130,111	Kupiansk
Lozova Raion	Лозівський район	4027	147,361	Lozova

== Economy ==
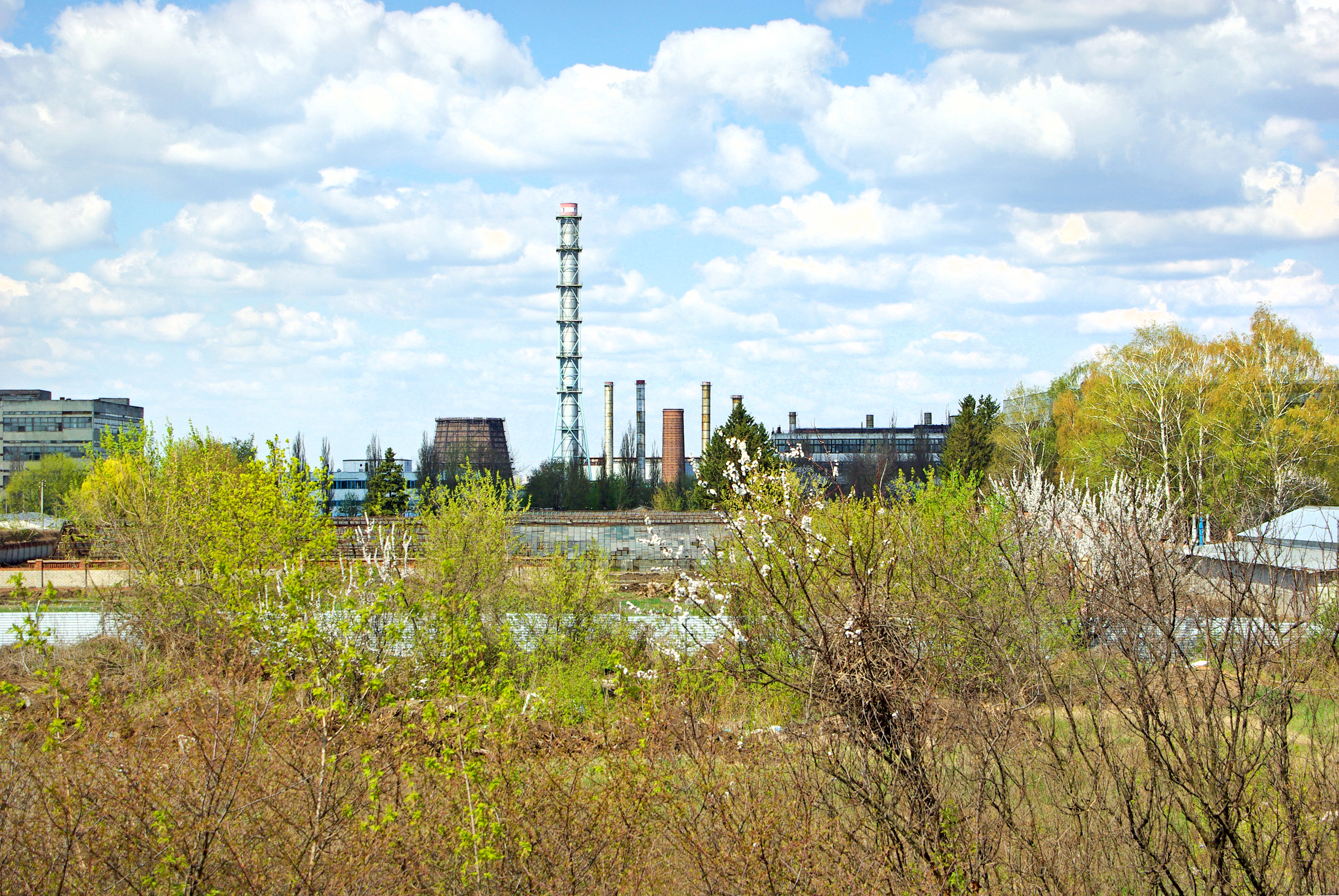
View of the Turboatom plant.

The Kharkiv oblast has a primarily industrial economy, including engineering, metallurgy, manufacturing, production of chemicals and food processing. It also has an important agricultural sector with 19,000 square kilometres of arable land (comprising 5.9% of the total arable lands of Ukraine). Agricultural production grew substantially in 2015.

Also in Kharkiv is the airplane plant for space controlling systems. It is a major center for all branches of engineering, from large-scale manufacture to microelectronics. Also situated in Kharkiv Oblast is a gas field, which is one of the biggest in Ukraine.

== Transport ==
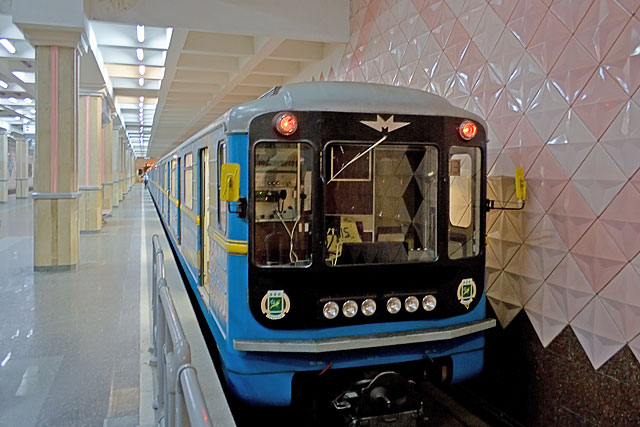
Kharkiv Metro

The Kharkiv Oblast has an undeveloped transport network, 60% of the total transportation falls on the part of the rail transport. At the end of 2020, the operational life of the salivary lines of the gas station on the territory of the Kharkiv region was 1520 km.

Kharkiv Salvage University serves 10 million passengers on the river, road transport, sedation, buses - about 12 million. The largest salvage stations are Izium, Kupiansk, Liubotyn, Lozova.

In the Kharkiv Oblast, in 2019, 31.4878 million passengers traveled through travel transport services, or 96.5% of the total in 2018.

The most important highways that pass through the region: Kharkiv-Moscow, Kharkiv-Simferopol, Kharkiv-Rostov-on-Don, Kharkiv-Poltava. The total length of highways in the past is more than 9.7 thousand km, of which 97.5% are on hard surfaces. The length of the autoshlyakh of the sovereign venue in the Kharkiv Oblast is 2343.9 km, including 617.4 km - the MITERNINI, 108.2 km - National Monalni, 639.1 km - regions, 979.2 km - Teritorialne. On highways of national importance in the region there are 242 bridges with a total length of 1316.3 linear meters. m.

Kharkiv airport serves domestic and international airlines, mainly engaged in passenger transportation.

== Points of interest ==
The following sites were nominated for the Seven Wonders of Ukraine.

- Derzhprom Building
- Intercession Monastery in Kharkiv
- Skovoroda Museum

== Sport ==
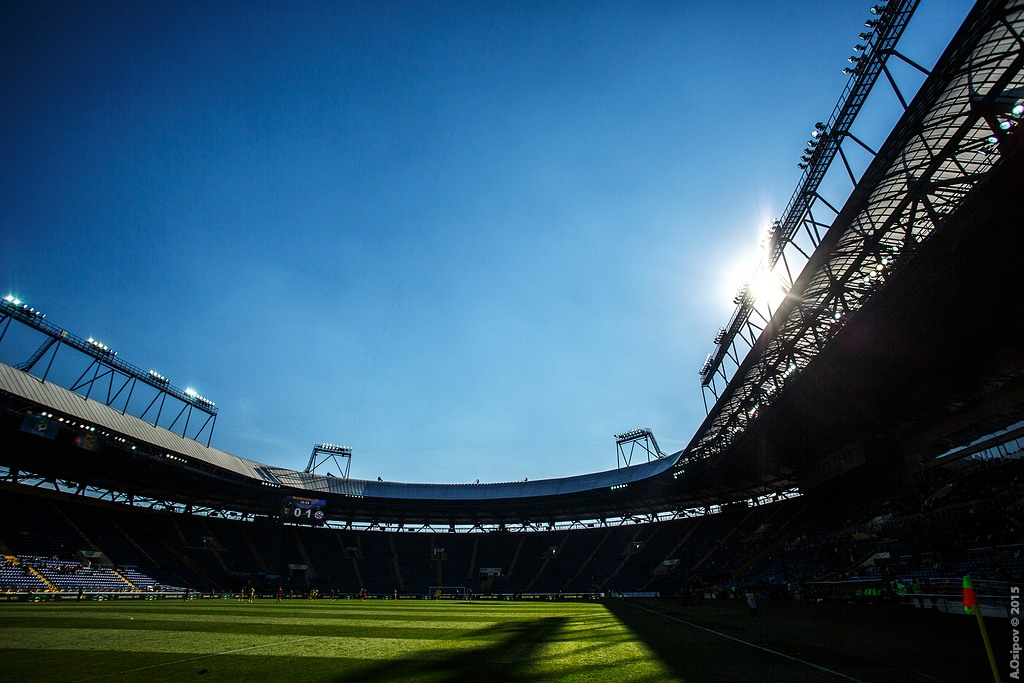
Metalist Stadium

It has a regional federation within the Ukrainian Bandy and Rink bandy Federation.

== Education ==
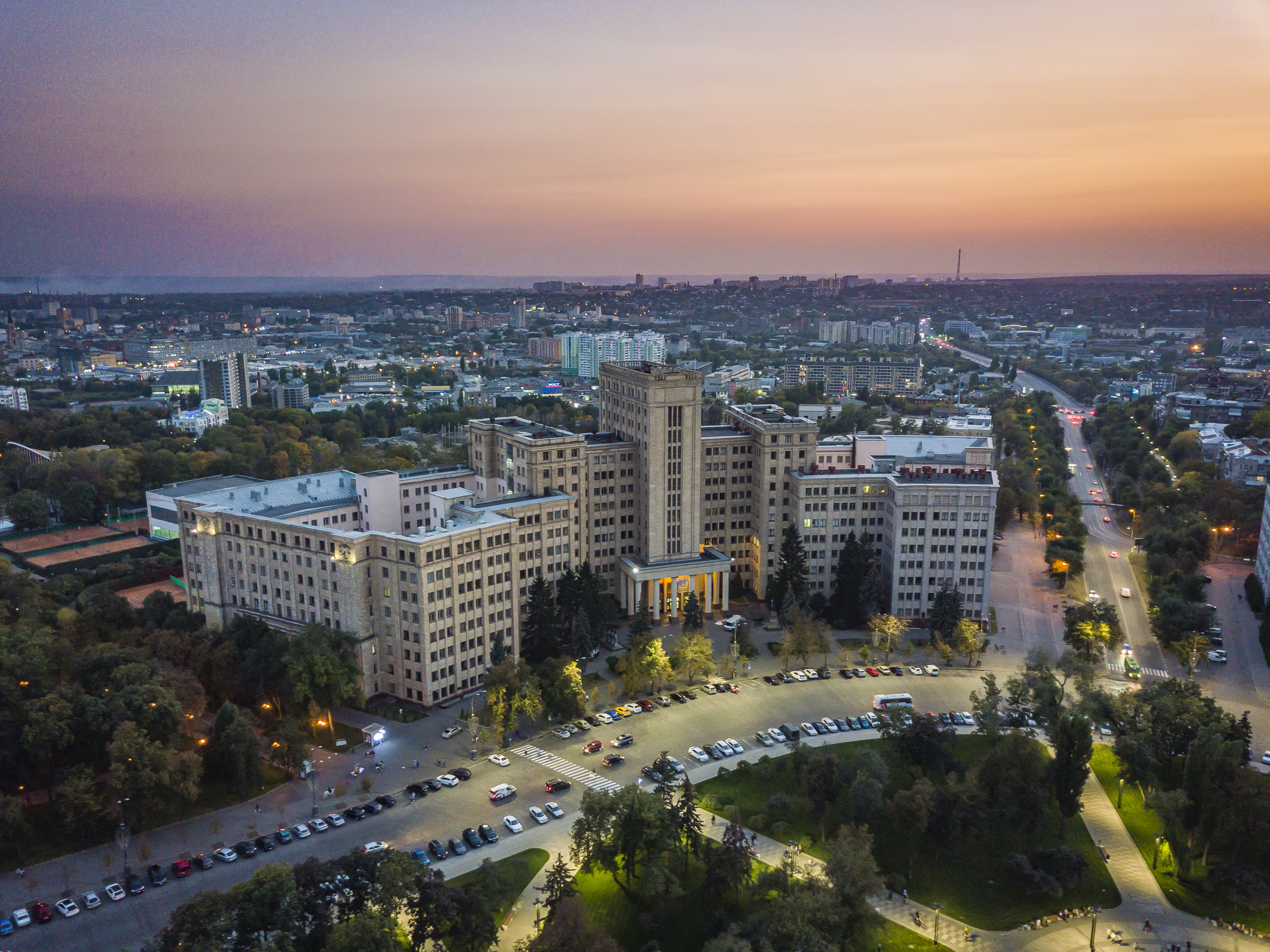
Main building of V. N. Karazin Kharkiv National University

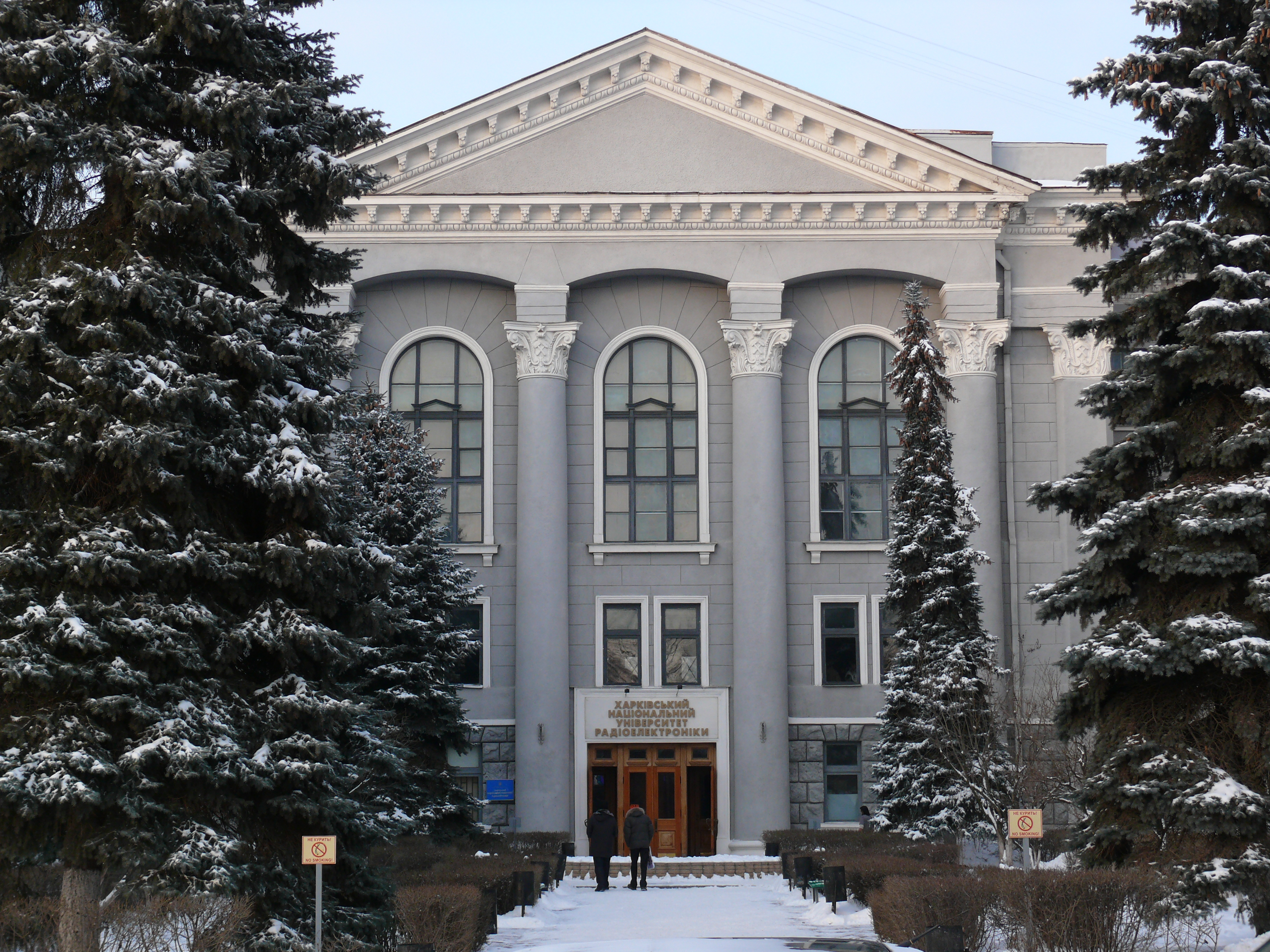
Kharkiv National University of Radioelectronics

In 2020, 104,900 people aged 15–70 worked in the education sector of the Kharkiv region, or 8.7% of the total number of people employed in the region's economy.

At the end of 2020, there were 753 preschool education institutions in the region (11 more institutions compared to 2019), designed for 79.7 thousand places. The number of their pupils was 74,100 children (3,400 less than in 2019).

At the beginning of the 2020/21 academic year, there were 734 institutions of general secondary education in Kharkiv region, 258,800 students studied in them and 22,700 teachers (including part-time teachers) worked in them. In 2020, 14,300 graduates received a certificate of complete general secondary education.

At the end of 2020, there were 39 institutions of professional (vocational and technical) education in the region, in which 13,700 people studied.

At the beginning of the 2020/21 academic year, there were 55 institutions of higher education in the region, and 124,200 people studied in them. In 2020, higher education institutions of the region accepted 29,800 people to study, and graduated 44,000 specialists. Postgraduate students were trained by 55 institutions of higher education and scientific institutions, in which 3,400 postgraduate students received their education. 5.6 thousand people obtained professional preliminary education in 8 educational institutions. More than 19,000 scientific, scientific-pedagogical and pedagogical workers worked in institutions of higher and professional pre-higher education.

== Notable people from Kharkiv Oblast ==
- Hryhorii Skovoroda – Ukrainian philosopher (1722–1794)
- Ilya Repin – Russian realist painter (1844–1930)
- Élie Metchnikoff – Russian immunologist (1845–1916)
- Alexander Potebnja – Russian-Ukrainian philosopher, linguist and panslavist activist
- George Shevelov – Ukrainian-American linguist (1908–2002)
- Dmytro Bahalii – Ukrainian historian
- Hryhorii Kvitka-Osnovianenko – Ukrainian writer, journalist, and playwright (1778–1843)
- Arkady Averchenko – Russian playwright and satirist
- Anton Makarenko – Soviet educator, social worker and writer
- Vasily Karazin – Ukrainian scientist
- Lyudmila Gurchenko – Soviet and Russian actress, singer (1935–2011)

== Gallery ==
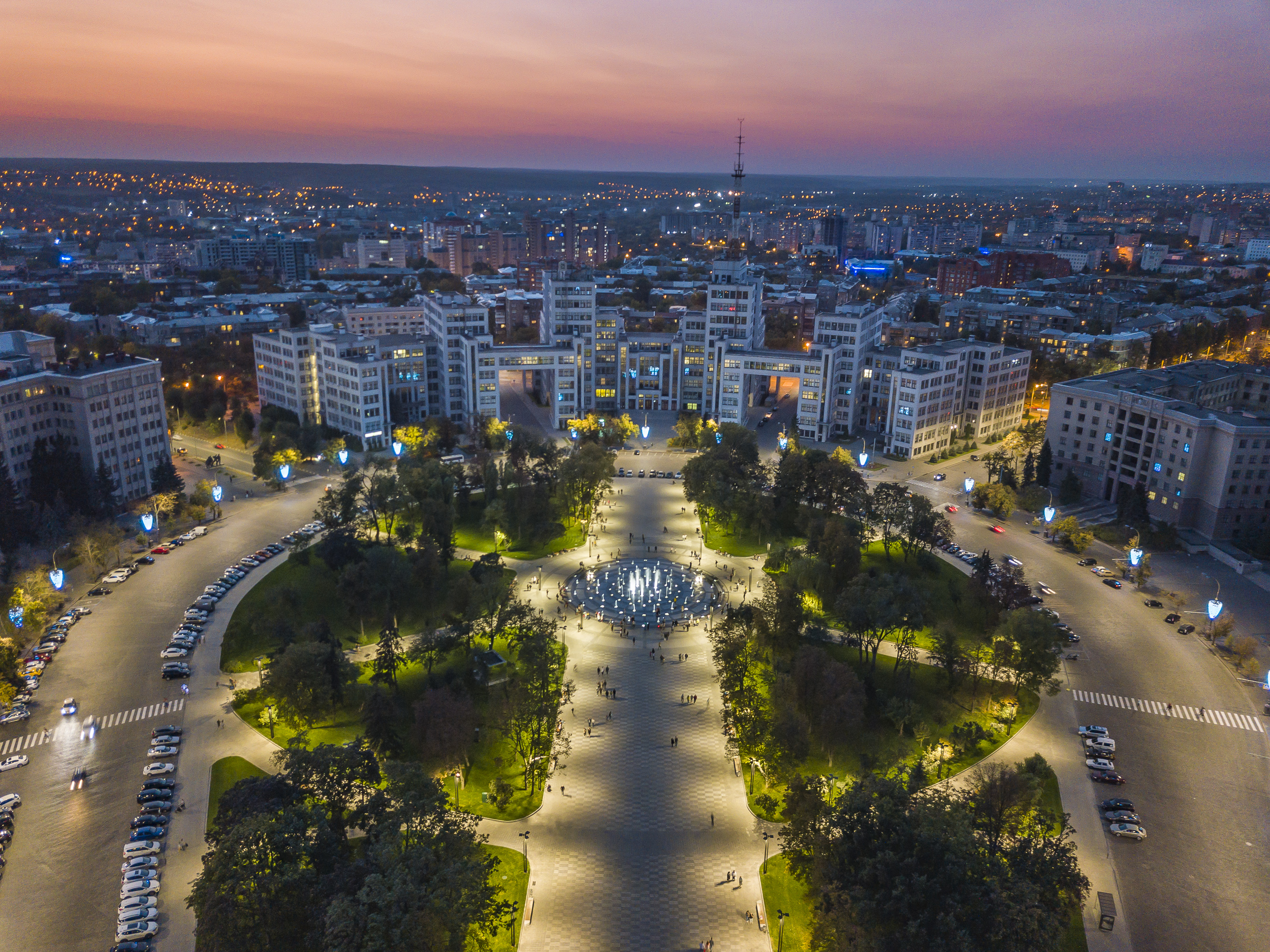
Derzhprom, Kharkiv

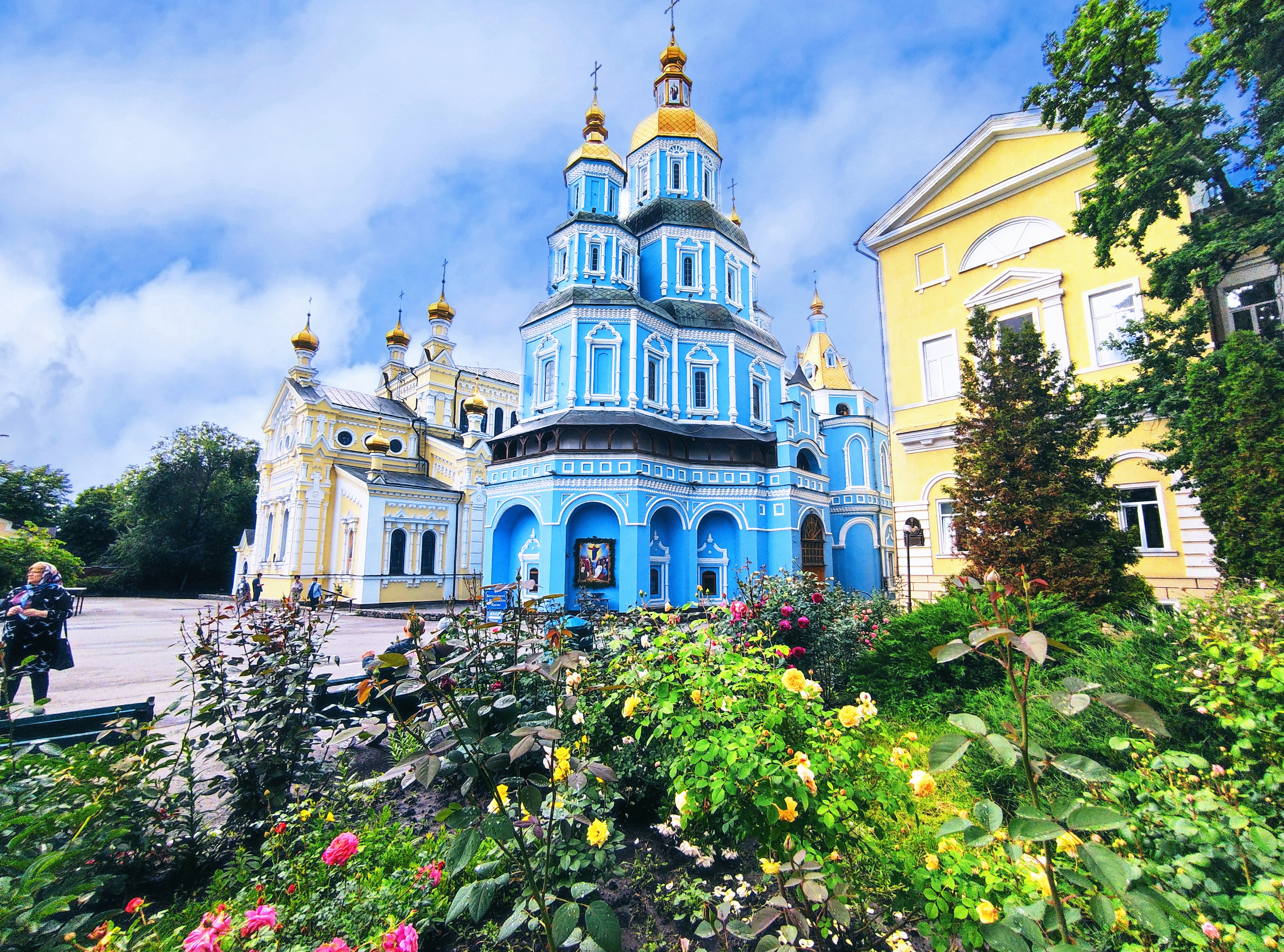
Intercession Cathedral, Kharkiv

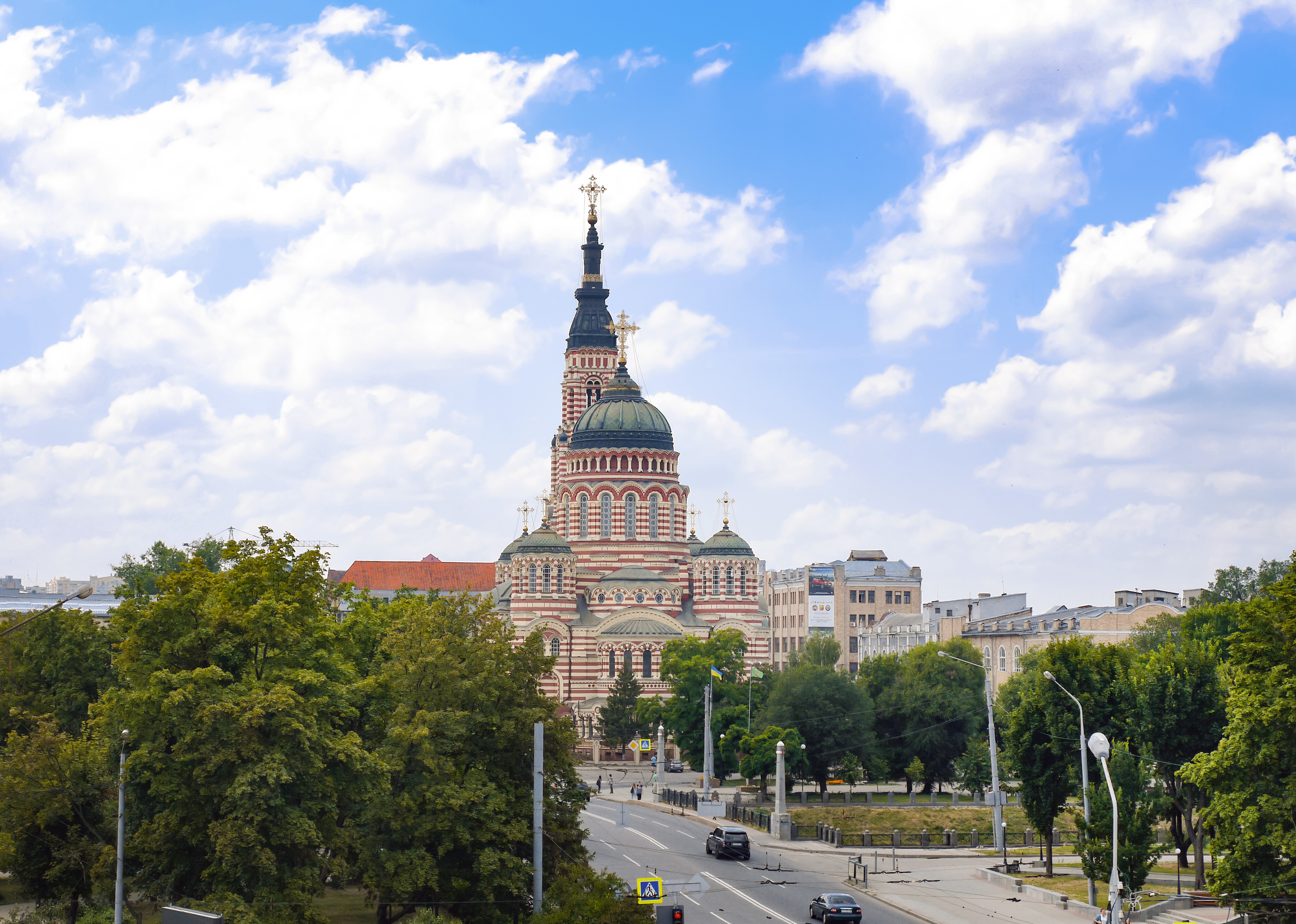
Annunciation Cathedral, Kharkiv

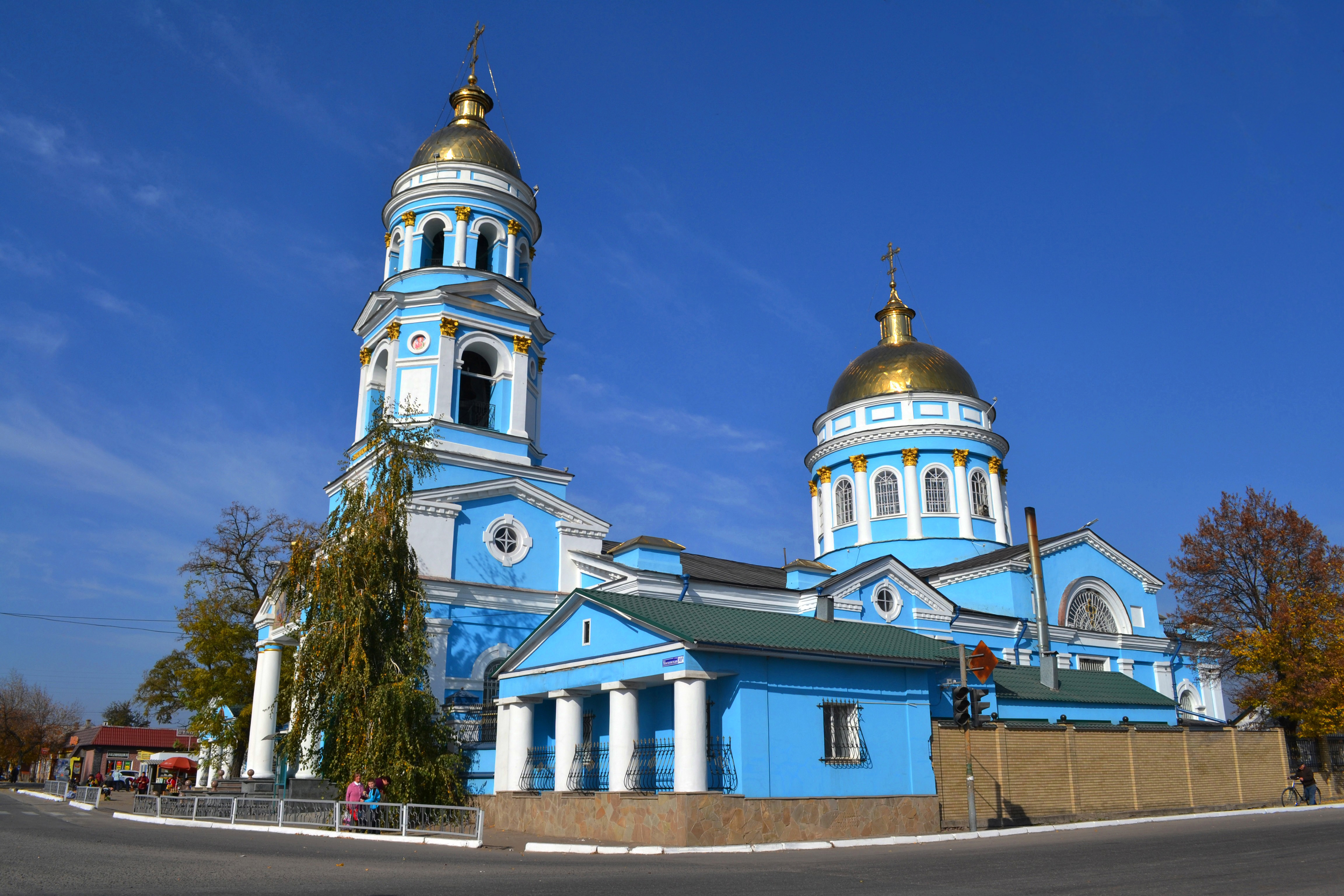
Ascension Cathedral, Izium

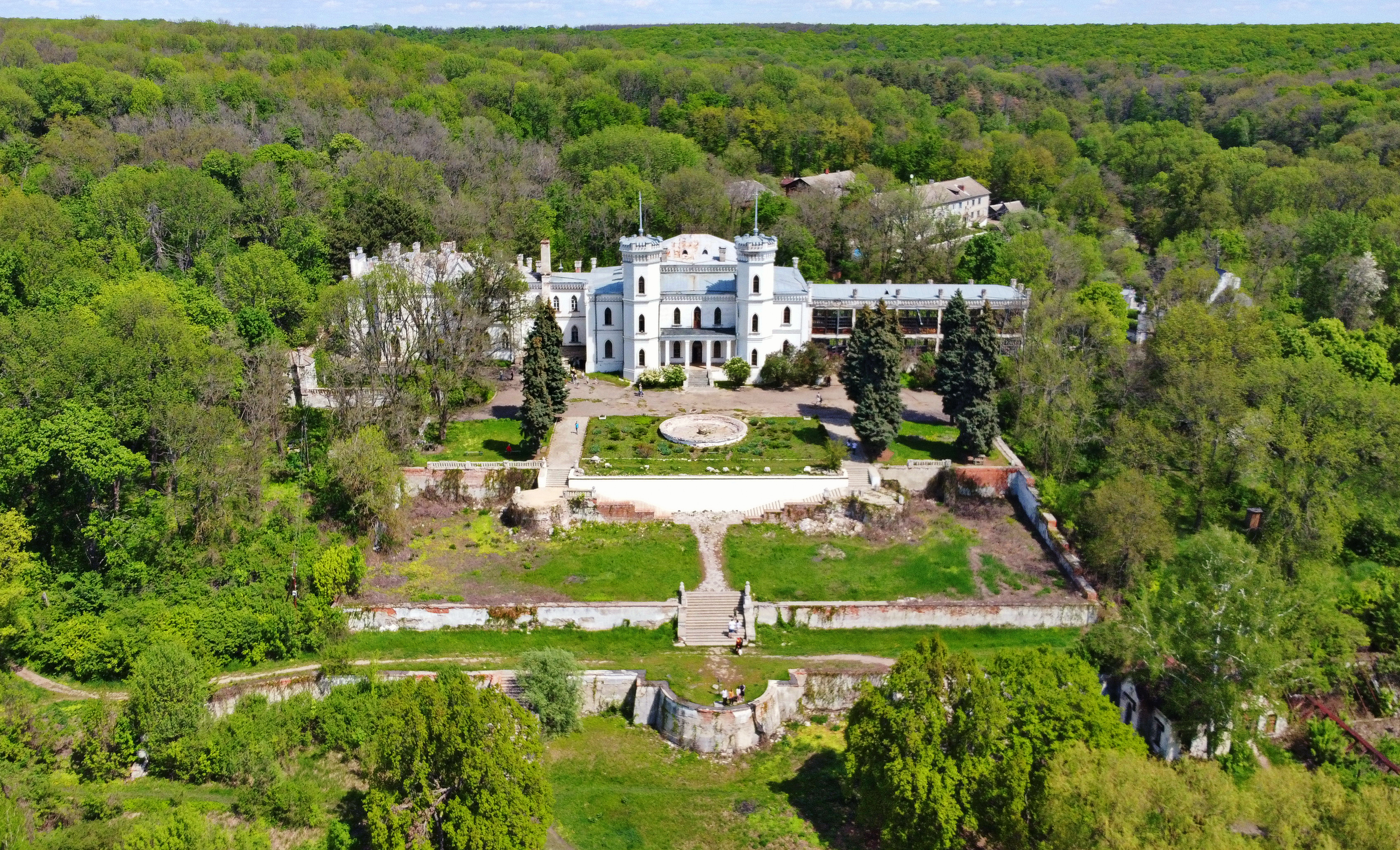
Sharivka Palace and Park Ensemble

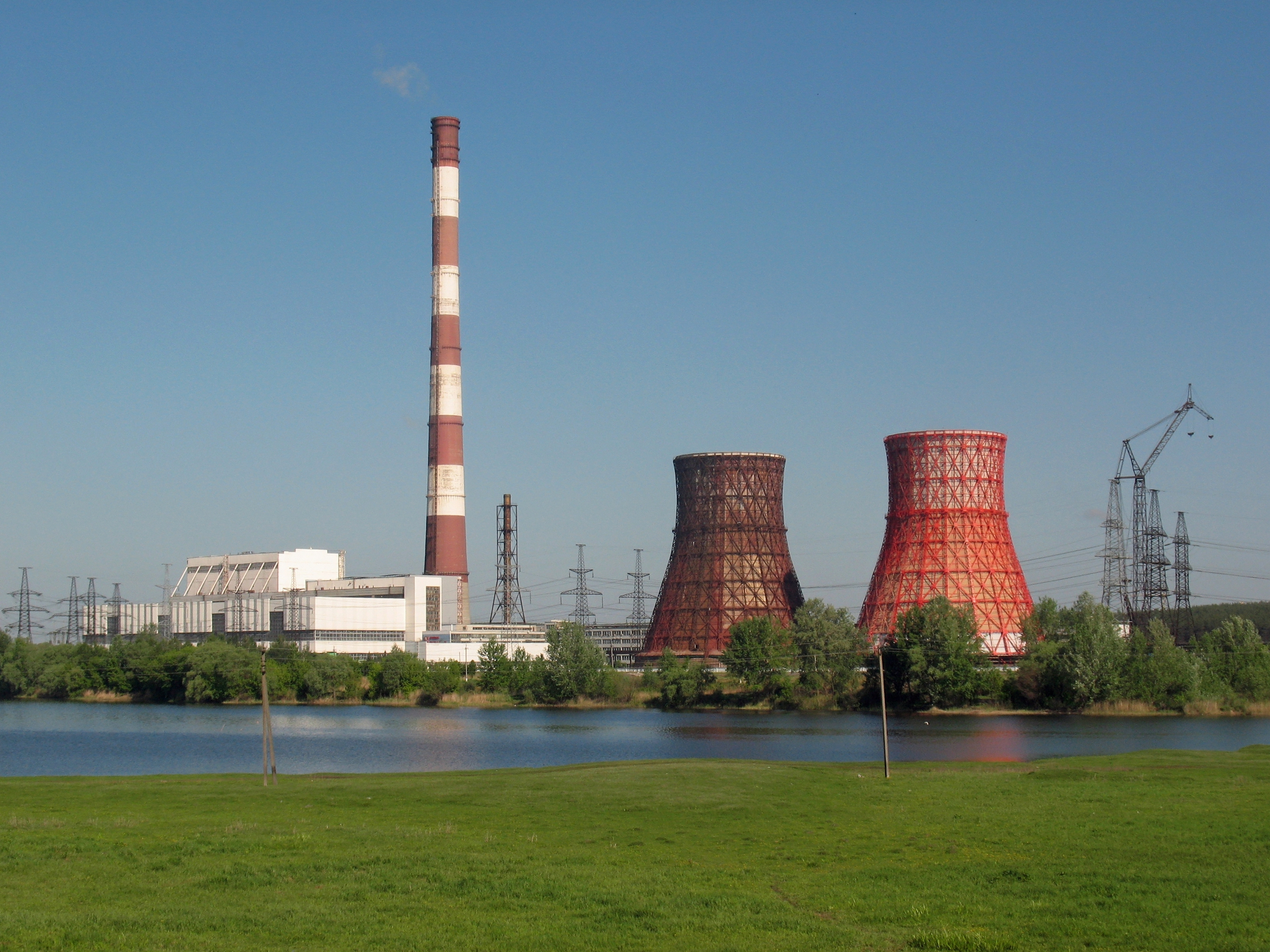
Kharkiv TEC-5, Pisochyn

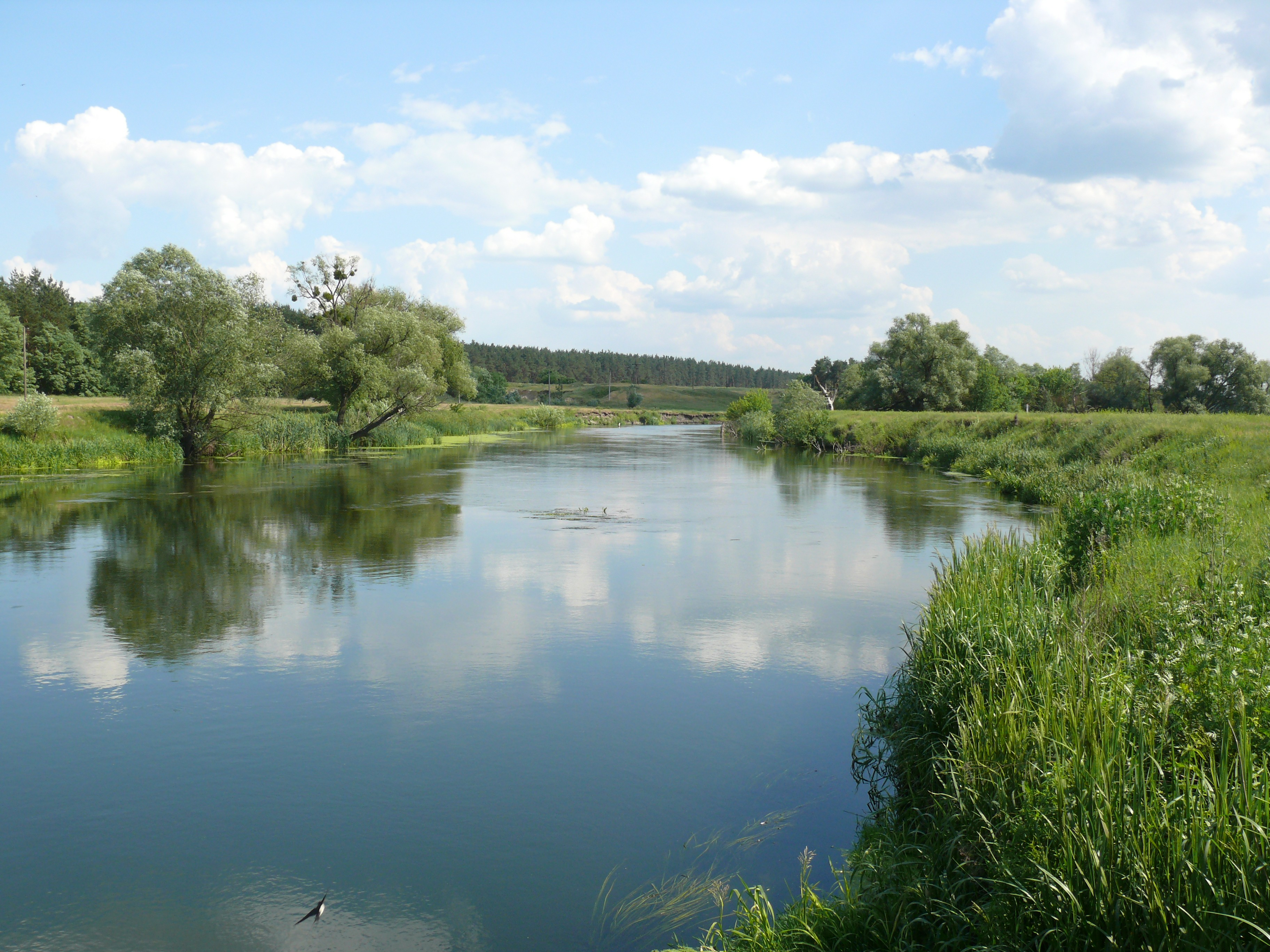
View of Siverskyi Donets

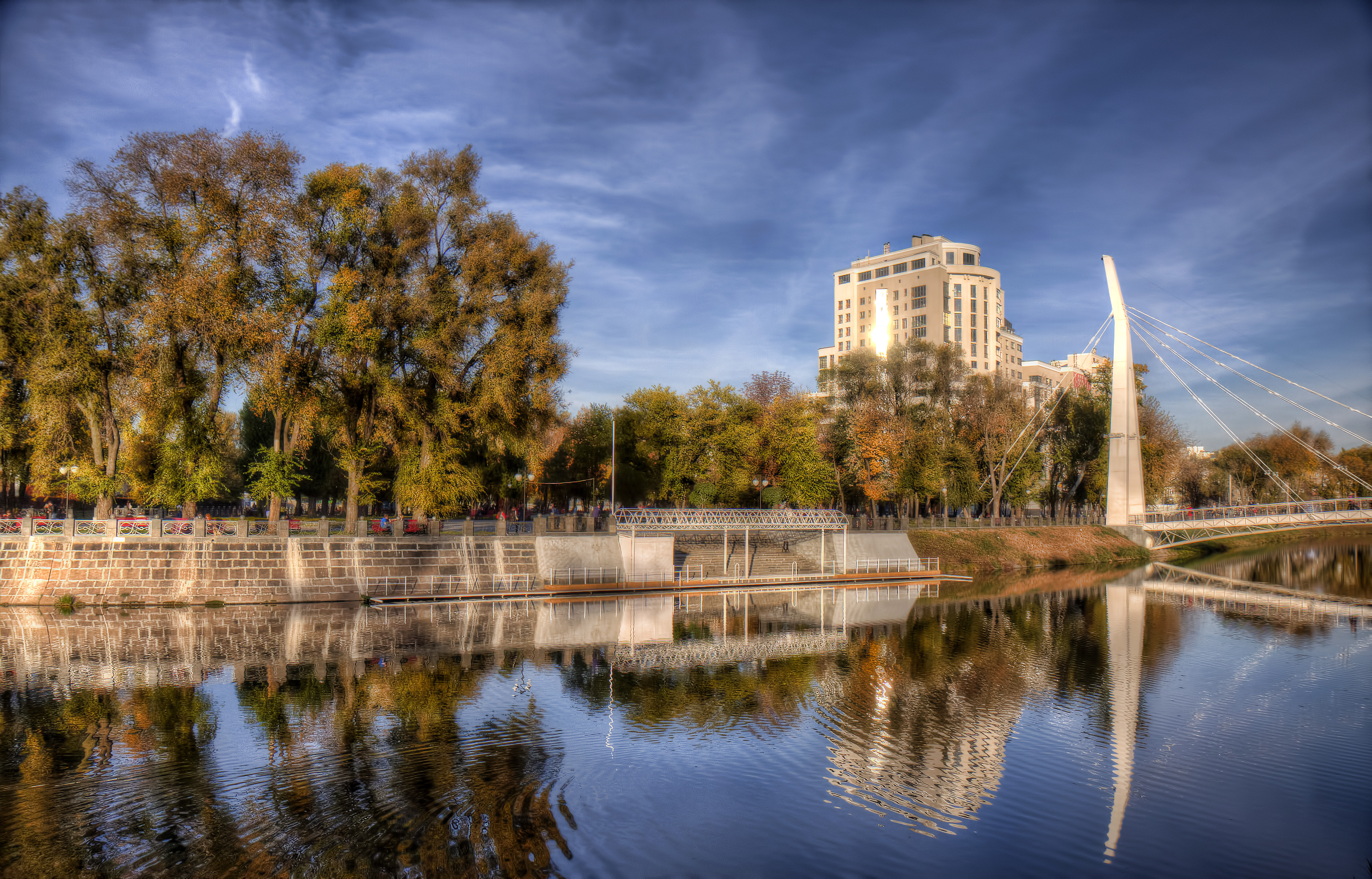
Autumn landscape, Kharkiv

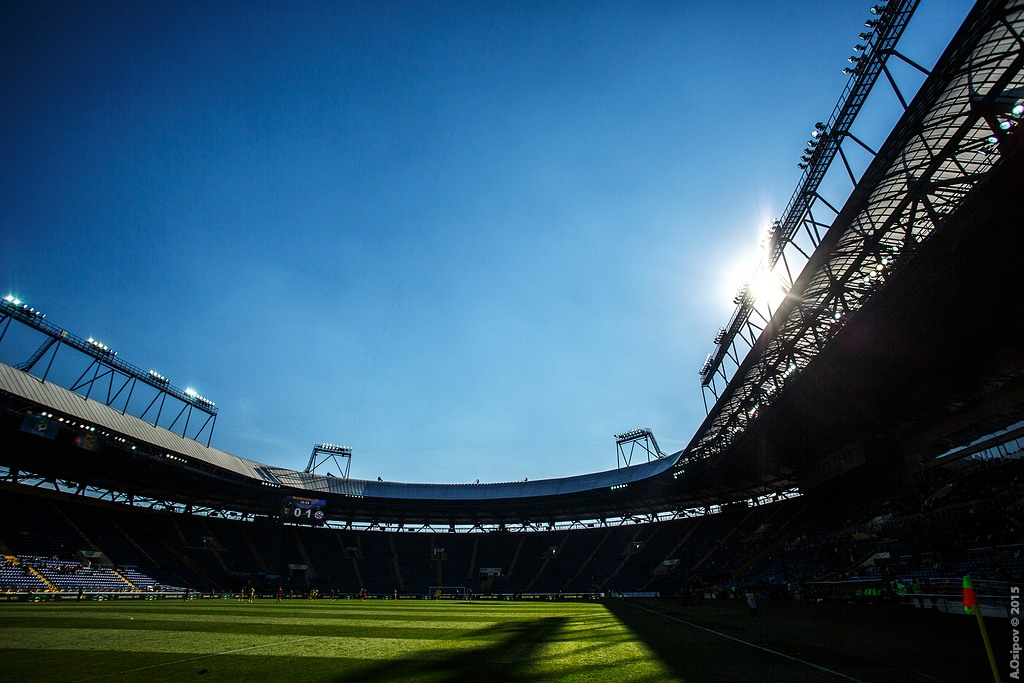
OSK Metalist Stadium

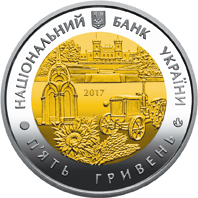
Jubilee coin of the NBU dedicated to the Kharkiv Oblast (obverse)

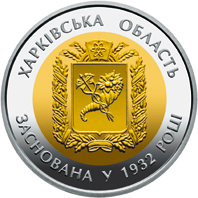
Jubilee coin of the NBU dedicated to the Kharkiv Oblast (reverse)

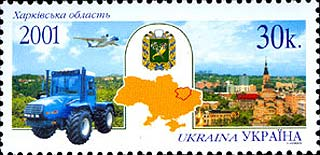
Stamp for the anniversary of the Kharkiv Oblast, 2001
