= Dormition Cathedral, Kharkiv =

Dormition Cathedral
- Собор Успіння Пресвятої Богородиці
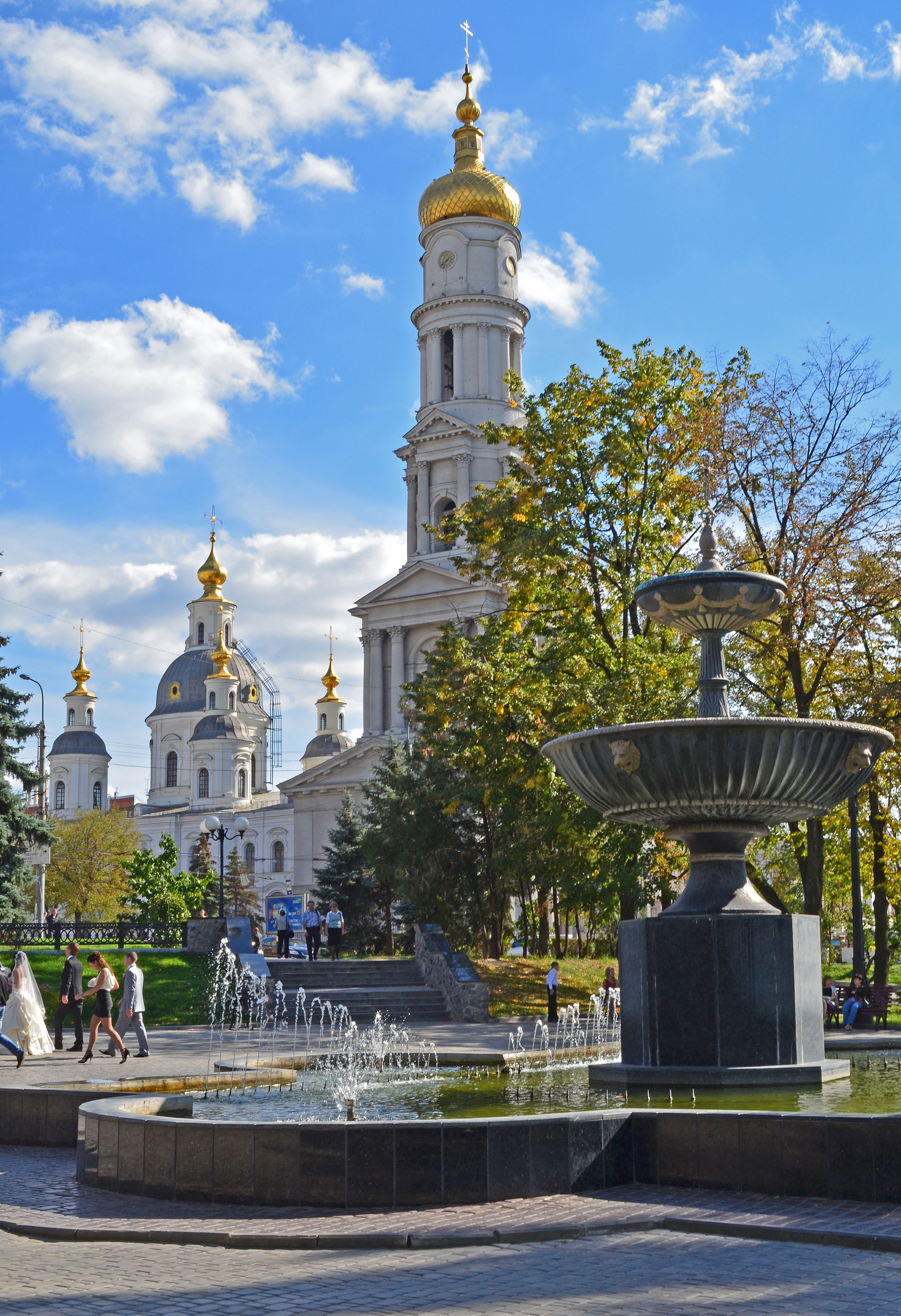
- Dormition Cathedral
- Location: Kharkiv
- Country: Ukraine
- Denomination: Eastern Orthodoxy

Architecture
- Style: Ukrainian Baroque
- Completed: 1657

Administration
- Diocese: Kharkiv diocese

The Dormition Cathedral (Ukrainian: Успенський собор) is a church in Kharkiv, Ukraine. It was the city's main Orthodox church until the construction of the Annunciation Cathedral in 1901. The cathedral stands on the University Hill by the bank of the Lopan River and dominates the entire downtown. The Neoclassical cathedral bell tower, built in the 1820s and 1830s to a height of 90 m (300 ft), remained the tallest building in the city until the 21st century. The cathedral is the only building in Kharkiv visited by almost all Emperors of Russia, starting with Catherine the Great.

== History ==
=== 17th century ===
In 1656 when the Kharkiv Fortress was rebuilt most of its territory was given to the citizens to build their houses. The northern part of the district was given for construction of the future church. It is first mentioned in a 1658 military report of the voivode Ofrosimov, who wrote to Moscow about shipments of wood for the construction. That church was austere and only had paper icons. Research of later centuries discovered multiple human remains near the church that proves it had its own cemetery nearby.

Kharkiv was growing rapidly and by 1685 the city authorities started construction of the stone Dormition Church. The old wooden church was preserved as a small chapel. By 1687 the new building was ready. Its outlook and design were reminiscent the Ascension Cathedral in Izium, presumably built by the same crew. The Dormition Church was consecrated in 1688 by the Belgorod Metropolitan Archbishop Avramiy. It became one of the first stone buildings in the city.

=== 18th century ===
On March 3, 1733, Kharkiv suffered the most disastrous fire in its history. It destroyed more than 300 households with all buildings, all shops, ruined the St Nicholas church and almost burned down the Dormition Church. Only its walls remained intact while all the interiors, the roof and domes were destroyed. However, by 1734 the church was restored.

In 1770 dangerous cracks were found in the church walls that could not be repaired. On May 14, 1771, a cornerstone for the new cathedral was laid. The design of the future building was inspired by the St Clement's Church in Moscow. In Spring 1778 the altar was consecrated in honor of Our Lady of Kazan, though the construction was not completed yet. On September 27, 1780, it was reconsecrated in honor of the Dormition of the Mother of God. The ceremony was attended by the general Pyotr Rumyantsev.

The cathedral was built when the pompous Baroque style was going out of fashion and was gradually replaced by classicism. The eclectic combination of those styles showed itself in the cathedral. It boasted a gilded icon screen, carved from limewood to Rastrelli's Rococo design, in Baroque fashion and at the same time the facades were reserved and strict.

=== 19th century ===
According to Filaret Gumilevsky, the free-standing Alexander Bell Tower was built in the aftermath of Napoleon's expulsion from Russia "to express the people's gratitude to Alexander I". The cornerstone was laid on August 2, 1821. The main altar was consecrated on November 5, 1833. On October 1, 1841, the gilded cross crafted by Moscow master Lukinov was installed on the bell tower.

The tower used to be the second tallest building in Ukraine after the Great Lavra Bell Tower. The seat of the local bishop was moved from the older Intercession Cathedral to the Dormition Church in 1846. A large French clock was installed in the bell tower in 1856. Overall, more than 110,000 rubles were spent on the construction.

=== 20th century ===
In 1924 the bell tower as the highest building of the city was used to install an antenna for the first Soviet radio station. Later the transmission device was moved inside, and the frescoes were significantly damaged. During the 1920s, the church wooden altar was moved to Kharkiv Art Museum, where it burned during the World War II. The authorities closed the cathedral on February 17, 1930. All five domes were destroyed, the bells were removed from the tower. The building was used as a warehouse, then it was given to the city administration offices.

The belfry was further damaged by a tornado in 1975. The cathedral was restored in the late 1970s and reverted to the Ukrainian Orthodox Church in 2006. The local bishopric shares it with a philharmonic society which had a Rieger–Kloss organ installed in the building back in 1986.

=== 21st century ===
On March 2, 2022, during the Russian invasion of Ukraine, a Russian missile hit the church while civilians were hiding from the bombings.

== Gallery ==
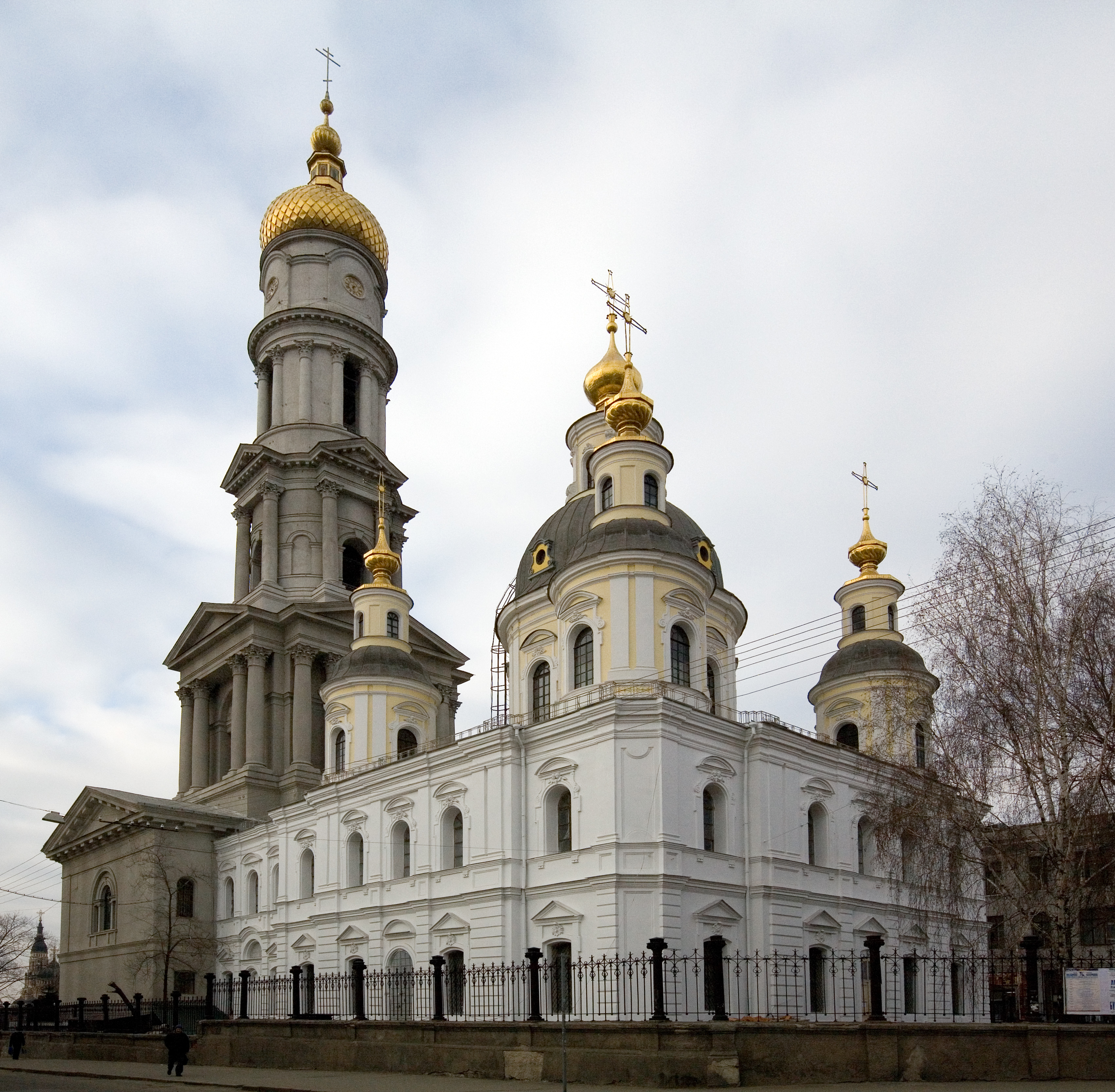
Side view, 2008

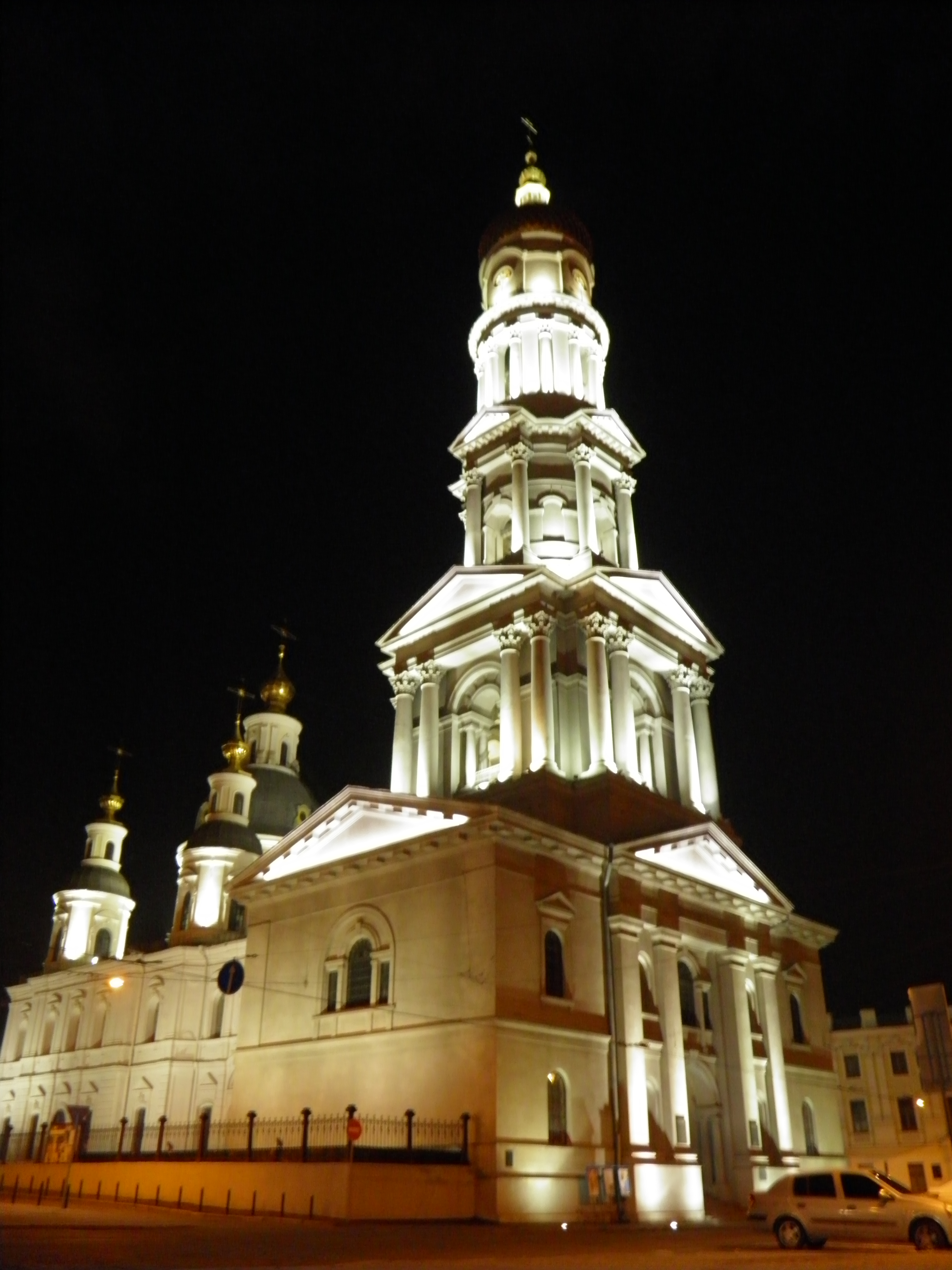
The bell tower in the night, 2014

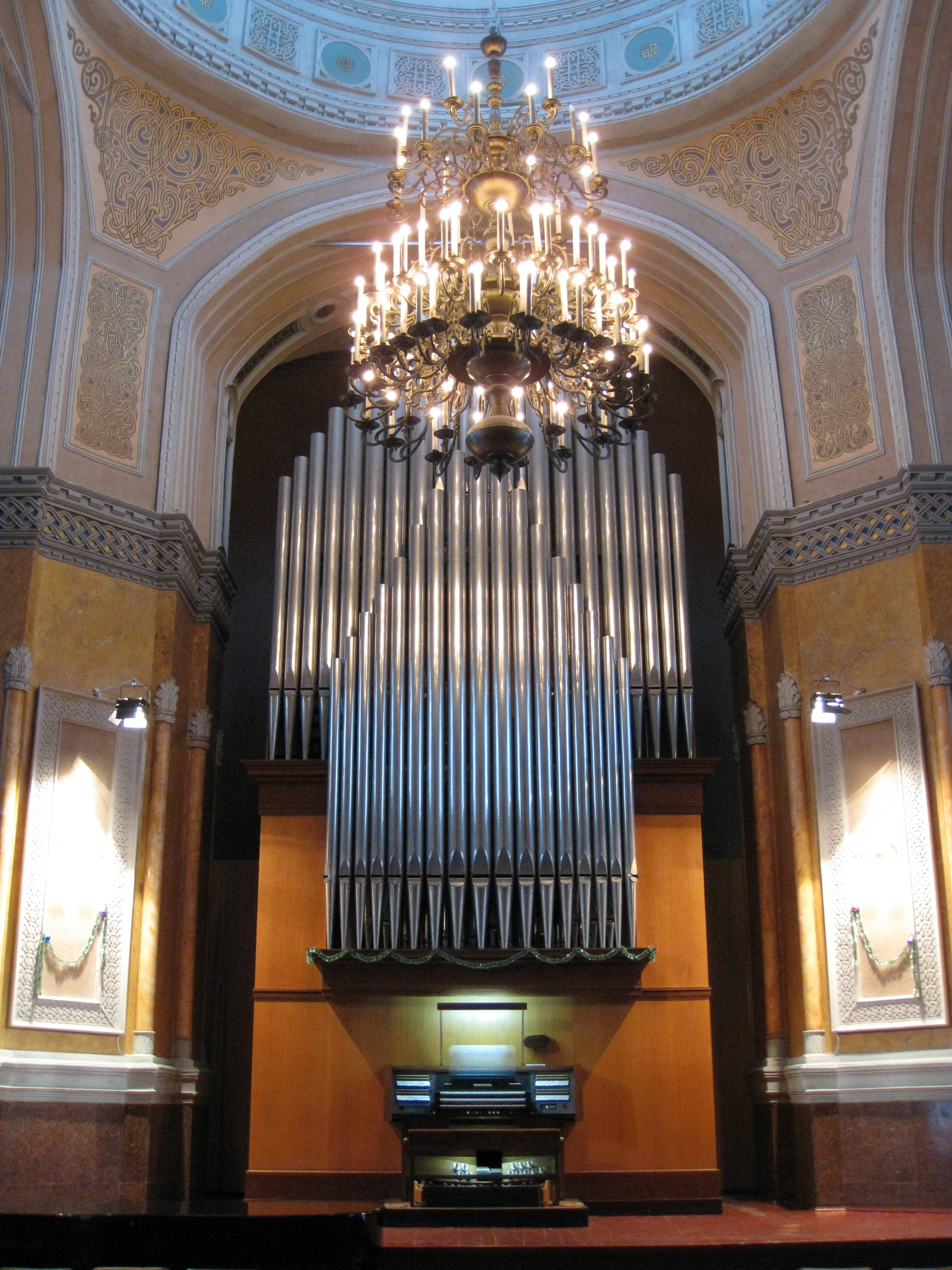
The pipe organ in 2009

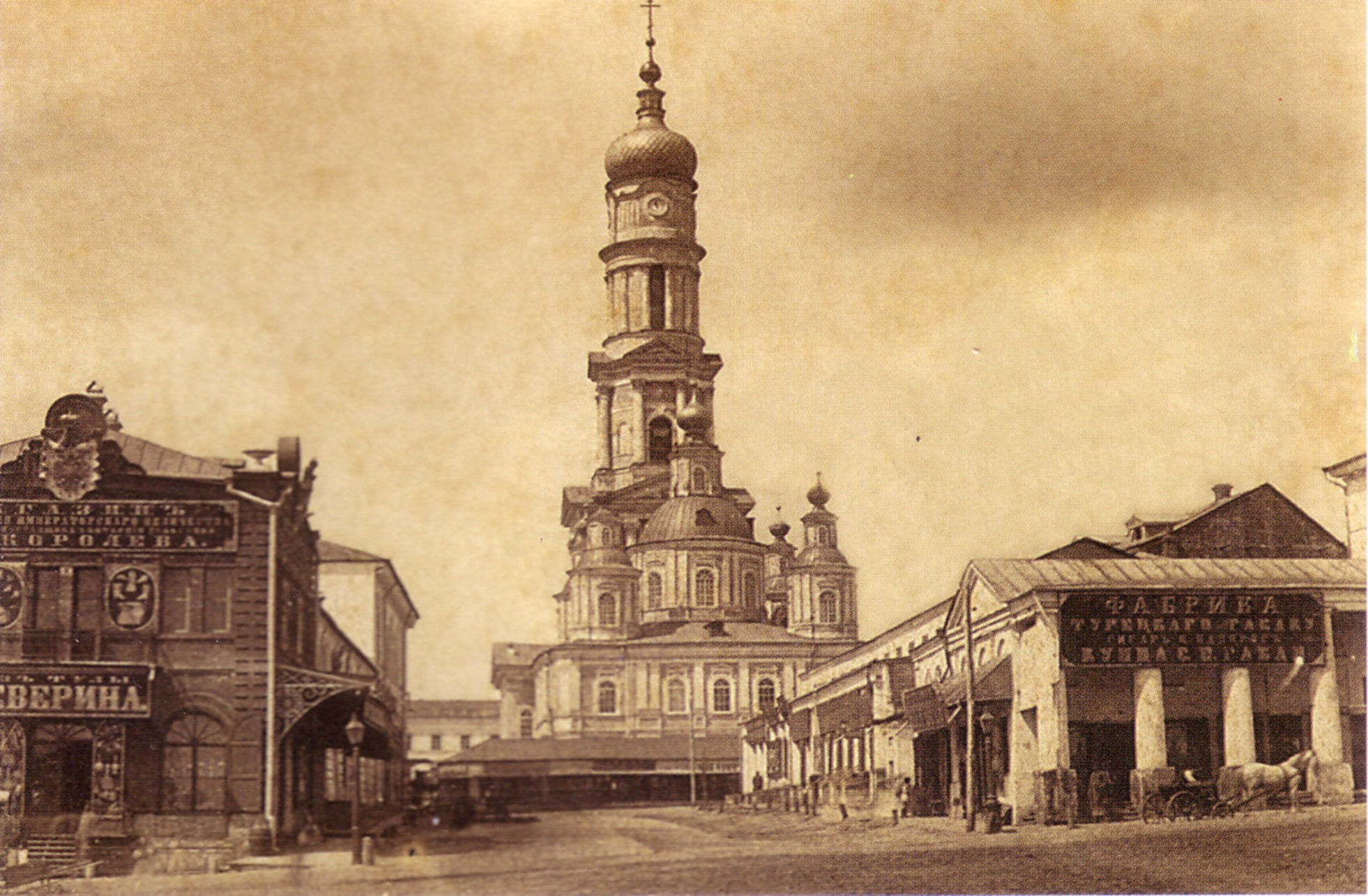
View from Moskovskaya str., 1860

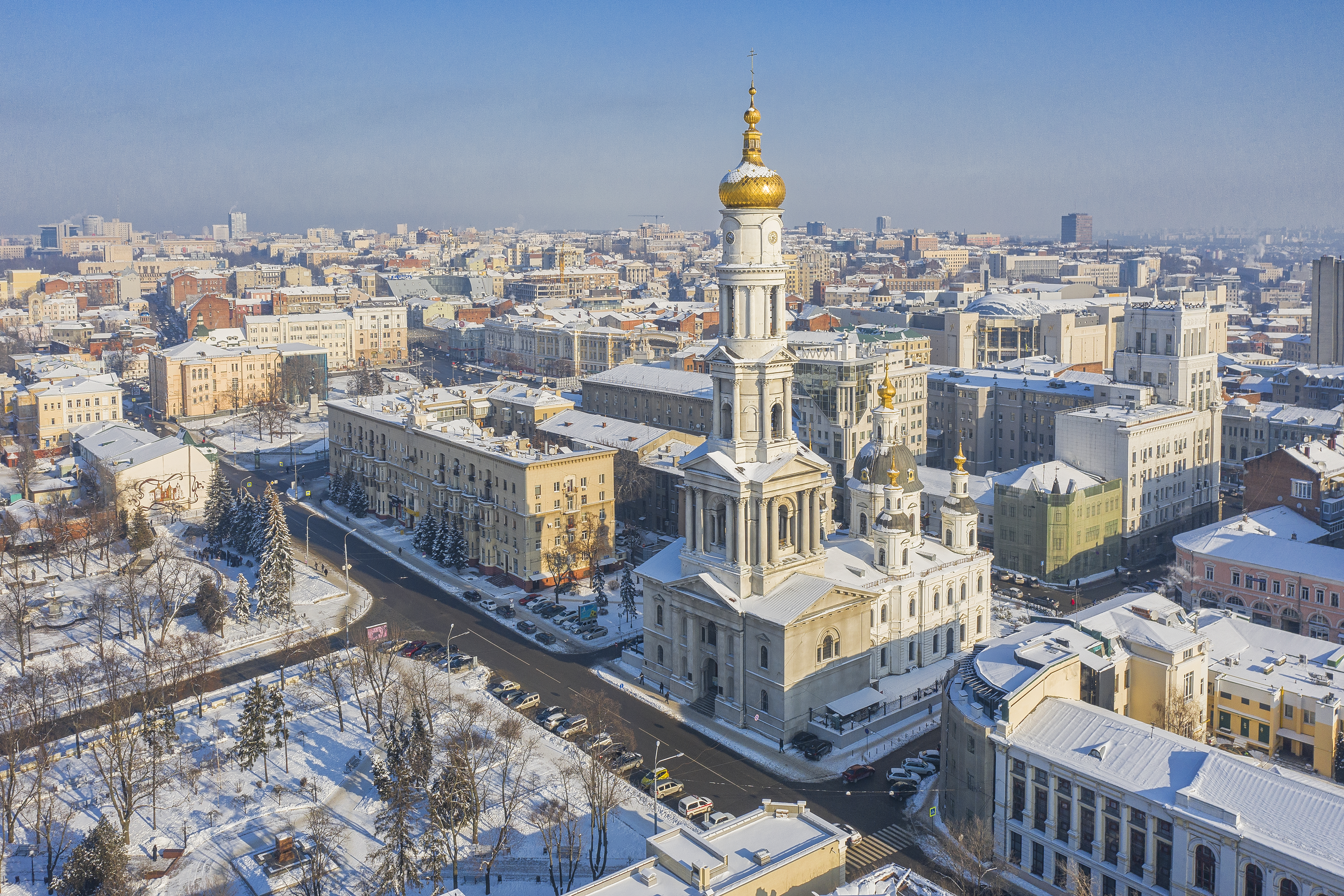
Aerial photo, 2021

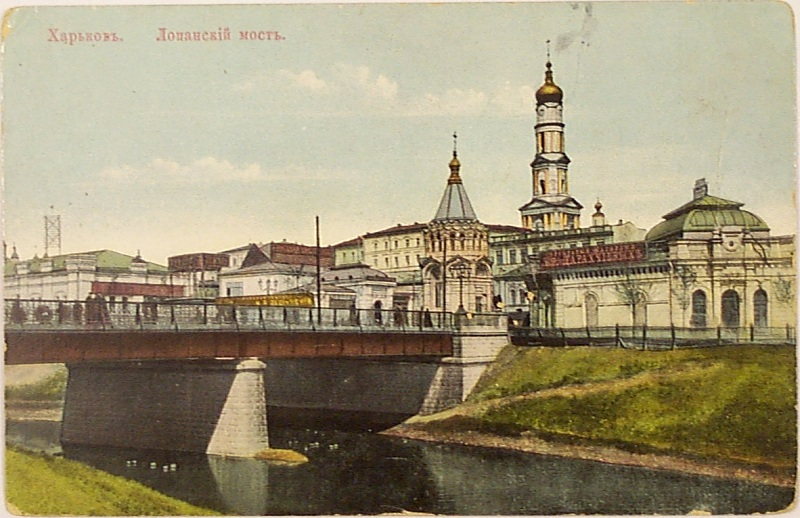
Lopanskyi bridge and the cathedral in the 1900s

== See also ==
- Annunciation Cathedral, Kharkiv
- List of tallest Orthodox churches
- List of tallest structures built before the 20th century

== Sources ==
- Novogorodov, V. E. (1990). Золотой венец старого Харькова : Успенский собор — памятник архитектуры XVIII века [Old kharkiv crown of gold: Dormition Cathedral as a historical monument of XVIII century]. Minsk: Prapor publishing house. p. 7. ISBN 5-7766-0206-8.
- Riedin, E. K. (2006). Церкви города Харькова [Churches of Kharkiv] (in Russian). Minsk: Saga. p. 18. ISBN 9789662918069.
- Leibfried, A. U.; Polyakova, J. J. (1998). Харьков. От крепости до столицы: Заметки о старом городе [Kharkiv from fortress to capital:] (in Russian). Kharkiv: Folio. ISBN 966-03-0276-2.
- Kaliberda, Sergey (2016). Органы: от Киевской Руси до Украины [Pipe organs from Kievan Rus' to Ukraine] (in Russian). Moscow: Center of Humanitarian Initiatives. p. 581. ISBN 978-5-98712-609-7.
- Paramonov, Andrey (2020). Улицы старого Харькова [Streets of old Kharkov] (in Russian). Glagoslav Publications. ISBN 9789660384132.
