= Annunciation Cathedral, Kharkiv =

Orthodox church in Kharkiv, Ukraine

Coordinates: 49°59′25″N 36°13′27″E

Annunciation Cathedral
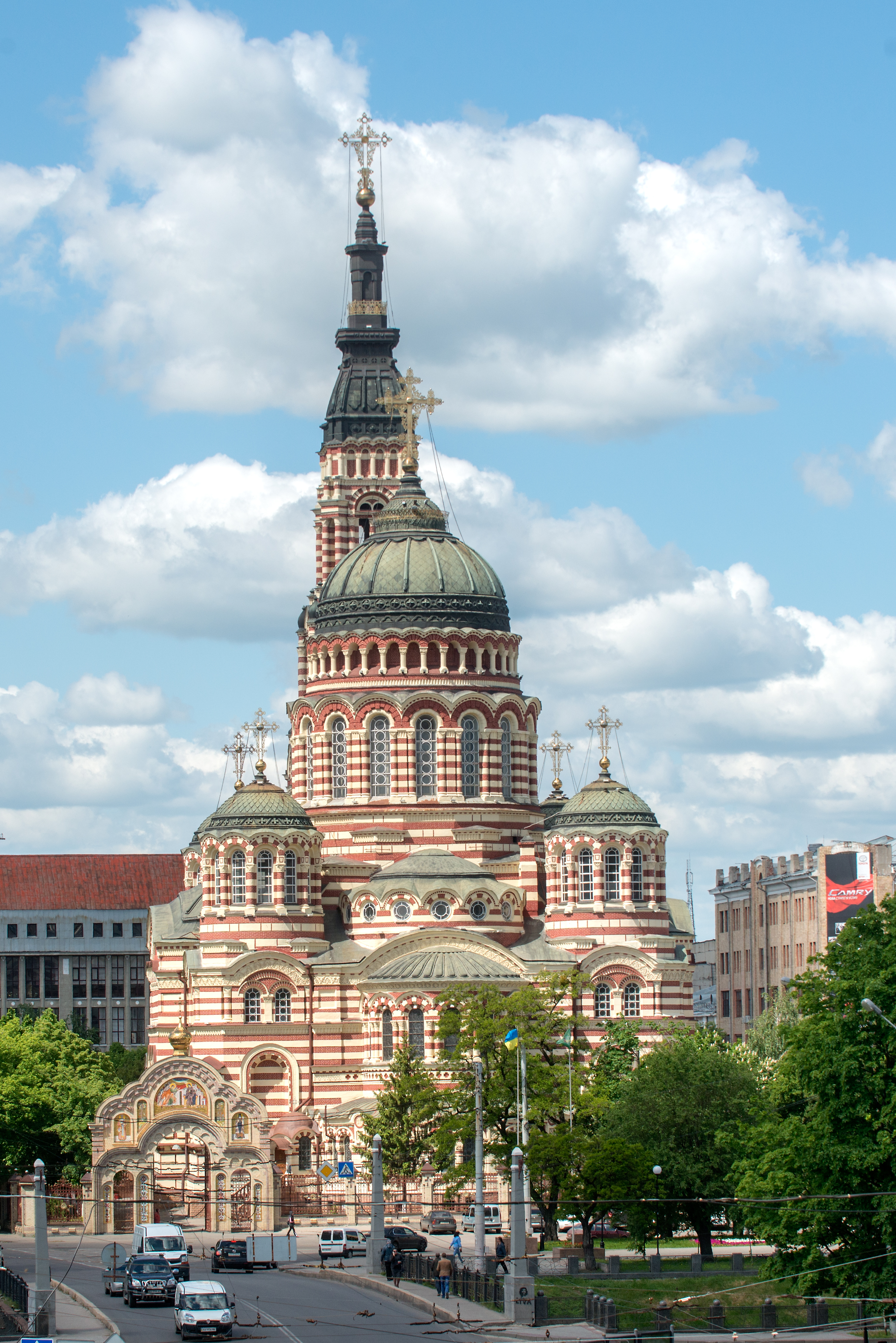
- The Annunciation Cathedral
- Annunciation Cathedral
- Country: Ukraine
- Denomination: Ukrainian Orthodox Church (Moscow Patriarchate)

Architecture
- Years built: 1888–1901

Specifications
- Height: 80 m

Immovable Monument of Local Significance of Ukraine
- Official name: «Благовіщенський собор» (Annunciation Cathedral)
- Type: Urban Planning, Architecture
- Reference no.: 7364-Ха

The Annunciation Cathedral (Ukrainian: Свято-Благовіщенський кафедральний собор, romanized: Sviato-Blahovishchenskyi kafedralnyi sobor) is the main Orthodox church of Kharkiv, Ukraine. The pentacupolar Neo-Byzantine structure with a distinctive 80-meter-tall bell tower was completed on 2 October 1888, from designs by a local architect, Mikhail Lovtsov. The church was consecrated in 1901, and the earlier Annunciation church was then pulled down.

The candy-striped cathedral supplanted the older Assumption Cathedral as the main church of Kharkiv and was one of the largest and tallest churches of the Russian Empire. The icon screen used to be of Carrara marble. The church was frescoed in a style derived from St Volodymyr's Cathedral in Kyiv. On 3 July 1914 the church became recognized as the city's cathedral.

The cathedral was closed to worshippers in 1930, but it was reopened during the German occupation in 1943. The church was then in the hands of the Ukrainian Autocephalous Orthodox Church and harbored a school, though claims abound that it was later used as a warehouse.

Since 1946 the cathedral has been the seat of the Kharkiv and Bohodukhiv eparchy of the Ukrainian Orthodox Church (Moscow Patriarchate), while the Intercession Convent has served as the bishop's residence. The Ecumenical Patriarch Athanasius III and several saintly bishops are buried in the cathedral.

On 23 January 2024 the cathedral was damaged by a Russian rocket attack on Kharkiv, during the Russian invasion of Ukraine.

== See also ==
- List of largest Eastern Orthodox church buildings
- Neo-Byzantine architecture in the Russian Empire
