= Intercession Cathedral, Kharkiv =

Intercession Cathedral
- Pokrovskyi Cathedral
- Собор Покрови Пресвятої Богородиці
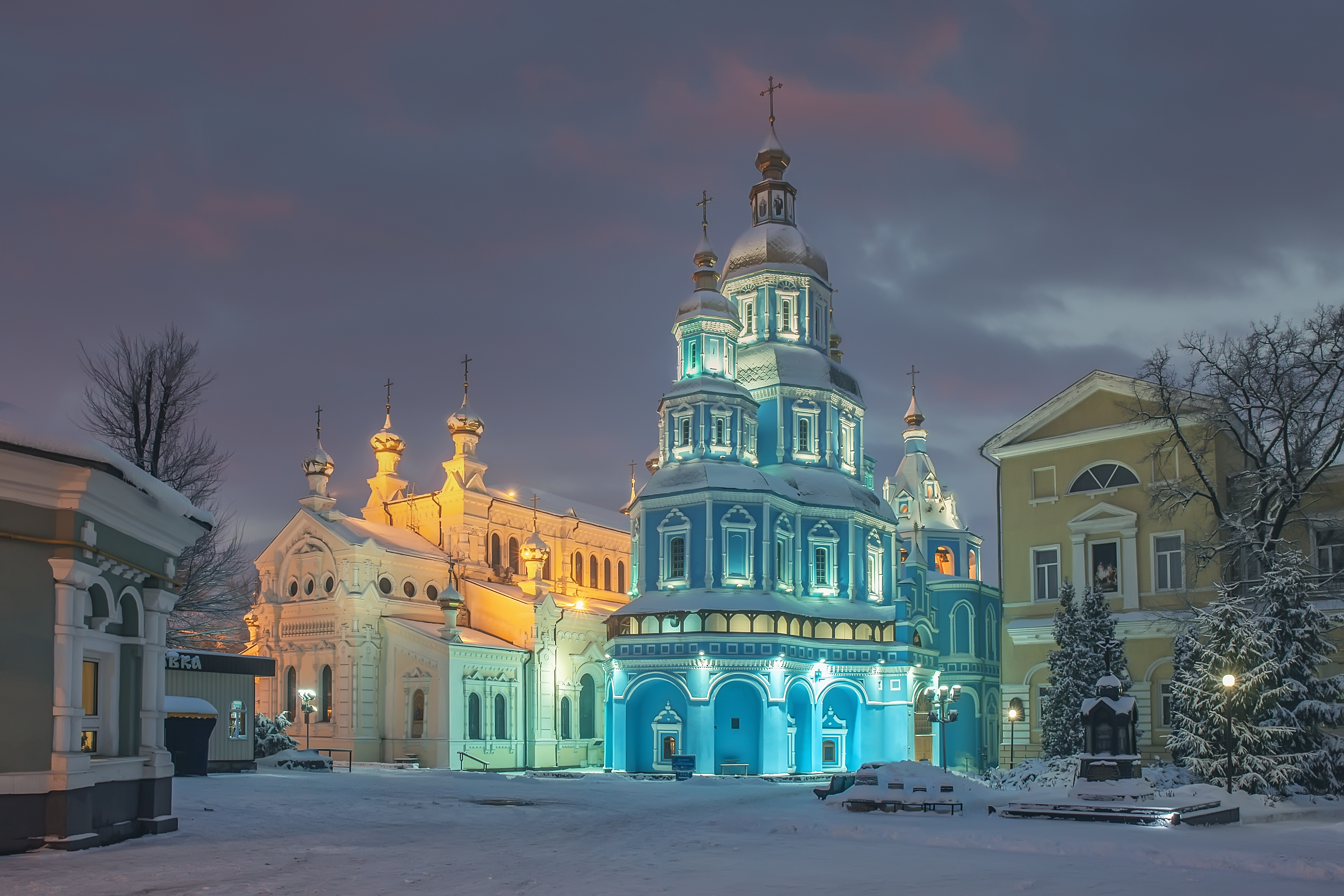
- The cathedral in 2020
- Intercession Cathedral
- Location: Kharkiv
- Country: Ukraine
- Denomination: Eastern Orthodox church

Architecture
- Style: Ukrainian Baroque
- Years built: 1659-1689
- Completed: 1689

Immovable Monument of Local Significance of Ukraine
- Official name: «Покровський монастир» (Intercession Monastery)
- Type: Urban Planning, Architecture
- Reference no.: 7450-Ха

The Intercession Cathedral (Ukrainian: Собор Покрови Пресвятої Богородиці) or Pokrovskyi Cathedral (Покровський собор) is the oldest cathedral in Kharkiv, Ukraine, built in 1689. In addition to the cathedral, the monastery complex includes the seminary, Kharkiv episcopal residence, and the Church of the Mother of God Ozerianska.

== History ==
The first wooden church was built in the first half of the 17th century and consecrated in the honour of Intercession of the Theotokos. In 1659 local Cossacks decided to construct a stone temple. It was finished by 1689 and consecrated by the bishop Abraham Ukhov. The stone church was designed in a traditional Russian way — three-domed basilica placed on a warm ‘winter’ temple. The upper part was connected to the bell tower with a narthex gallery.

In 1726 the bishop Epiphanius Tikhorsky and the field marshal Mikhail Mikhailovich Golitsyn established the Intercession Monastery, Kharkiv. The monastery complex included a collegium, the first higher education establishment in Kharkiv.

The Intercession Church was restored in 1729 and equipped with new church ware. In 1732 the bell tower received a 1.6 tonne new bell. In 1799—1846 the church had a status of a cathedral. It was closed in the 1920s and decayed for more than 30 years. In 1992 it was returned under management of the Ukrainian Orthodox Church.

== Gallery ==
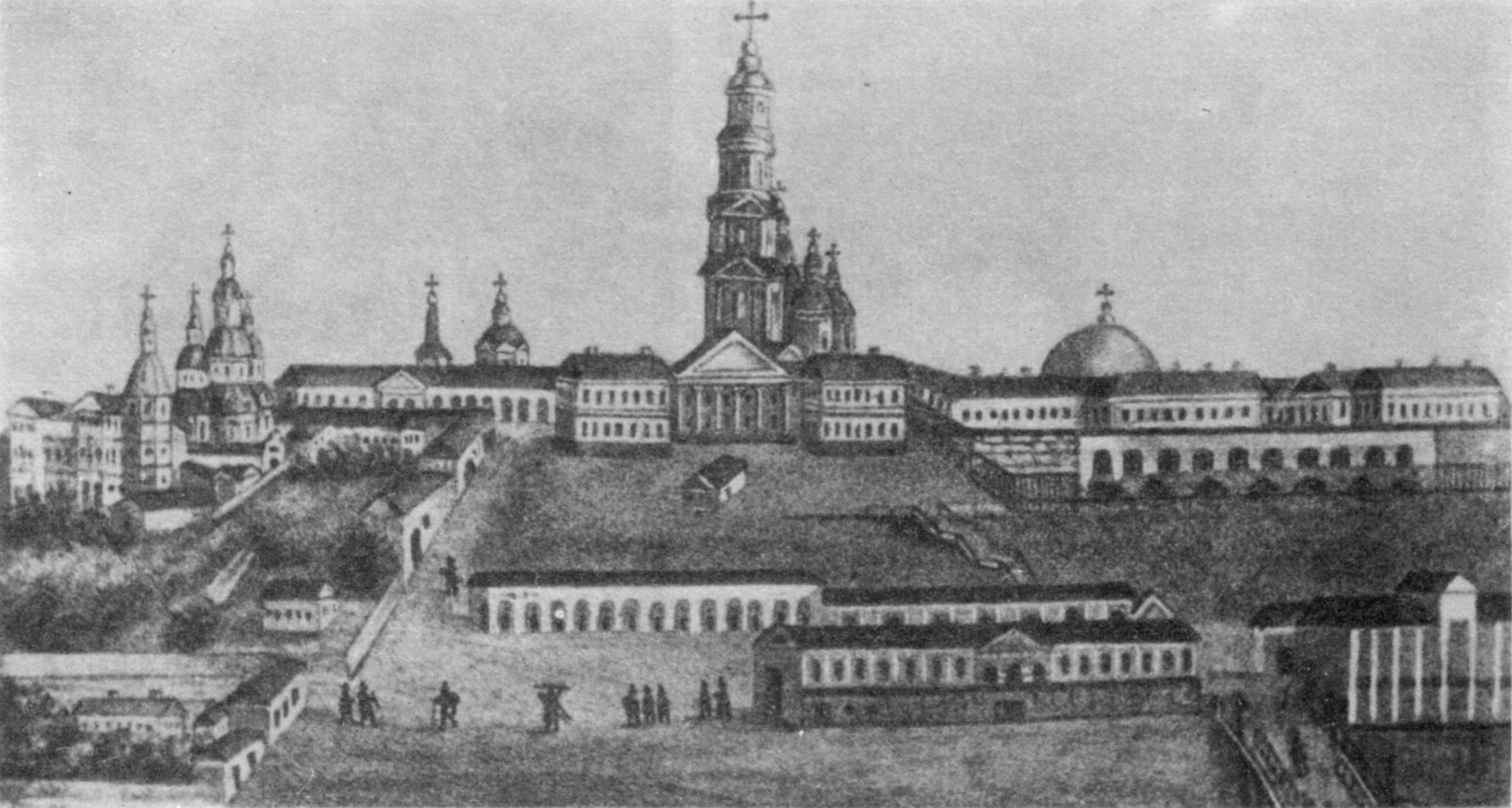
Engraving from the 1840s

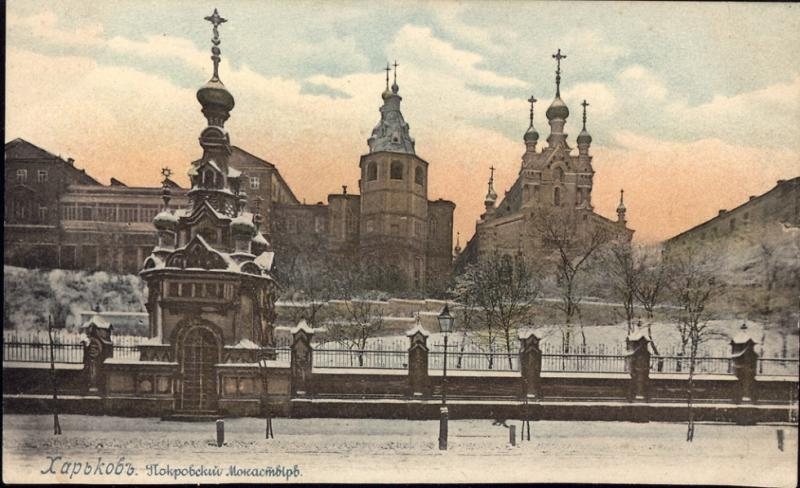
Postcard from the 1910s

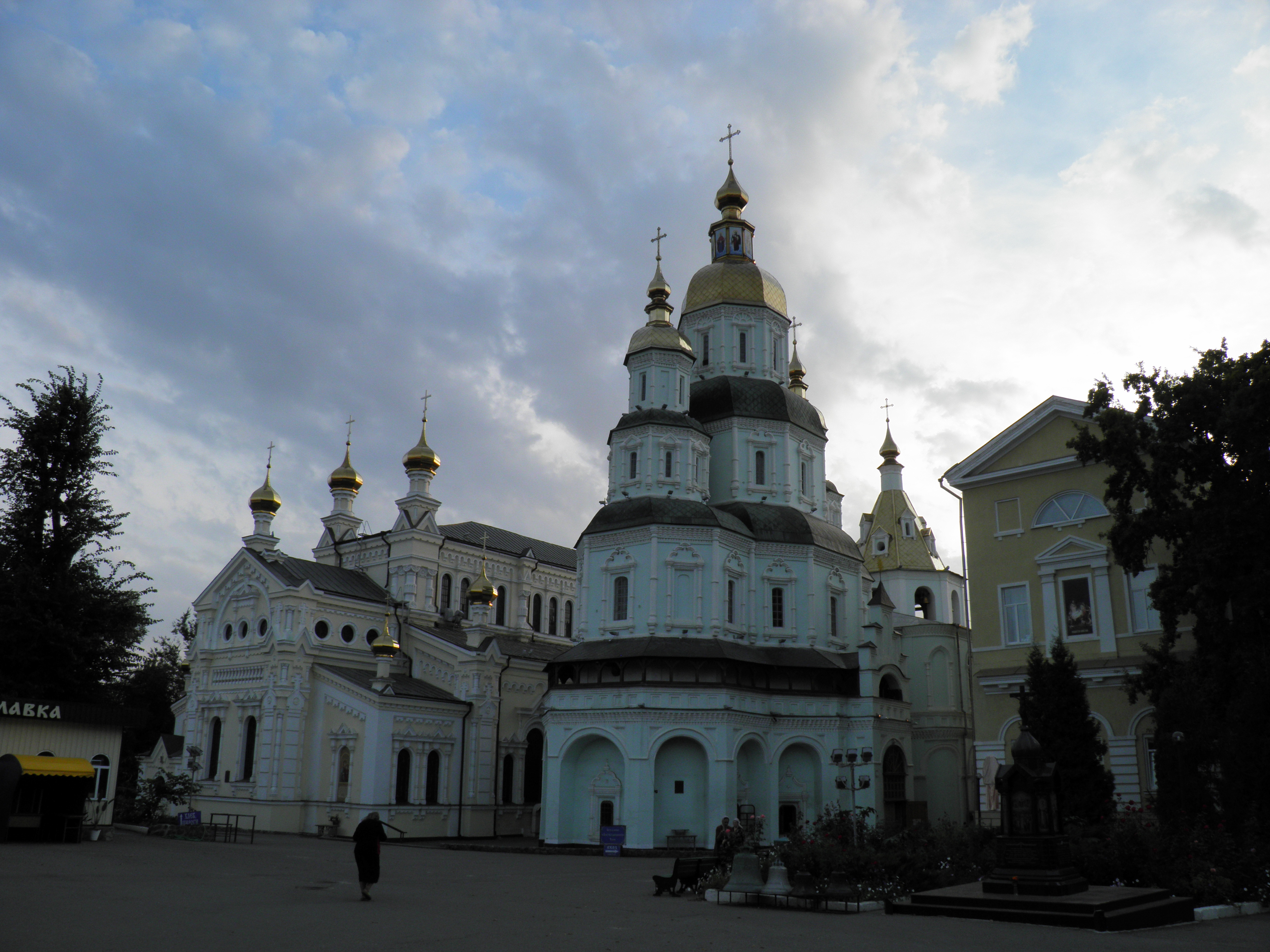
The monastery in 2016

== Sources ==
- Denisov, Leonid (2019). 1100 православных монастырей Российской империи [1100 Orthodox monasteries of Russian Empire]. ISBN 9785041532109.
