= House of Cooperation =

- Дім Кооперації
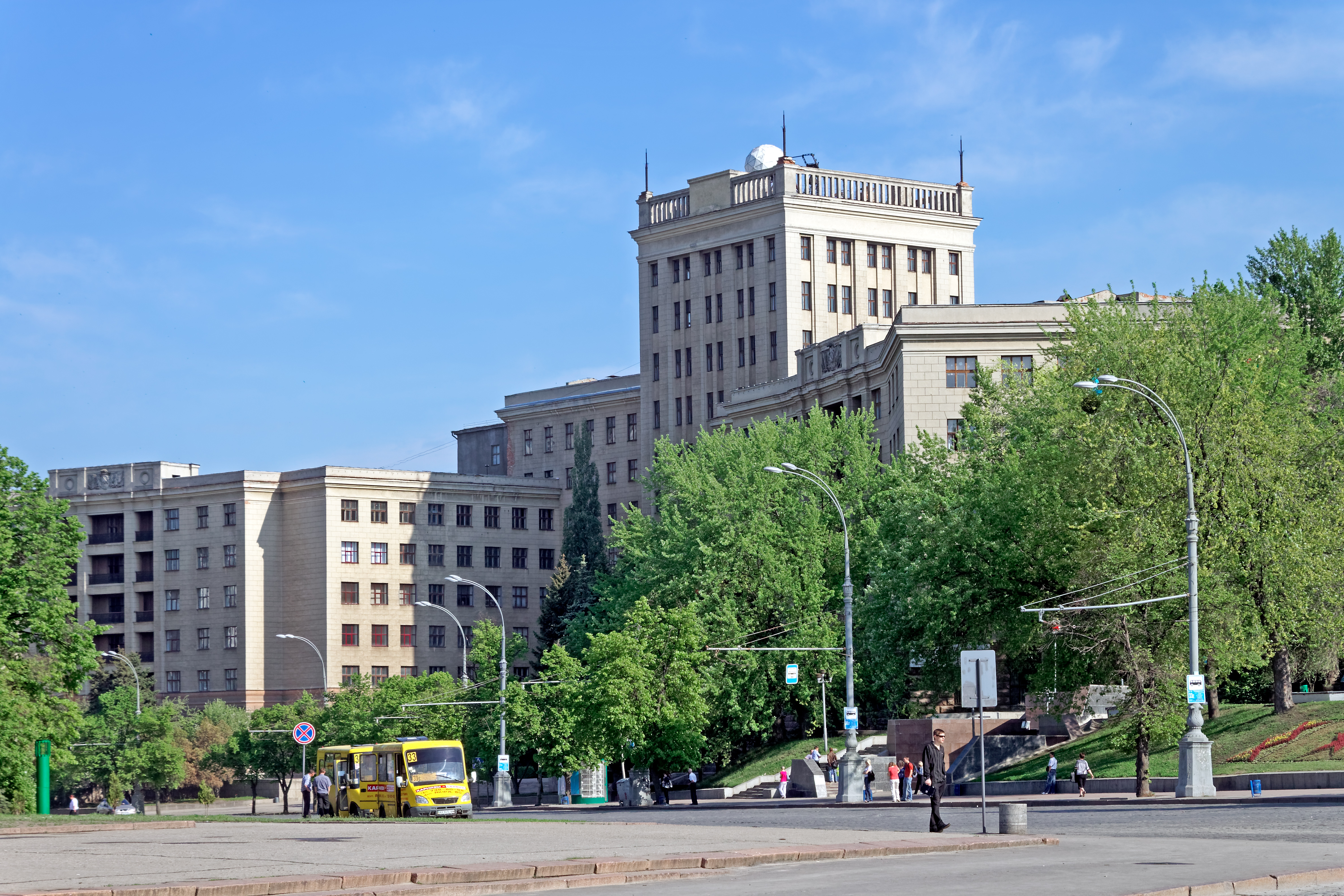
- General view of the building
- Interactive map of the House of Cooperation area

General information
- Architectural style: Stalinist
- Location: 6 Freedom Square, Kharkiv, Ukraine
- Coordinates: 50°00′25″N 36°13′49″E
- Construction started: 1929
- Completed: 1954
- Opened: 1954

Technical details
- Floor count: 12

Design and construction
- Architects: first project: Oleksandr Dmytriiev, Oskar Munz second project: Petro Shpara, M. P. Yevtushenko, Oleksandr Linetskyi

Immovable Monument of Local Significance of Ukraine
- Official name: Будівля Академії ім. Говорова (Building of the Govorov Academy)
- Type: Architecture, Urban Planning
- Reference no.: 7375-Ха

House of Cooperation (Ukrainian: Будинок кооперації) is a building located on Freedom Square in Kharkiv, Ukraine. It is one of the Kharkiv skyscrapers together with Derzhprom and the House of Projects. Currently, the building is used by the VN Karazin Kharkiv National University (as its northern building) and is recognized as an architectural and urban planning monument.

== History ==
The construction started in 1929. The architects were Oleksandr Dmytriiev and Oskar Munz. It was envisaged that the building would follow the constructivist style, but use brick (rather than reinforced concrete that was used in the other Kharkiv skyscrapers), lengthening the construction period. The building was planned to house the Government of the Ukrainian SSR, but later it became the centre of the agricultural administration. In 1934, as a result of the transfer of the capital from Kharkiv to Kyiv, the unfinished building was given to the Academy of Military and Economics (later known as the Govorov Military and Engineering Academy).

The first phase of the construction was finished in the 1930s, and only a third of the building (side sections) was constructed by the beginning of the Eastern Front of World War II. As a result of fighting, the building was partially damaged, though the damage was not as significant as that of the House of Projects across the square. After the end of the war, the construction works resumed, but in the Stalinist Empire style rather than the original Constructivism. The construction finished in 1954 following the project by Petro Shpara, M. P. Yevtushenko, and Oleksandr Linetskyi. According to the new project, the final version of the building would include a central twelve-storey tower and two eight-storey side sections made of brick. A large tower with spires was envisaged above the central section, though it was never constructed.

In 1996, the Academy was reorganized into Kharkiv Military University. In 2004, it was disbanded, and the ownership of the building was transferred to VN Karazin Kharkiv National University. The building now houses a number of faculties, including computer science, medicine, physics and energy, philosophy, and sociology. On 17 November 2019, monuments to the historian Dmytro Bahalii and mathematician Aleksandr Lyapunov, who worked at the university, were unveiled. In 2014, the scientific demonstration center "LandauCenter" was opened in the building, followed next year by the Artistic Gallery named after Henryk Siemiradzki, who studied at the university. On 29 January 2025, a monument to Henryk Siemiradzki was opened near the building.

The building is listed as an architectural and urban planning monument of local significance (protection number 7375-Ха). It was damaged numerous times throughout 2022–2025 during Russian Kharkiv strikes, resulting in broken windows and doors, as well as damaged façades.

== Gallery ==
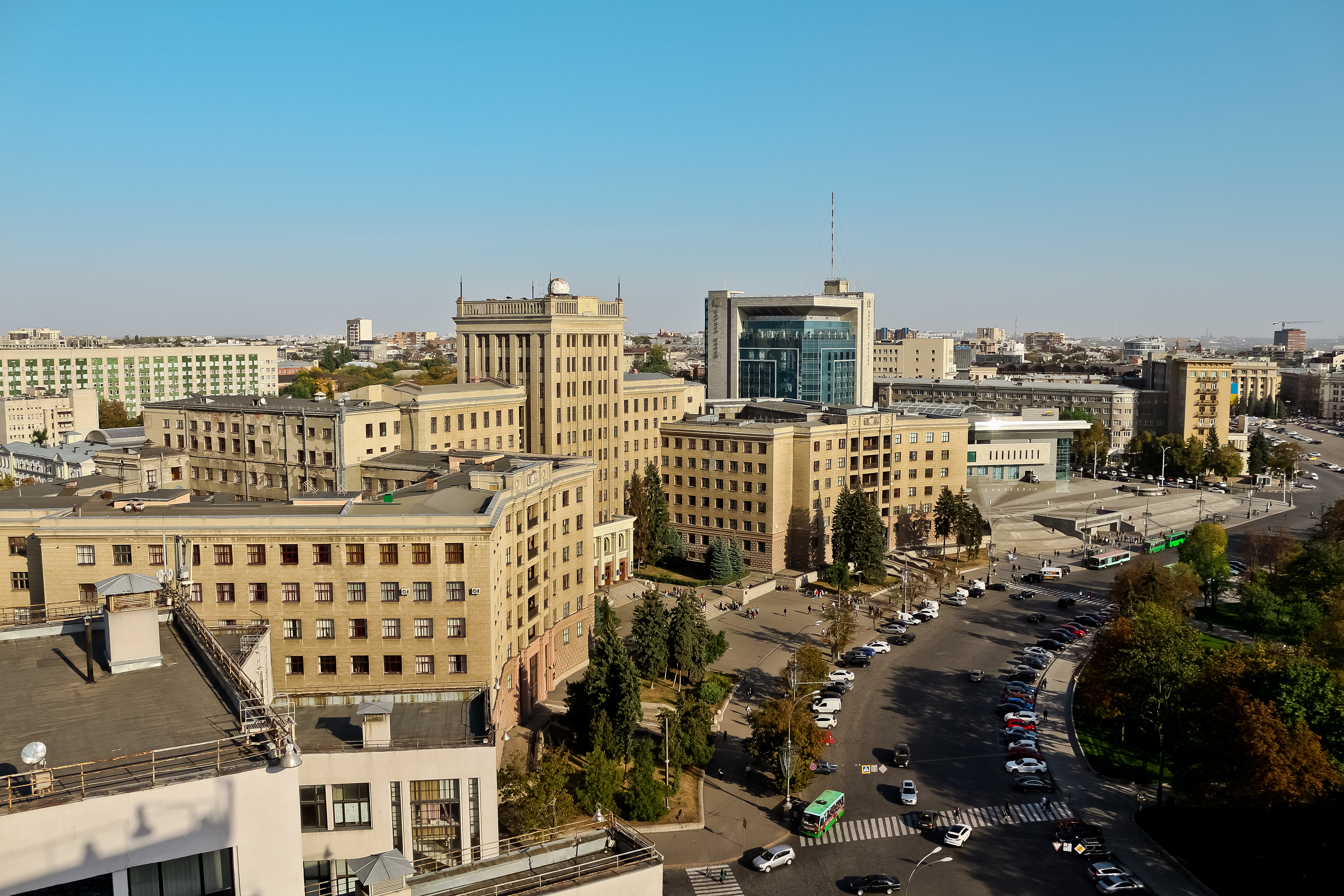
House of Cooperation seen from Derzhprom

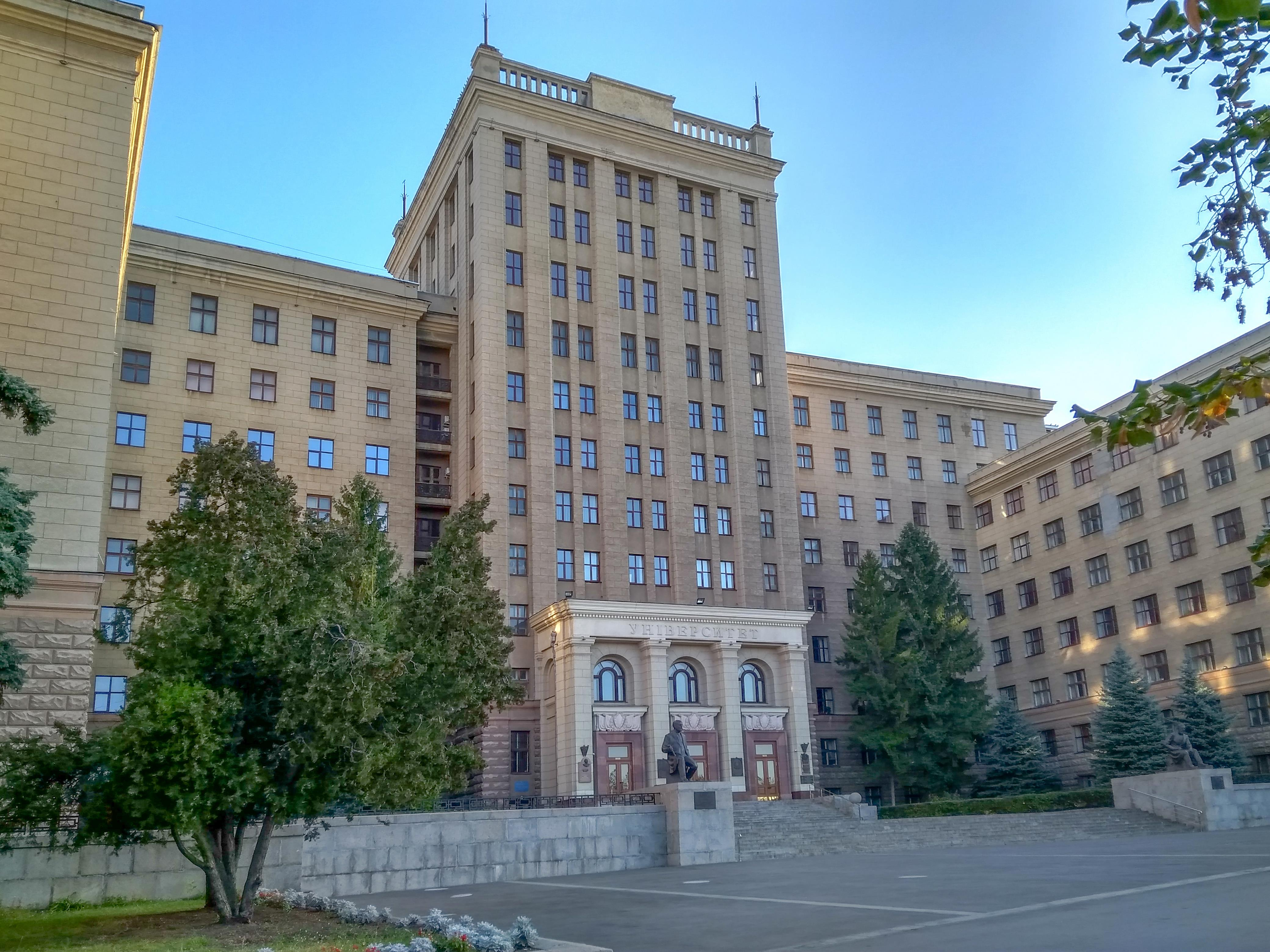
Central section

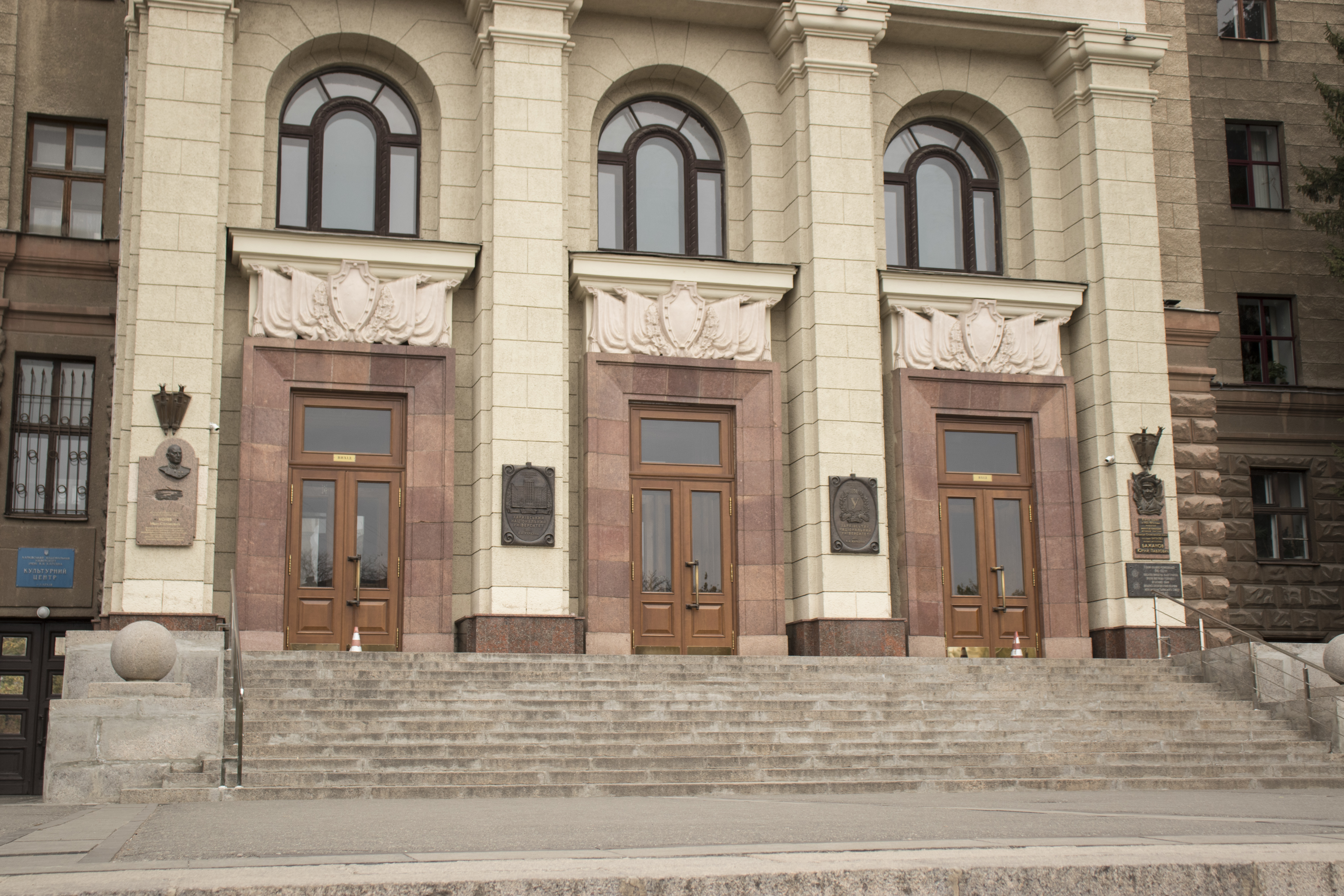
Entrance

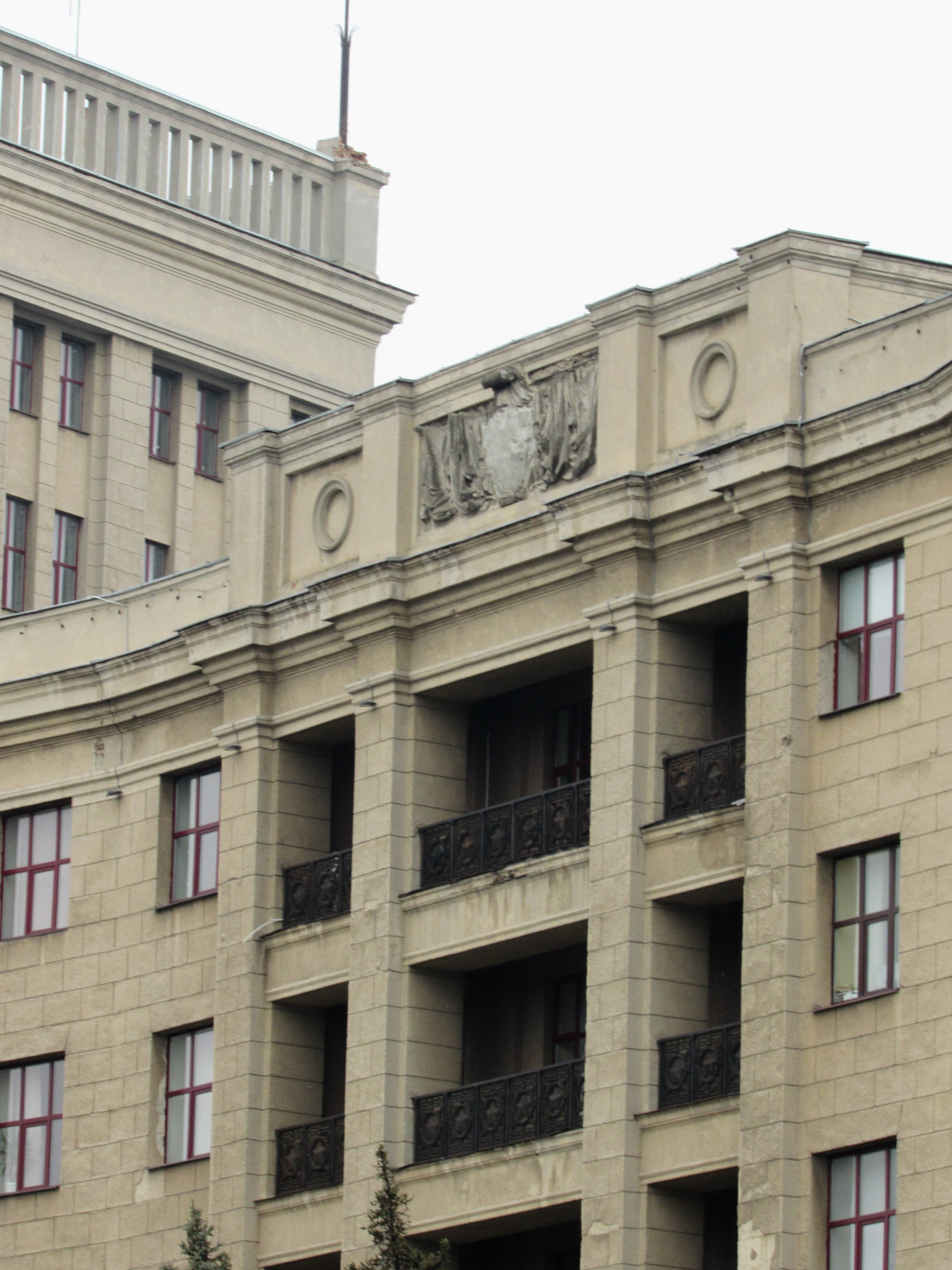
Balconies and escutcheon with flags

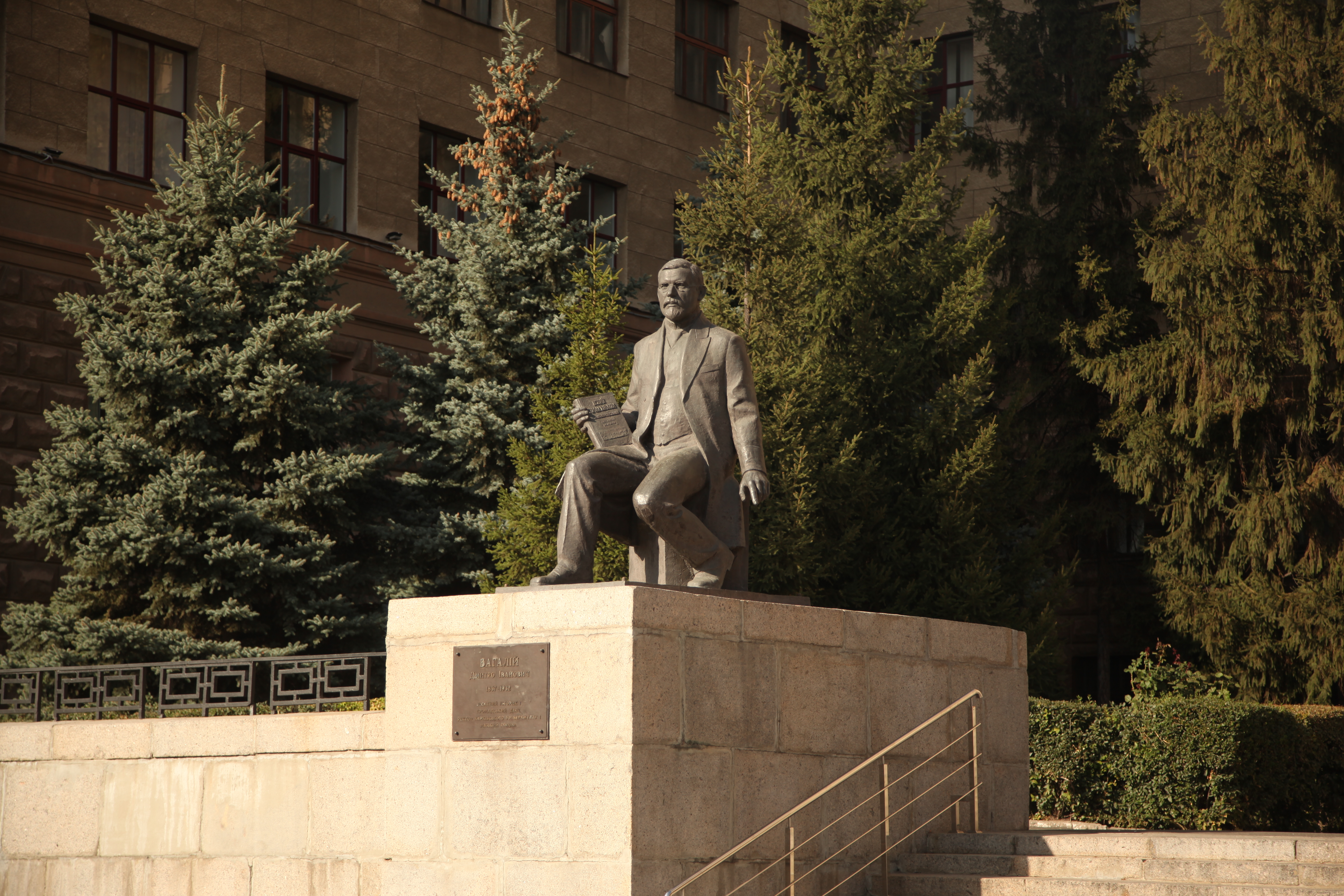
Monument to Dmytro Bahalii

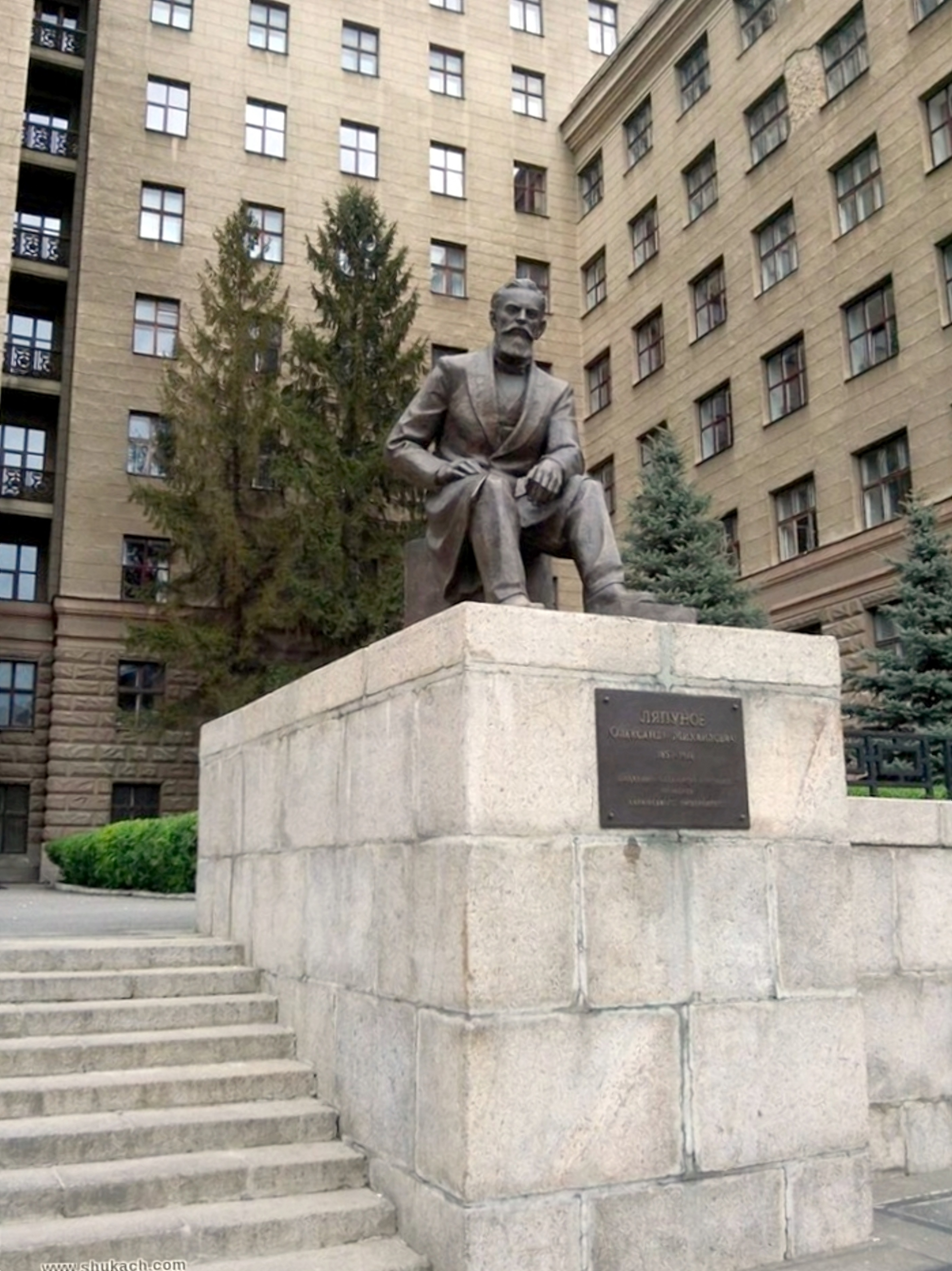
Monument to Aleksandr Lyapunov

== See also ==
- House of Projects
- Derzhprom
- VN Karazin Kharkiv National University
