= House of Projects =

Building in Kharkiv, Ukraine

- Дім Проєктів
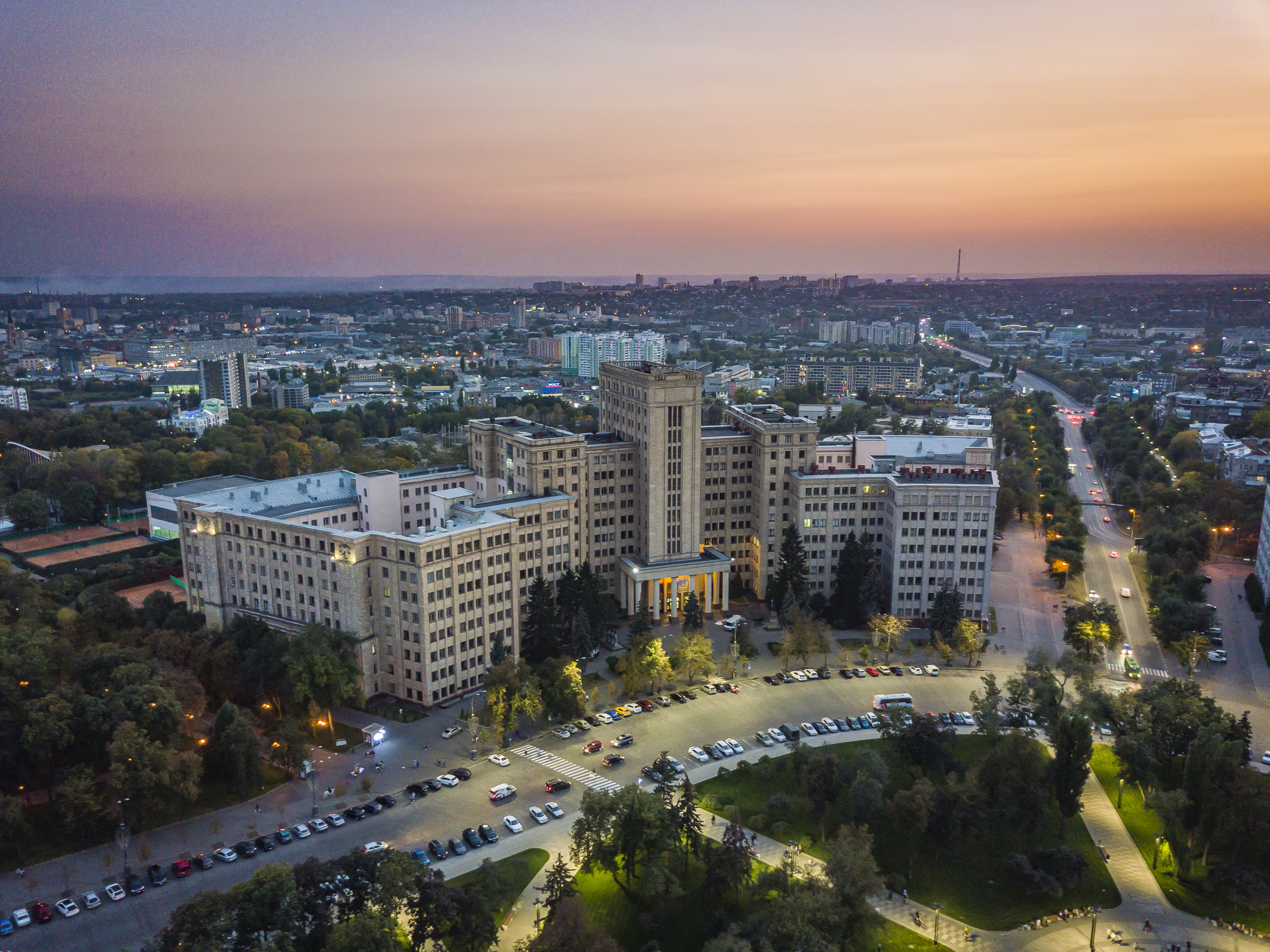
- House of Projects in 2020
- Interactive map of the House of Projects area

General information
- Architectural style: Constructivism (originally), Stalinist (reconstruction)
- Location: Kharkiv, Kharkiv Oblast, Ukraine, Freedom Square, 4
- Coordinates: 50°00′15″N 36°13′40″E
- Groundbreaking: 1930
- Completed: 1932
- Opened: 1933
- Renovated: 1961

Height
- Height: 66 m

Technical details
- Floor count: 14

Design and construction
- Architects: Sergey Serafimov and Maria Zandberg

Renovating team
- Architects: Volodymyr Kostenko and Viktor Lifshyts

Other information
- Number of rooms: 2,500

Immovable Monument of Local Significance of Ukraine
- Official name: «Будівля Держуніверситету /к. Будинок Проектів/» (Building of the State University /former House of Projects/)
- Type: Urban Planning, Architecture
- Reference no.: 7374-Ха

The House of Projects (Ukrainian: Дім Проєктів, romanized: Dim Proiektiv; before 2019 – Дім Проектів, Dim Proektiv) is a building located on Freedom Square in Kharkiv, Ukraine. It is one of the three major buildings of the square together with Derzhprom (House of State Industry) and the House of Cooperation.

== Construction history ==
An all-Union competition for the best design was launched to select the optimal building design. On 5 February 1930, architects Sergey Serafimov and Maria Zandberg won the competition with their project "To Catch Up and Overtake". The Vesnin brothers came in second place, and Kharkiv architects Hryhoriy Yanovytsky and M. L. Mordvynov came in third. All three winning projects evisaged a skyscraper in the constructivist style.

The construction began in 1930. The House of Projects was built, like Derzhprom, from monolithic reinforced concrete, but with wooden floors to save money on the construction. The 14-story building was completed in 1932. Like all Kharkiv skyscrapers, the building had a constructivist architectural style. From its completion to 1954, the House of Projects was the tallest building in Ukraine, with an original height of 68.5 m before reconstruction.

== Usage ==
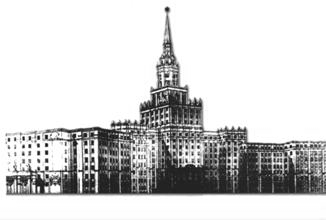
A proposal for the reconstruction of the House of Projects

Originally, the House of Projects was built to house design and construction institutions of the Ukrainian SSR, hence its name.

During World War II, the building was burned down, and the southern wing was destroyed. While it generally survived the war, the building remained closed for 20 years. In 1961, it was completely reconstructed according to the design of architects Volodymyr Kostenko and Viktor Lifshyts, and engineers O. Ivanchenko and V. Dudnik.

A project was also presented for the reconstruction of the skyscraper, which included a building in the style of the Seven Sisters in Moscow. Due to the reconstruction, the building changed greatly and lost its original constructivist style and three-dimensional plasticity.

Since 1957–1963, the House of Projects serves as the main building of the Kharkiv National University. In 2022, it suffered minor damage due to bombing of Kharkiv during the Russian invasion of Ukraine.

== Architecture ==
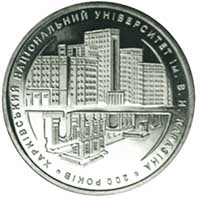
Coin commemorating the 200th anniversary of the university

Many architects believe that Sergey Serafimov succeeded in designing this building much better compared to the completely stripped-down, somewhat brutal forms of Derzhprom.

The House of Projects was more finely worked out in detail. The forms were built on the contrast of the central high-rise dominant, emphasized by vertical glazing slots, and the spatial wings, in which horizontal divisions prevail. The contrast of blank and glazed surfaces, the completion of the central body in the form of a flat "wide" slab, vertical and horizontal through-lights, penetrating rays of the sun on the façade oriented to the north where the side parts adjoin the central one was the appearance of the House of Projects before the war. The building has changed its appearance so significantly after the reconstruction that its original appearance is hardly recognizable.

== Gallery ==
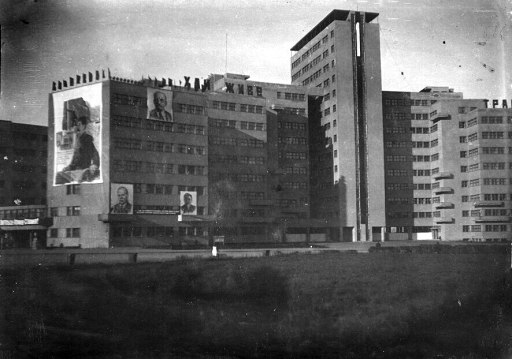
The House of Projects in the 1930s

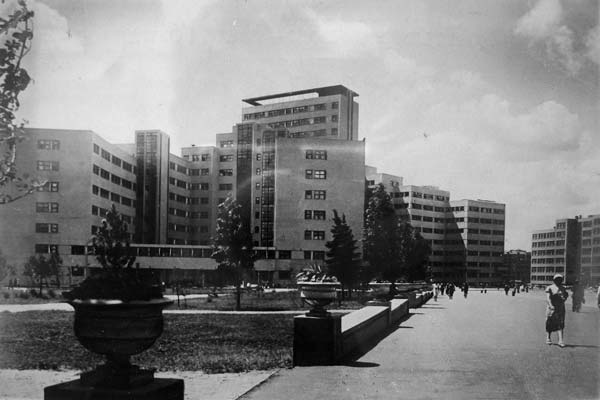

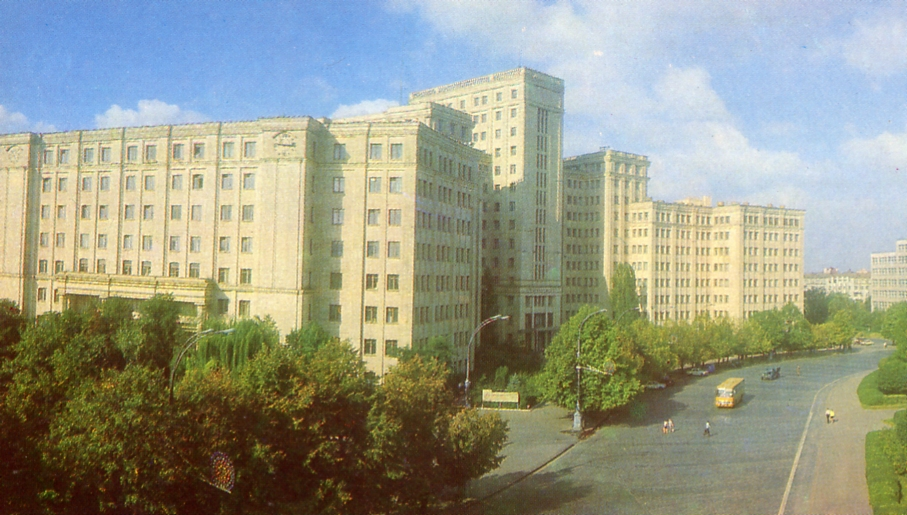
In 1985 after the reconstruction

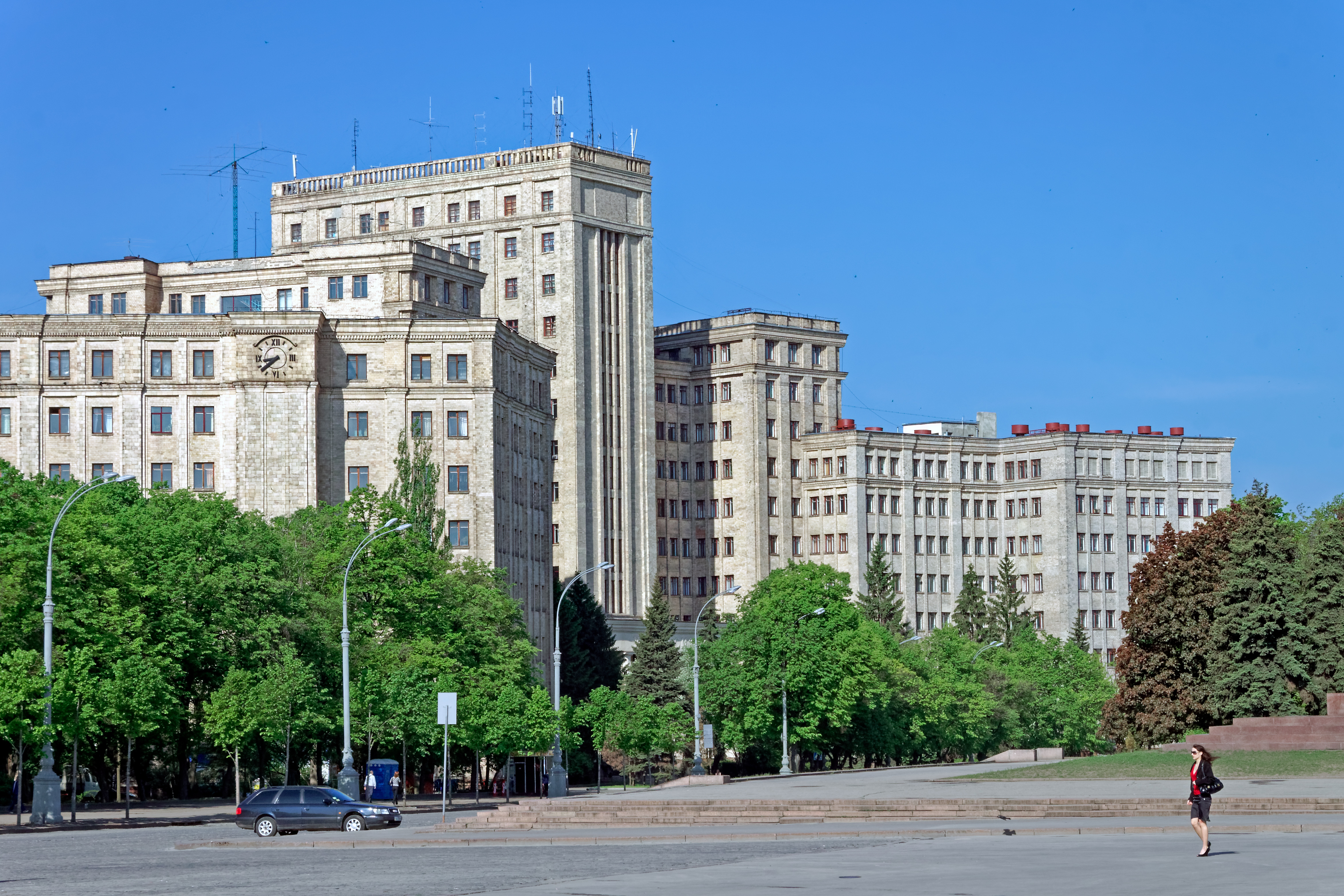
In 2010

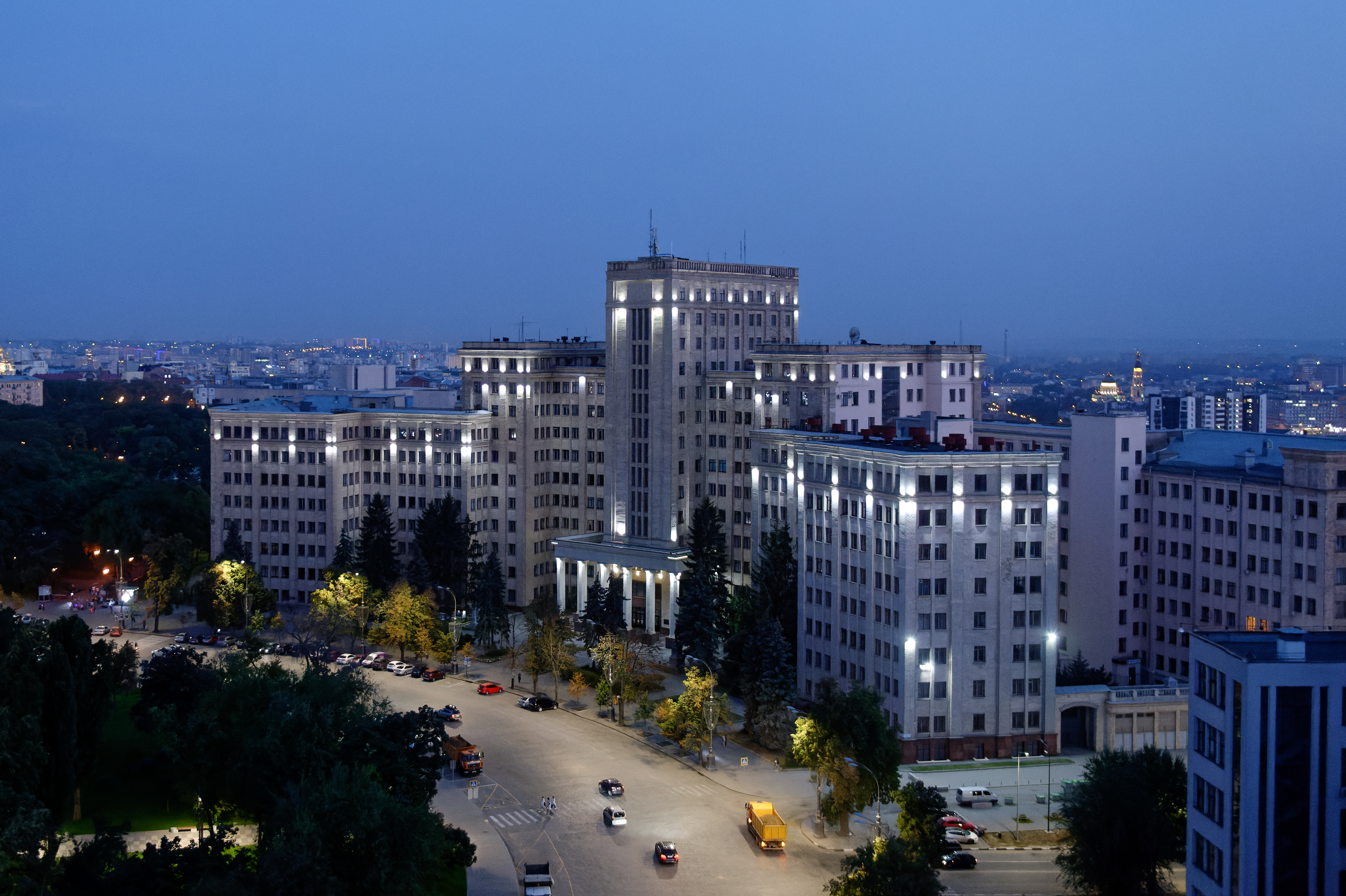
In 2021

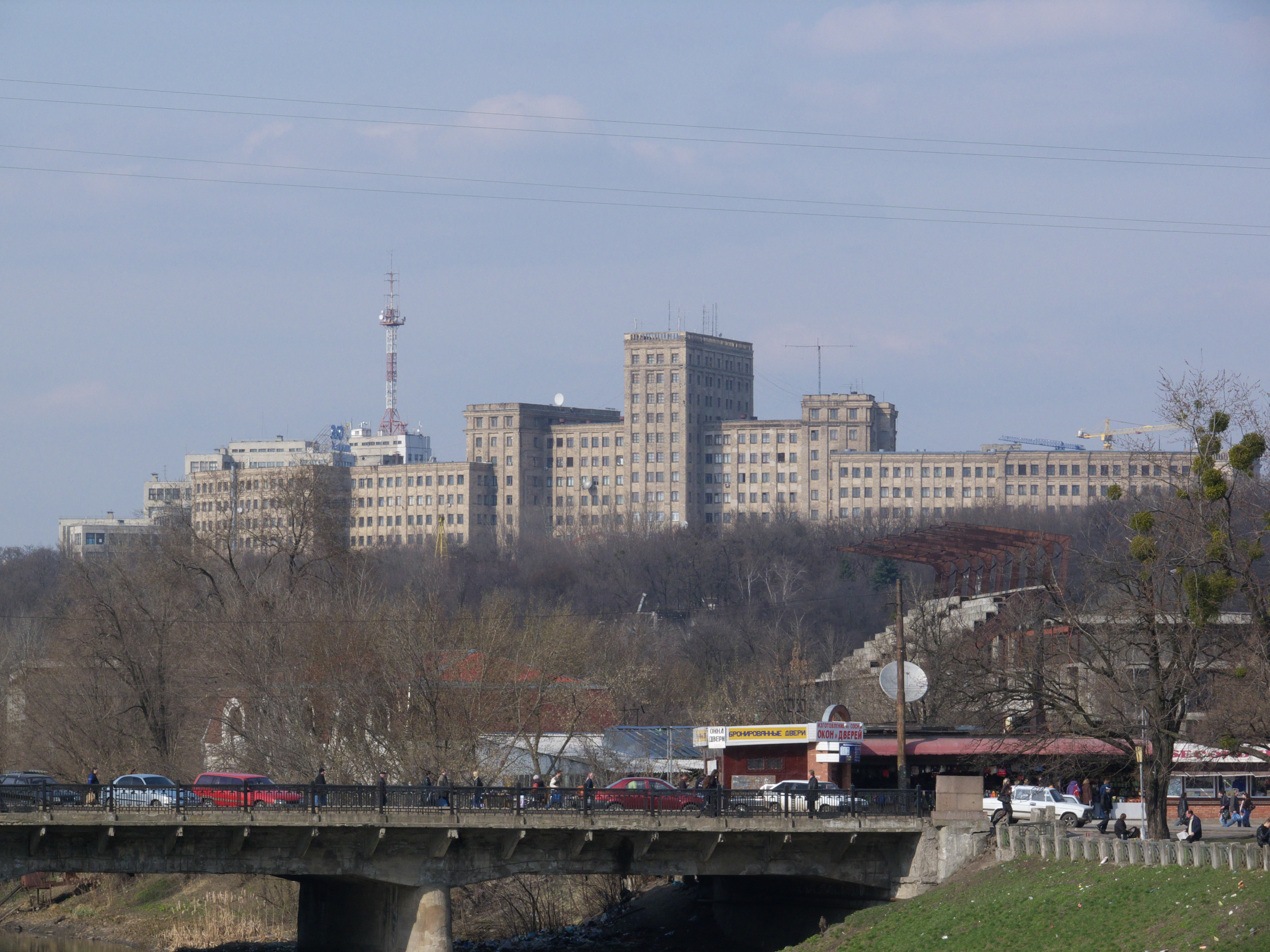
In 2008, view from the Lopan River

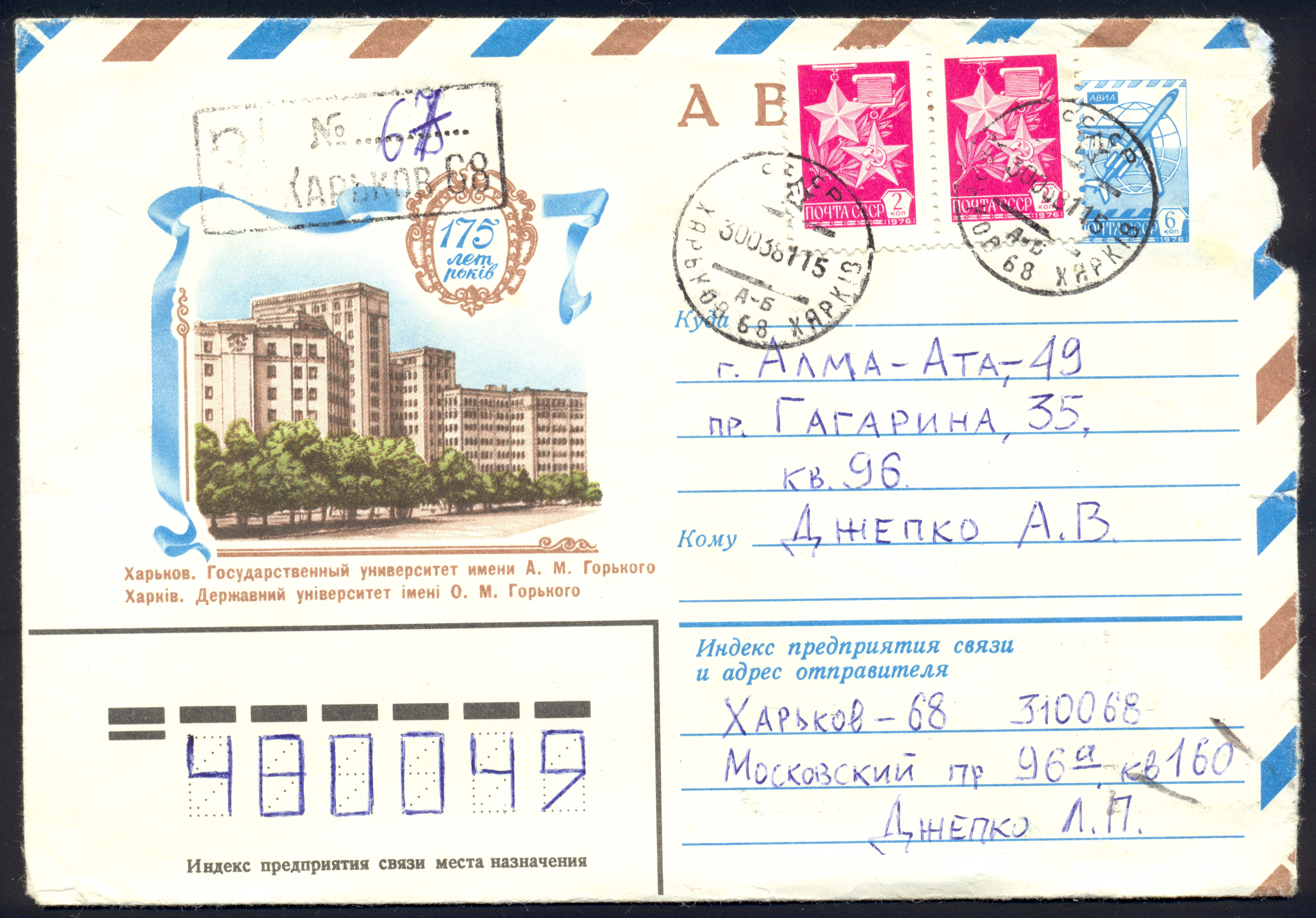
Soviet postage stamp featuring the main building of the Kharkiv National University

== See also ==
- VN Karazin Kharkiv National University
- Derzhprom
- House of Cooperation

== Sources ==
- Архітектура Харкова: держпром
- Дім Проєктів на Skyscraperpage
