= Freedom Square (Kharkiv) =

Public square in Kharkiv, Ukraine

Coordinates: 50°00′16″N 36°14′00″E

Freedom Square Майдан Свободи
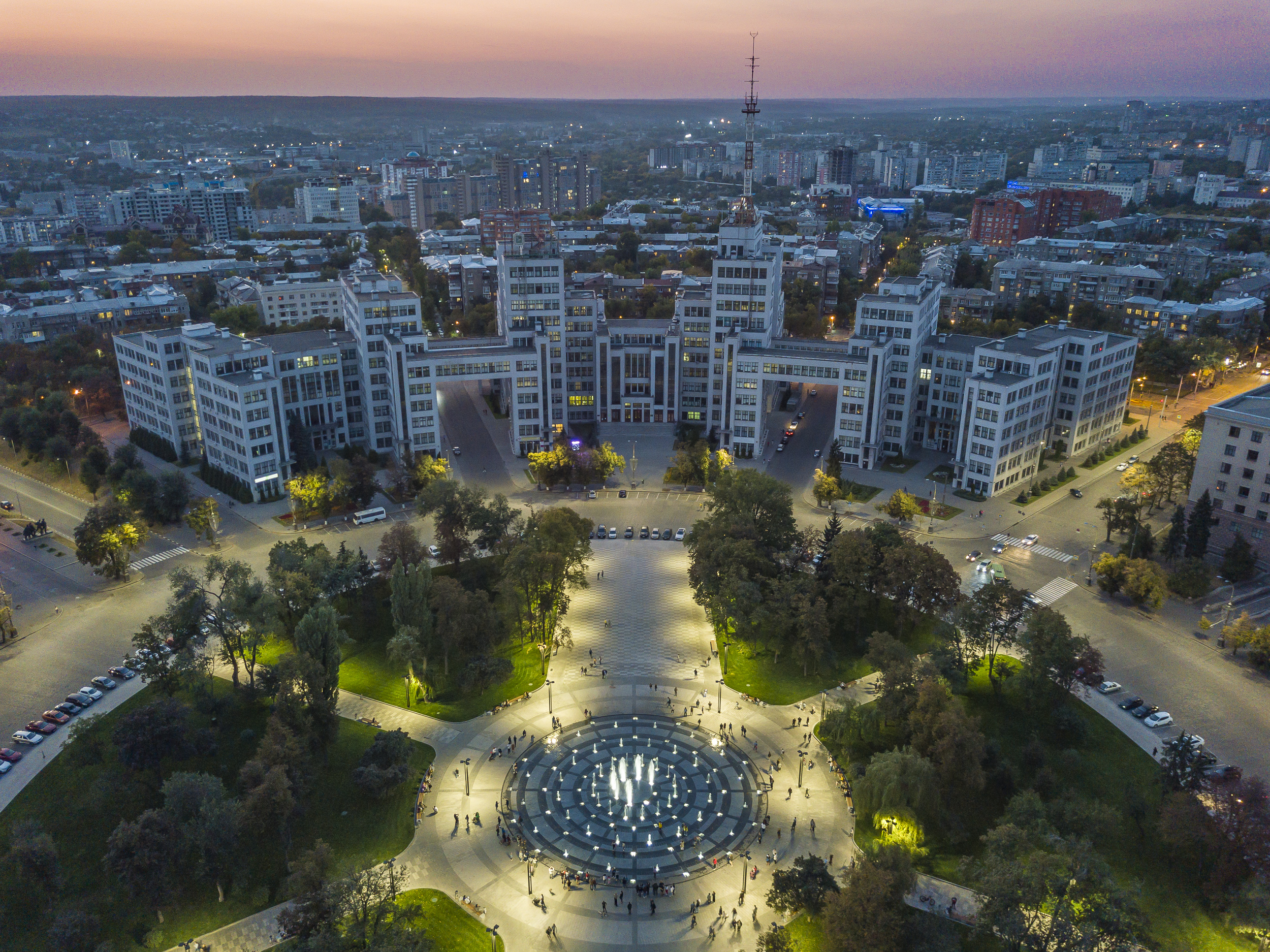
- View of Freedom Square
- Interactive map of Freedom Square; Майдан Свободи
- Location: Kharkiv, Ukraine

Freedom Square (Ukrainian: Майдан Свободи, romanized: Maidan Svobody) is the largest city square in Kharkiv, Ukraine and one of the largest in Europe. The square has two parts: round and rectangular. Three prominent Soviet-era landmarks surround the former section: Derzhprom, the House of Projects, and the House of Cooperation. Numerous protests, parades, and other social events have taken place on Freedom Square.

On 1 March 2022, during the battle of Kharkiv in the Russian invasion of Ukraine, the square and the surroundings were hit by Russian missiles.

== Names ==
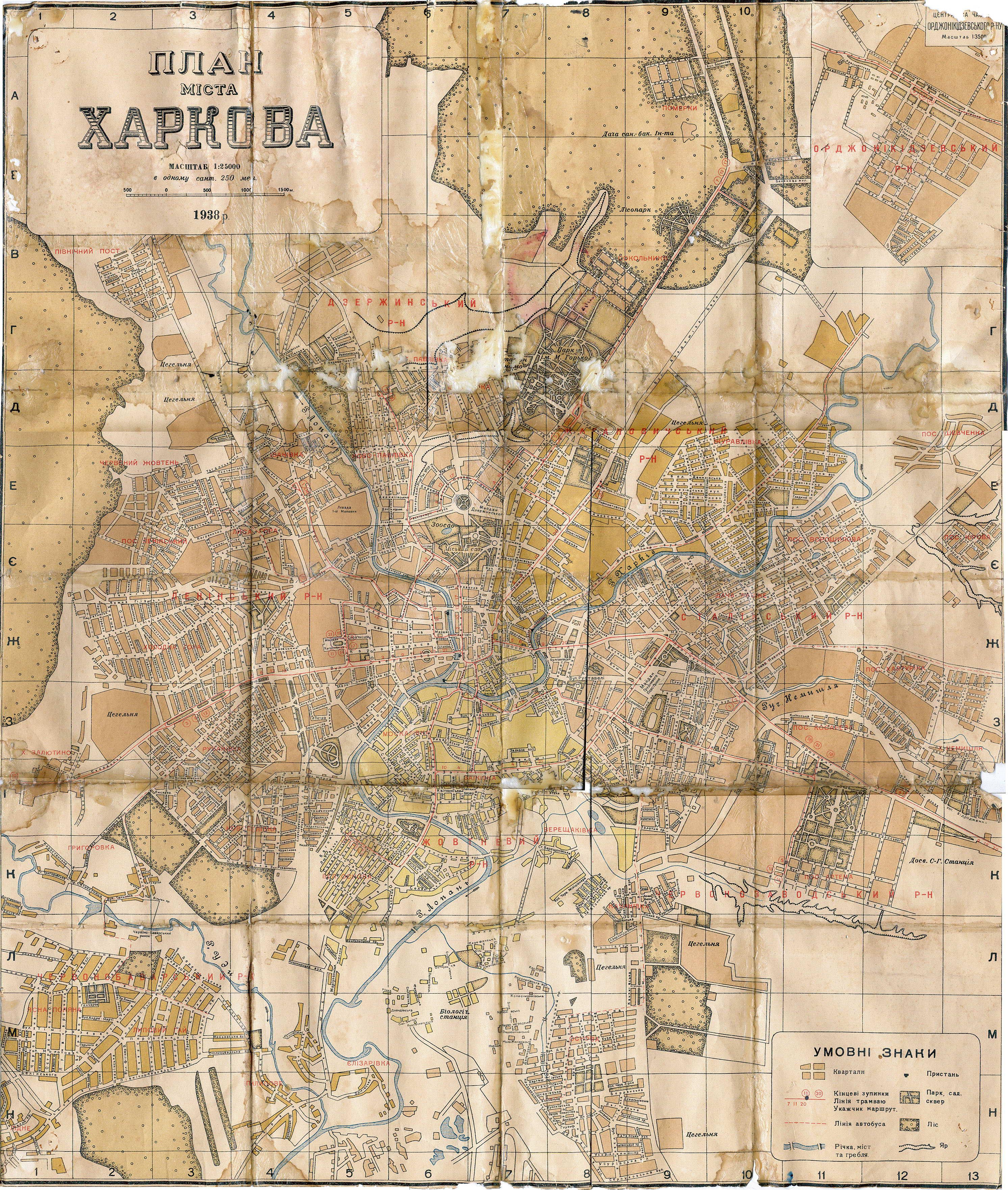
1938 map of Kharkiv

Originally named Veterinarnaya Square, its name was changed to Maidan Dzerzhynskoho (Ukrainian: майдан Дзержинського) in 1926, following the Soviet takeover of the city. This name refers to Felix Dzerzhinsky, the founder of the Bolshevik secret police (the Cheka, precursor to the KGB). It is depicted on maps of Kharkiv of 1938.

During the brief German occupation the name of the square changed twice: in 1942 the square was named German Army Square, and in 1943 Leibstandarte SS Square. After the independence of Ukraine it was renamed Freedom Square.

== Location ==
The main part of the square is bordered to the west by the site of a removed statue of Lenin, to the east by Sumska Street, to the north by the Hotel Kharkiv and to the south by Taras Shevchenko Garden. It is approximately 960 metres (3,150 feet) long and 125 metres (410 feet) wide. The area of the complete square is approximately 12 hectares (30 acres). The square is composed of two parts: a circular section 380 m (1,250 ft) in diameter, and a rectangular one 400 m (1,300 ft) by 120 m (390 ft) in size.

== Landmarks ==
A notable landmark of the square is the Derzhprom building, a prime example of constructivist architecture. The other two major buildings are the House of Projects and the House of Cooperation, which were originally constructivist but later reconstructed after World War II in the Stalinist style.

The Kharkiv Regional State Administration is situated at one end of the square.

A monumental statue of Lenin was erected in 1964 and was torn down by protesters on 28 September 2014. In August 2016, pavers were laid on the site where the statue of Lenin stood. A new fountain on the site of the former statue was opened on 23 August 2020.

In 2019, the reconstruction of the Round Square, located in the northwestern part of the square, began. It is planned to reconstruct all the paths, install benches, upgrade lighting, plant trees, and install a dry fountain. The work is expected to be completed by the city's day on 23 August 2019.

During the Russian invasion of Ukraine on 1 March 2022, the square was attacked by Russian Kalibr missiles. The explosion severely damaged the Kharkiv Regional State Administration building and nearby buildings.

== Usage ==
=== Protests and rallies ===
In 2014, the square was the site of demonstrations by pro-Russian and pro-Ukrainian activists in Kharkiv. The issue was the statue of Lenin, which was fiercely defended by pro-Russian demonstrators against pro-Ukrainian activists' attempts to dismantle it.

=== Other events and recreational activities ===
Queen + Paul Rodgers kicked off their Rock the Cosmos Tour at Freedom Square on 12 September 2008 & gathered 350,000 audience members, the show was recorded for a DVD release, entitled Live in Ukraine, which was released on 15 June 2009.

=== Victory Parades ===
From 2010 to 2013, it hosted an annual military parade in honor of Victory Day with the participation of the troops of the Kharkiv Garrison, military academies located in Kharkiv and troops from Russia.

== Gallery ==
Freedom Square, Kharkiv in 2003, showing half of the square area (only the circular neighbouring park on the north-western edge). The square proper begins at the large statue of Lenin (this statue has since been removed). This statue of Lenin is seen in the lower right corner, casting a long shadow which points into the square.

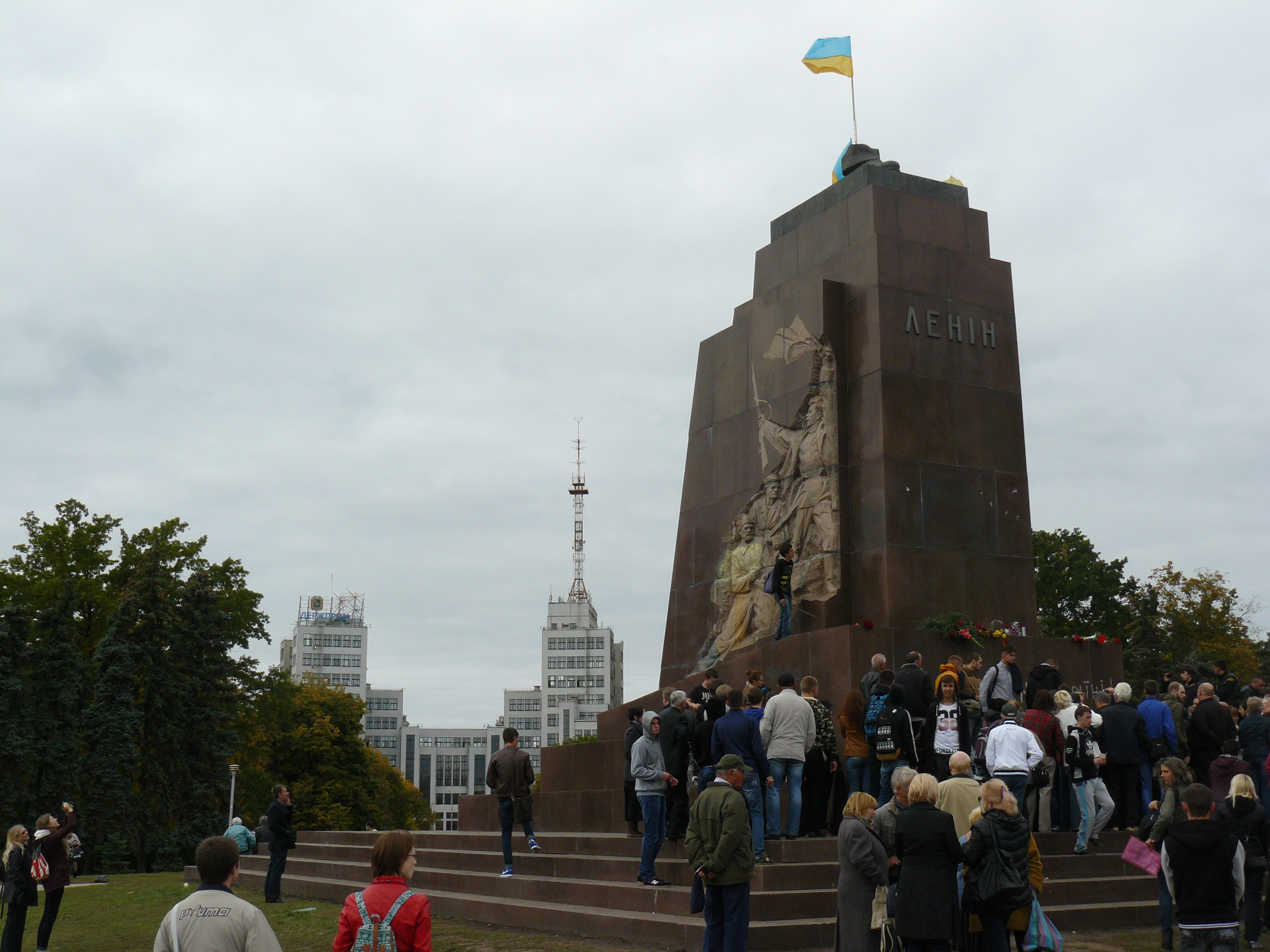
The vacant plinth where the statue of Lenin stood before it was pulled down on the night of 28 September 2014.

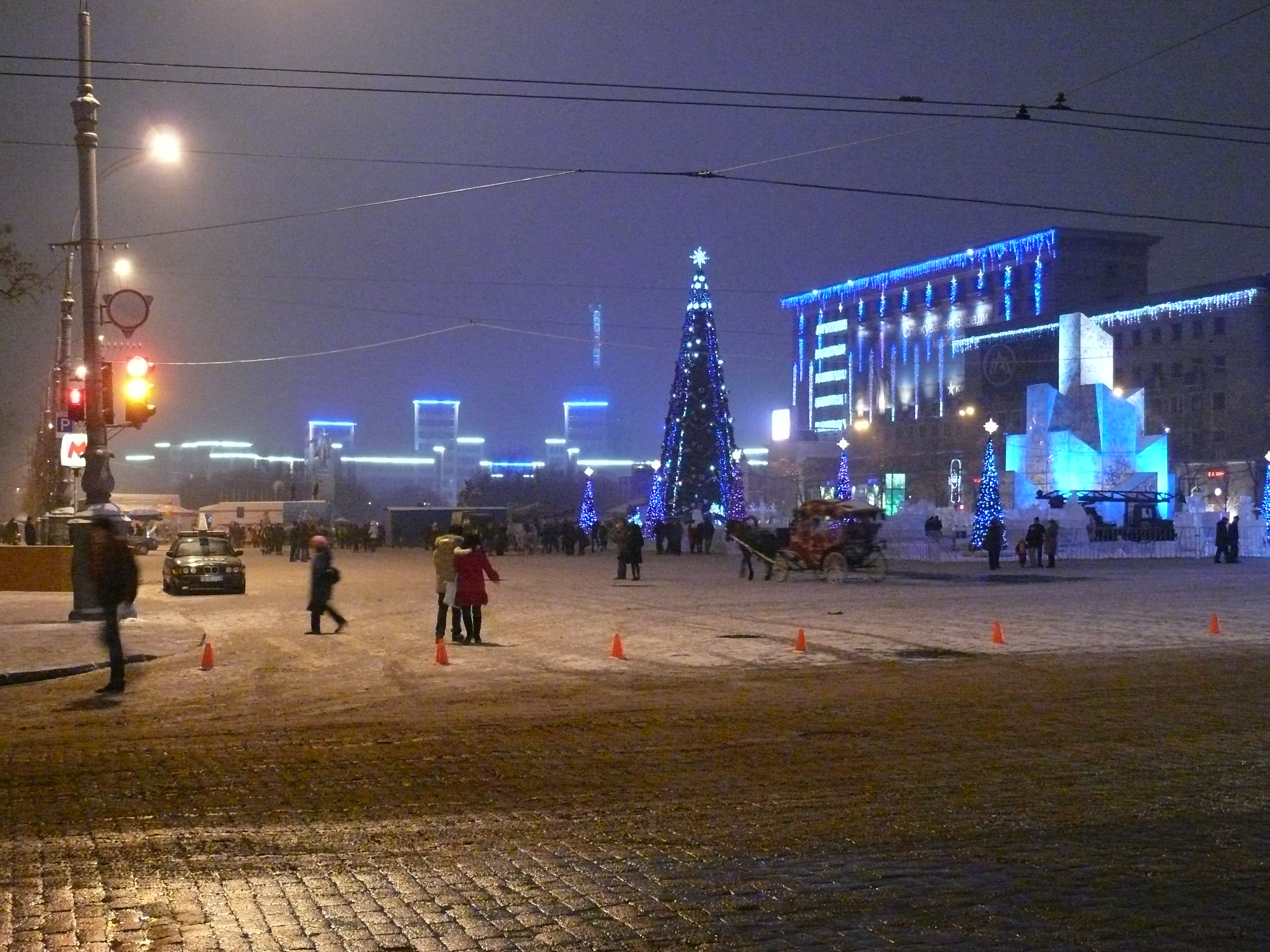
New Year, 2009

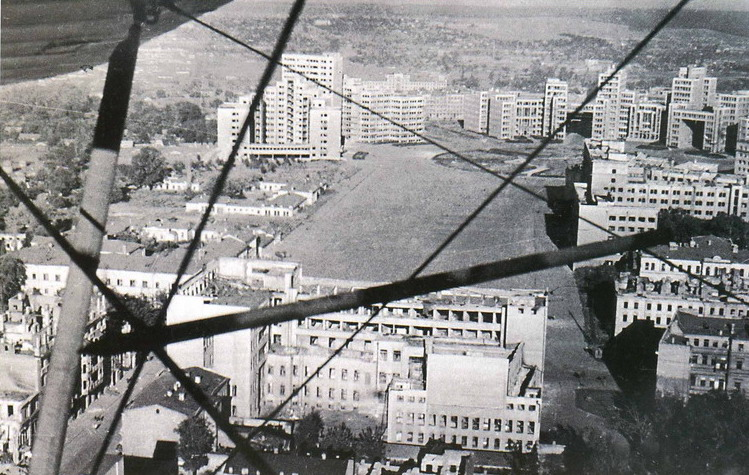
The square, then called Dzerzhinsky Square, in 1943
