= Derzhprom =

Constructivist building in Kharkiv, Ukraine

- Держпром (Ukrainian)
- Aerial view in 2020

General information
- Type: office, conference
- Architectural style: Constructivism
- Location: Maidan Svobody, 5, Kharkiv, Kharkiv Oblast, 61022, Ukraine
- Coordinates: 50°0′24″N 36°13′37.5″E
- Construction started: 1925
- Inaugurated: 7 November 1928
- Cost: 14,176,000 UAK

Height
- Antenna spire: 108 m (354 ft)
- Roof: 63 m (207 ft)

Technical details
- Floor count: 13
- Floor area: 60,000 m^{2} (650,000 sq ft)
- Lifts/elevators: 12

Design and construction
- Architects: Sergei Serafimov, Samuel Kravets and Mark Felger
- Developer: Economic Council of the USSR
- Engineer: Pavlo Rottert

Website
- https://www.derzhprom.kh.ua/

Immovable Monument of National Significance of Ukraine
- Official name: Будинок держпромисловості (ДЕРЖПРОМ) (House of State Industry (DERZHPROM))
- Type: Architecture, Urban Planning
- Reference no.: 200031

The Derzhprom (Ukrainian: Держпром) building is an office building located on Freedom Square in Kharkiv, Ukraine. Built in the Constructivist style, it was the first modern skyscraper building in the Soviet Union upon its completion in 1928. Its name is an abbreviation of two words that, taken together, mean State Industry. In English the structure is known as the State Industry Building or the Palace of Industry.

Derzhprom takes its place as a unique phenomenon of world architecture among the various structures that represent the modernist architecture of the first half of the 20th century, which are already on the UNESCO World Heritage List or the Tentative List.

On 28 October 2024, Derzhprom was bombed by Russia, sustaining significant damage.

== History ==
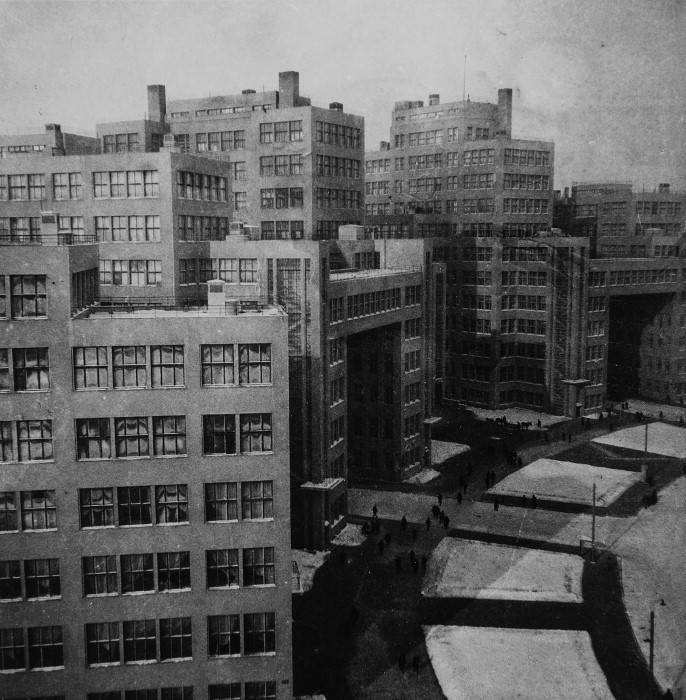
The Derzhprom building in the late 1920s.

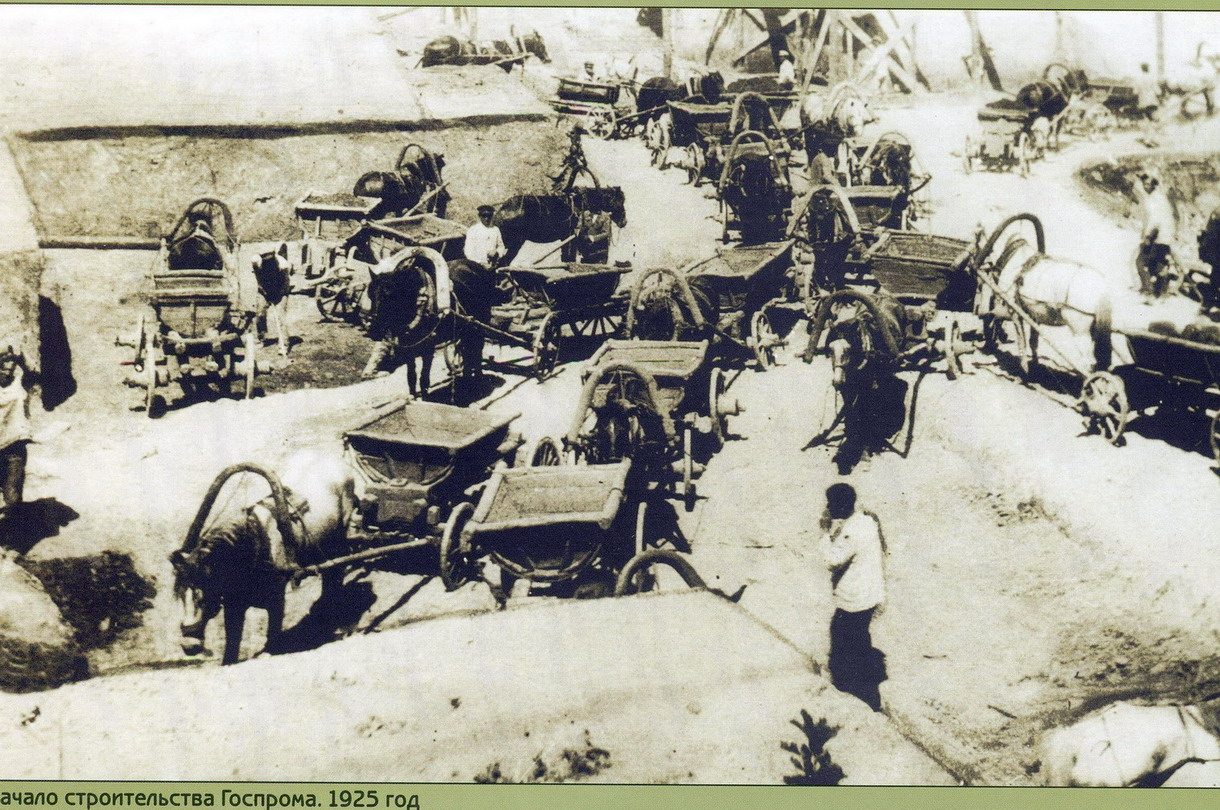
Construction of the Derzhprom building (c. 1925).

The grand opening of the "first Soviet skyscraper" took place on 7 November 1928.

The building was one of a few showcase projects designed when Kharkiv was the capital of the Ukrainian SSR. It was built by the architects Sergei Serafimov, Samuel Kravets and Mark Felger in only three years. Upon completion in 1928 it was the most spacious single structure in the world, and was not surpassed until the 1930s. Its unique feature lies in the symmetry which can only be sensed at one point, in the centre of the square.

The use of concrete in its construction and the system of overhead walkways and individual interlinked towers made the building extremely innovative. Derzhprom's offices and other rooms featured advanced technology such as air conditioning, electrical lighting, and radio points, and the building housed Ukraine's first garbage chute system. The critic Reyner Banham in his Theory and Design in the First Machine Age regarded the building as one of the major architectural achievements of the 1920s, comparable in scale only to the Dessau Bauhaus and the Van Nelle Factory in Rotterdam. This allowed the structure to survive any destruction attempts during the Second World War, although it was damaged on the inside from explosions.

In the spring of 1926, it was decided to close the construction due to financial difficulties. Then the head of construction of the State Industry, Pavlo Rottert, left for Moscow, where he managed to find support for the construction from Felix Dzerzhinsky. In March 1926, he returned to build a skyscraper, and in August 1926 it was decided to finance the construction on an extraordinary basis.

The Derzhprom complex was used as a symbol of modernity in films such as Dziga Vertov's Three Songs about Lenin and Sergei Eisenstein's The General Line. The building's notability was overshadowed following the moving of the Ukrainian capital to Kyiv in 1934, the later denunciation of Constructivism in favour of Stalinist architecture, and the Second World War. Derzhprom housed the Council of People's Commissars as well as numerous government departments when Kharkiv was the capital. Since the 1950s, one of its towers was used as a television centre and a TV relay tower was built on its roof.

The building was placed under in the tentative UNESCO World Heritage list in 2017 and was placed under provisional enhanced protection by UNESCO in 2022.

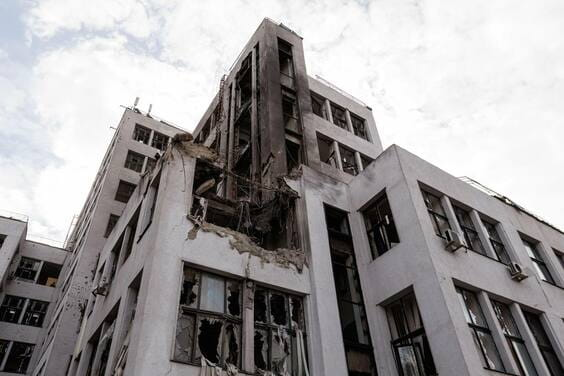
After the strike in 2024

During the Russo-Ukrainian war, Derzhprom was hit by a Russian guided bomb on 28 October 2024, believed to be of the FAB-500 model, causing significant damage and nine injuries. As the result, the mayor of Kharkiv Ihor Terekhov and the Bureau of UNESCO in Ukraine have initiated an accelerated procedure of nominating the Freedom Square ensemble (including Derzhprom) to the World Heritage list.

== Architecture ==
Panorama of the Derzhprom building in 2018.

Façade of the Derzhprom building in 2018.

Derzhprom is a symbol of Kharkiv as an industrial, modern and big city.

The architecture of Derzhprom relates to international Constructivism, its forms are industrial. The house has a high aesthetic potential and functionality; its construction is compared to a "communication leap". In the 1920s, such architecture was a novelty not only in Europe but also around the world.

Architectural functionalism includes the following functions:

- Utilitarian – a place for industrial management activities in Ukraine.
- Ideological – the disclosure of the idea of industrialization as a progressive phenomenon.
- Social – a spacious center of the new Kharkiv, a socially significant object of government, a place of mass events such as holidays and demonstrations.
- Symbolic – "organized world", a symbol of a new era and of industrialization.
- Compositional – dominance in the spatial structure of the city; connecting the spaces of the square and the city; demarcation of the square and the city (at the level of the square).
- Symatic – laconic forms that lead to archetypal schemes; inclusion in the symbolism of the landscape.

== See also ==
- Freedom Square (Kharkiv)
