= Battle of Kharkiv (2022) =

2022 battle of the Russo-Ukrainian War

- Part of the eastern front of the Russian invasion of Ukraine
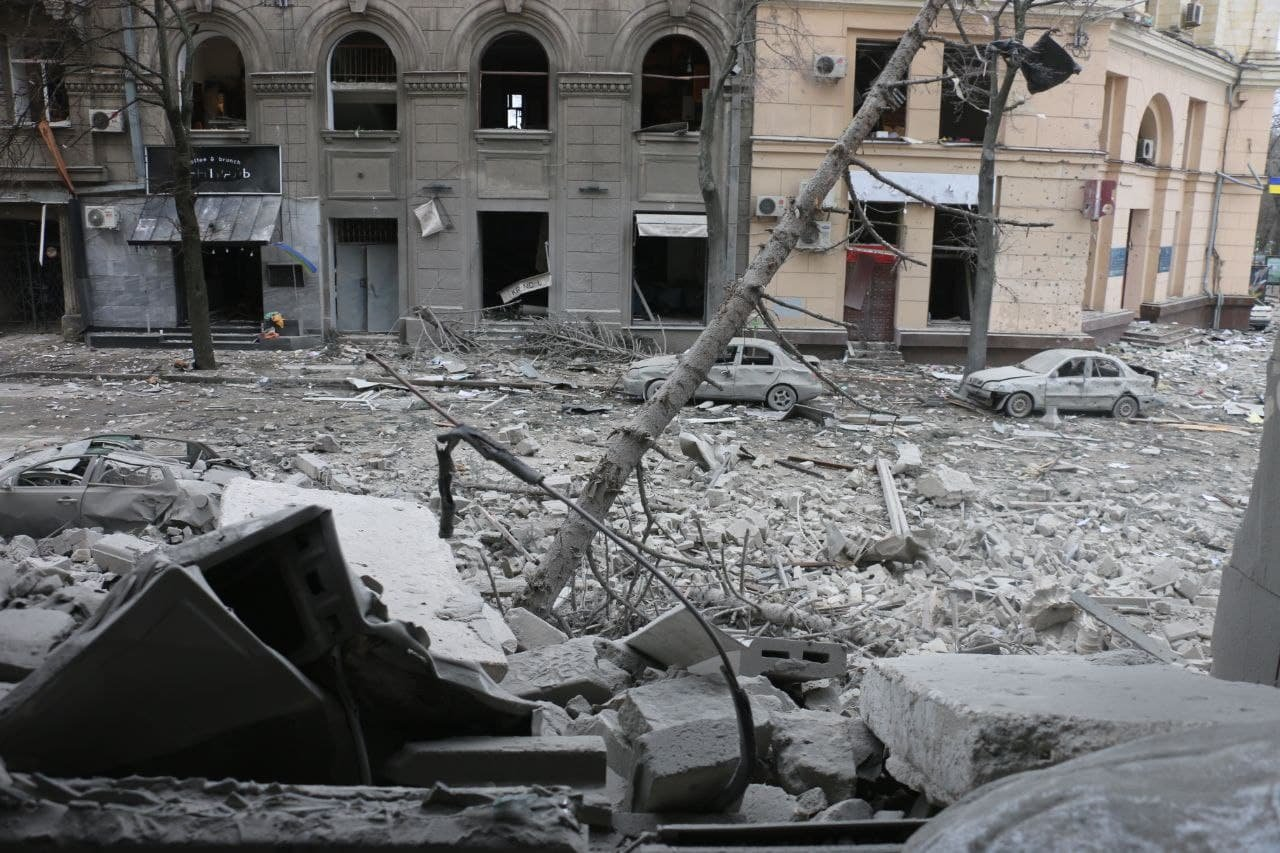
- A street in downtown Kharkiv after being shelled
Date	24 February – 13 May 2022 (2 months, 2 weeks and 5 days)
Location	Kharkiv, Ukraine
Result	Ukrainian victory

Belligerents
Russia	Ukraine

Units involved
Russian Ground Forces: 1st Guards Tank Army; 2nd 'Tamanskaya' Guards Motor Rifle Division; 4th Guards Tank Division; 27th Guards Motor Rifle Brigade; 20th Guards Combined Arms Army; 3rd Motor Rifle Division; 144th Guards Motor Rifle Division; 488th Motor Rifle Regiment; 6th Combined Arms Army; 41st Combined Arms Army; 14th Army Corps; 200th Separate Motor Rifle Brigade; PMC Redut	Armed Forces of Ukraine: Ukrainian Ground Forces; 92nd Mechanized Brigade; 22nd Motorized Infantry Battalion; 93rd Mechanized Brigade; Territorial Defense Forces; 113th Territorial Defense Brigade; Ukrainian Air Force; National Guard of Ukraine; 3rd Spartan Brigade; 5th Slobozhanshchyna Brigade; Security Service of Ukraine; National Police of Ukraine; Dzhokhar Dudayev Battalion; Carpathian Sich Battalion; Ukrainian irregulars

Strength
1st GTA: 35,000–50,000 troops, 500–600 tanks, 600–800 IFVs; 300–400 artillery pieces 20th CAA: 20,000 troops, 560 BMP fighting vehicles, 300 T-72 tanks 200th Brigade: 1,400–1,600 troops	Unknown

Casualties and losses
Ukrainian claim: 4,370–4,700+ killed Equipment losses: 308+ vehicles destroyed, including 131+ tanks (1st GTA)	Russian claim: 276+ killed, 471 captured
- Per Ukraine: 606 civilians killed; 600,000+ evacuated

The Battle of Kharkiv was a military engagement that took place from February to May 2022 in and around the city of Kharkiv in Ukraine, as part of the eastern Ukraine offensive during the Russian invasion of Ukraine. Kharkiv, located just 30 kilometres (19 mi) south of the Russia–Ukraine border and a predominately Russian-speaking city, is the second-largest city in Ukraine and was considered a major target for the Russian military early in the invasion.

By 13 May, Ukrainian forces pushed Russian units attempting to encircle the city back towards the Russian border. Additionally, it was reported that Russia had withdrawn units from the area. The Institute for the Study of War opined that Ukraine had "likely won the battle of Kharkiv". However, bombardment continued, and by 20 May, Russian forces were again shelling the city.

On 12 June, Amnesty International claimed it found the evidence of widespread use of widely-banned cluster munitions by Russia, such as 9N210/9N235 cluster bombs, and "scatterable" munitions that eject small mines that explode later in timed intervals. In September, the Ukrainian military launched a major counteroffensive into territories that were still under Russian control in Kharkiv Oblast. As a result, Russian forces located close to the city were pushed back, resulting in significantly reduced pressure on Kharkiv.

== Background ==
The Ukrainian military first started preparing the defence of Kharkiv Oblast in case of a Russian invasion after the appointment of Valerii Zaluzhnyi as commander-in-chief in July 2021. Russian forces frequently carried out "false-flag" operations near the border of Kharkiv Oblast before the 2022 invasion. However, the Ukrainians did not expect a full-scale invasion, and were ill-prepared for a Russian advance on Kharkiv from the directions of Lyptsi, Zolochiv, and Bohodukhiv, having anticipated combat only from the direction of Kupiansk.

== Battle ==
=== Commencement of operations (24–26 February) ===
Ukrainian military bases near Kharkiv were among the military targets bombarded by Russian forces in the early hours of 24 February. The 92nd Mechanized Brigade's base at Chuhuiv was hit at 04:00, according to its commander, Pavlo Fedosenko. According to Lt. Col. Petro Vitushko of the 92nd Brigade, most of the vehicles and equipment had been moved off the grounds of the base by the time of the strikes.

An estimated 20,000 Russian forces amassed in Belgorod crossed the border on 24 February and began advancing towards Kharkiv. Ukraine's 92nd Brigade clashed with them across a 100-kilometer front. Part of the body of forces broke off towards Vovchansk, capturing the city after a short battle and heading south towards Izium. Russian forces began encircling Kharkiv from the north and eastern directions.

Russian troops failed to enter Kharkiv on 24 February. According to Ukrainska Pravda, the Russians had planned to occupy the city within two days. A captured Russian officer later testified that the city was expected to fall within three days.

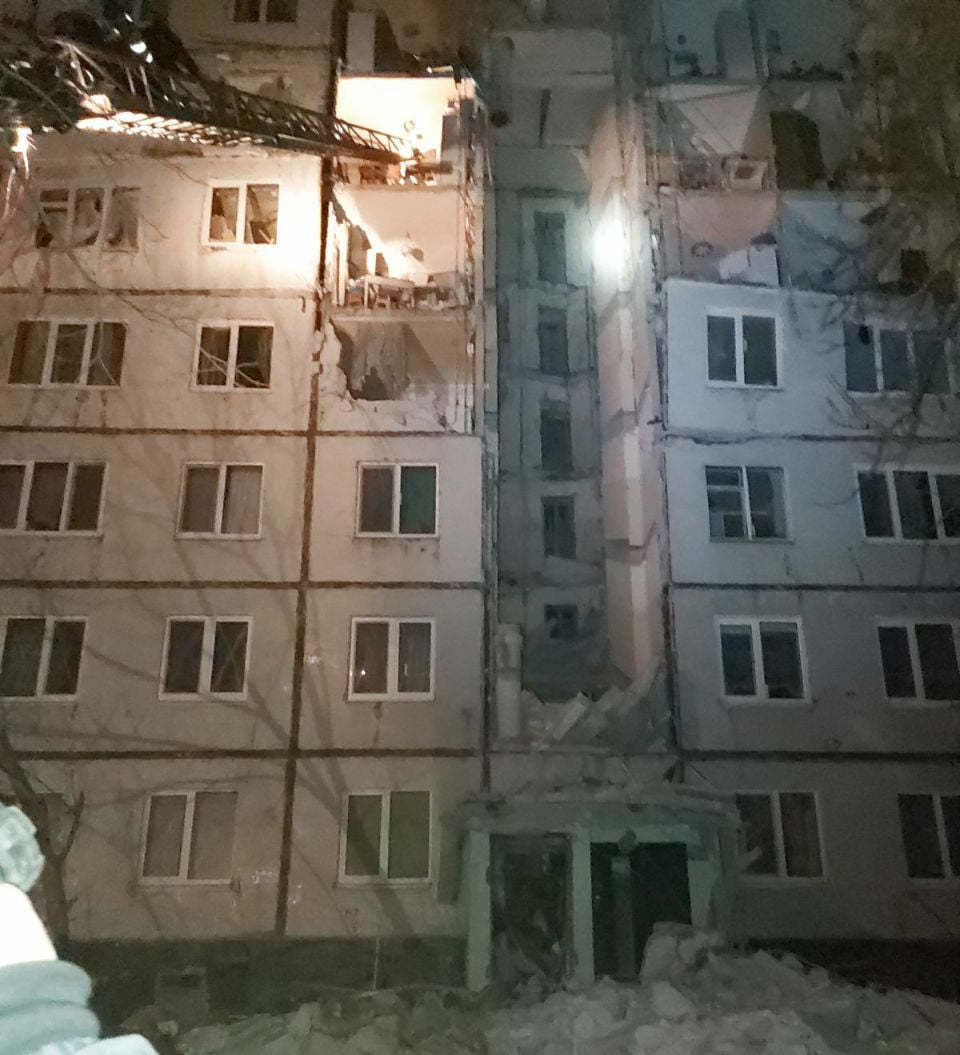
An apartment block in Kharkiv partially destroyed by a missile, 26 February

By 25 February, fierce fighting had broken out in the northern suburbs of the city, near the village of Tsyrkuny, where Ukrainian forces were able to hold against Russian forces. Russian artillery barrages hit an apartment block in the city, killing a young boy. On 26 February, Oleh Synyehubov, the Ukrainian Governor of Kharkiv Oblast announced a curfew and that non-military vehicles on the street would be "liquidated."

American officials reported that the heaviest fighting of the entire conflict was occurring at Kharkiv.

In the early morning of 27 February, Russian forces destroyed a gas pipeline in Kharkiv.

=== Fighting in the city (27–28 February) ===
On 27 February, two companies of the Russian 2nd Guards Spetsnaz Brigade entered Kharkiv proper. According to Ukrainian officials, some Russian soldiers attempting to enter the city from the west were stopped at Pisochyn.

The Russian companies were cut off as soon as they had advanced into the city. Ukrainian officials claimed that their forces had destroyed at least 6 GAZ Tigr-Ms, half of Russian military vehicles that had advanced into Kharkiv. Russian Ministry of Defence spokesman Igor Konashenkov claimed that Russian forces had secured the surrender of the Ukrainian 302nd Anti-Aircraft Missile Regiment and captured 471 Ukrainian soldiers, a claim that Ukrainian officials denied.

A fierce firefight broke out at the School No. 134, where one Russian company was pinned down. Synyehubov reporting that heavy fighting was occurring, and Ministry of Internal Affairs advisor Anton Herashchenko claiming street fighting was underway in the city centre.

On the morning of 28 February, the Russian company broke out and rejoined the main body of Russian forces outside the city. Synyehubov reported that Ukrainian forces had regained full control of the city. He added that dozens of Russian soldiers had surrendered. Fedosenko stated that the Ukrainian forces "drove the Russians out of the city, dug in and that's it."

=== Intensified strikes (28 February – 2 April) ===
On 28 February, Herashchenko claimed that Russian rocket strikes on the city had killed dozens of civilians, while Synyehubov reported that eleven civilians were killed and dozens wounded, and Ihor Terekhov, the mayor of Kharkiv, reporting that nine civilians were killed and 37 were wounded. One of those killed was a 25-year-old student from Algeria, who was killed by a Russian sniper.

Later on 28 February, Terekhov reported that Russian forces were beginning to destroy electrical substations in Kharkiv, resulting in some areas of the city being disconnected from power, heating and water. He also added that 87 homes had been damaged in Russian shelling. It was also reported that the Malyshev Factory had been destroyed by Russian shelling.

Later on 28 February, Human Rights Watch stated that Russian forces used cluster bombs in the Industrialnyi, Saltivskyi and Shevchenkivskyi districts of the city. Human Rights Watch noted that this use of inherently-indiscriminate cluster bombs against a civilian area "might constitute a war crime".

The shelling of Kharkiv regional state administration on 1 March

On the morning of 1 March, a Russian 3M54-1 Kalibr missile struck Freedom Square in central Kharkiv, detonating in front of the Kharkiv Oblast administrative building. The Slovene consulate was destroyed in the blast. An opera house and a concert hall were also damaged. At least 24 people were wounded and 29 were killed, according to the regional administration.

The Biathlon Federation of Ukraine later reported that one of the Ukrainian soldiers killed in Kharkiv on 1 March was Yevgeny Malyshev, a biathlete and former member of the Ukrainian national team. Later on 1 March, it was reported that an 21-year-old Indian student studying at Kharkiv National Medical University had been killed during Russian shelling. The student was from the village of Chalageri in Karnataka. According to the local Indian student coordinator, he was killed by an airstrike in the morning while he stood in a line-up to buy groceries. Indian authorities later announced they had evacuated all Indian nationals from Kyiv as part of a wider operation. Of the 8,000 Indian students that were still in Ukraine on 1 March, around half were located in Kharkiv and Sumy. A member of the OSCE Special Monitoring Mission to Ukraine, Mayna Fenina, was also killed during shelling on 1 March.

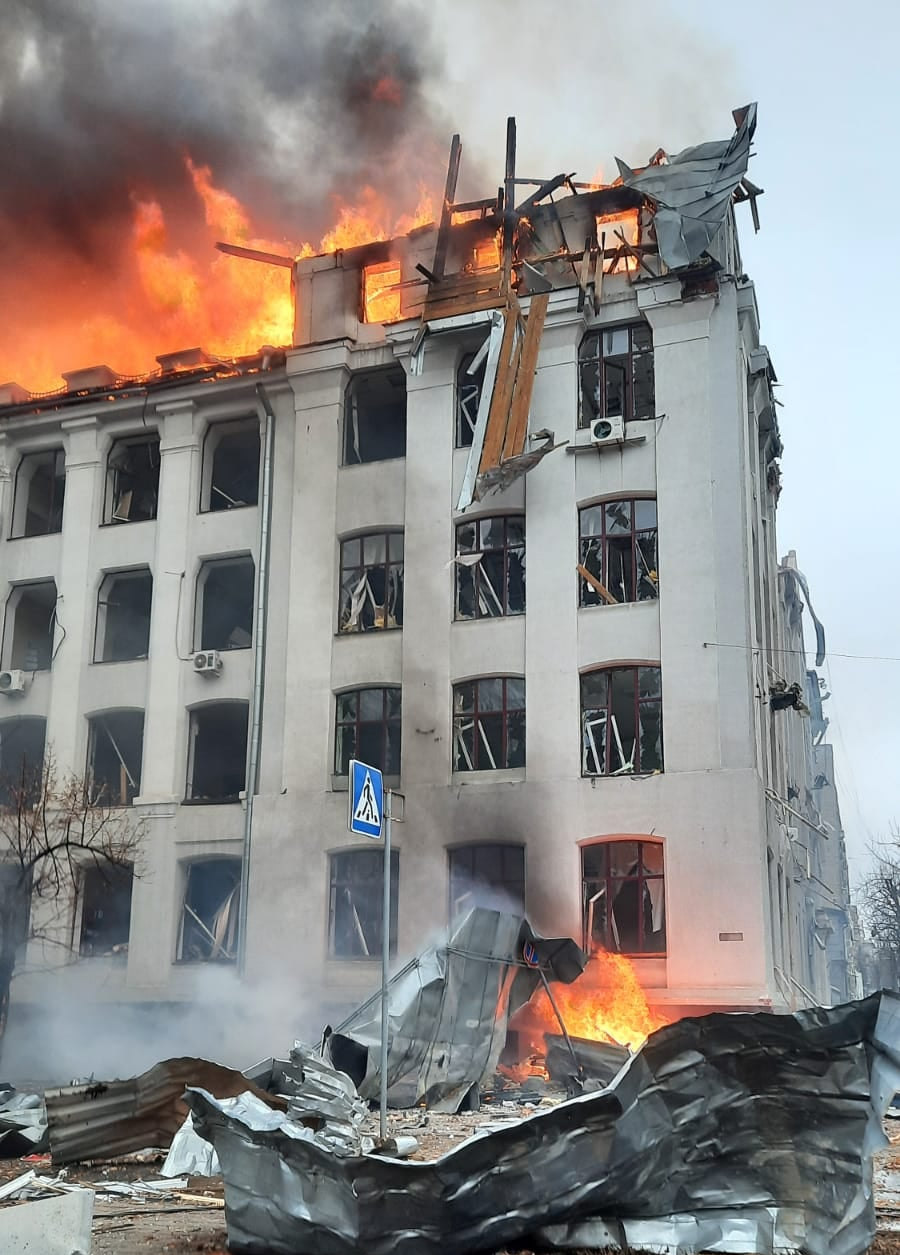
School of Economics of the National University of Kharkiv, 2 March

On 2 March, Synyehubov stated that at least 21 people had been killed and 112 wounded in the previous 24 hours. Russian paratroopers landed in Kharkiv and conducted a raid on a Ukrainian military hospital after an aerial assault on the city, leading to heavy clashes between Russian and Ukrainian forces. A local official later claimed that Ukrainian forces still controlled the hospital.

The Kharkiv Police headquarters, a military academy and the National University of Kharkiv were damaged by Russian shelling during the morning. Several residential areas were also struck by Russian missiles. Russian missiles later struck Freedom Square again, damaging the Kharkiv City Council building and the Derzhprom, in addition to some high-rise buildings.

On the night of 2 March, two missiles struck the headquarters of the Kharkiv Territorial Defence Forces. The Assumption Cathedral, which was being used as a shelter by civilians, was also damaged, along with the Catholic Church of St. Anthony. CNN released a report claiming that of all the 16 locations in Kharkiv targeted by Russian shelling that week; only three were non-civilian areas.

The Security Service of Ukraine stated on 6 March that Russian BM-21 Grads were shelling the Kharkiv Institute of Physics and Technology, which houses a nuclear research facility, and warned it could lead to a large-scale ecological disaster. The International Atomic Energy Agency stated the next day that the nuclear research facility had reportedly been damaged but there was no radiation leak. Local emergency officials stated that at least eight civilians had been killed in the shelling on the city overnight. The Azerbaijani consulate in the city was meanwhile severely damaged and the Albanian consulate was demolished.

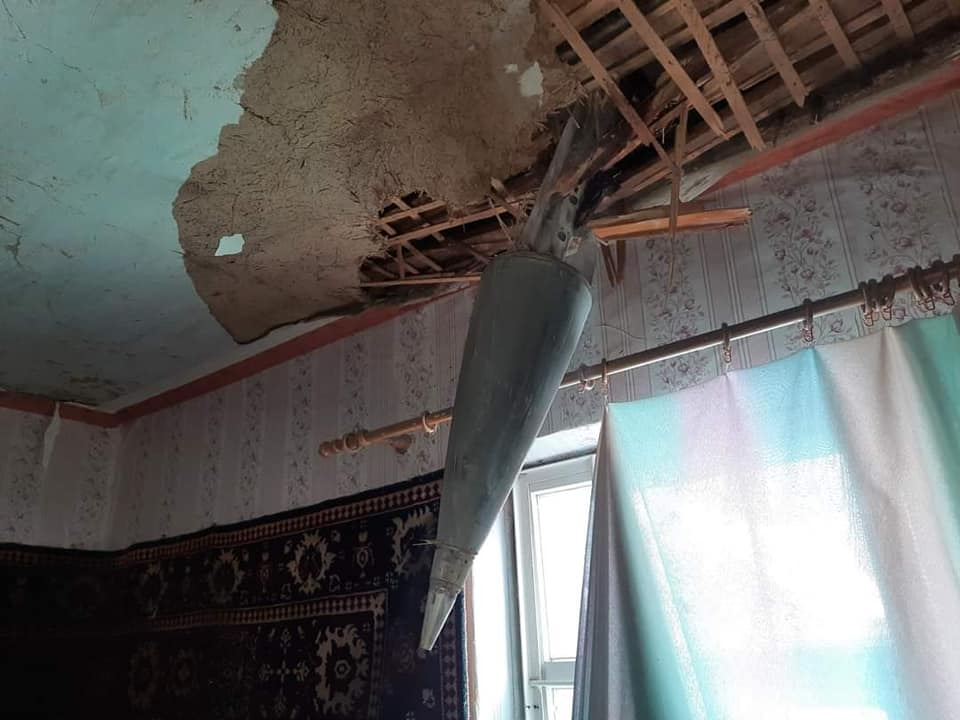
A rocket stuck in an apartment ceiling

On 7 March, the Ukrainian Ministry of Defence announced that Ukrainian forces had killed Russian Major General Vitaly Gerasimov, a deputy commander of the 41st Combined Arms Army. This claim later turned out to be untrue, as Gerasimov received the Order of Alexander Nevsky on 23 May. Two other Russian officers were also killed in the attack. Russian soldiers also killed two civilian volunteers at the Feldman Ecopark as they entered the animals' enclosure to feed them.

On 8 March, Synyehubov stated that more than 600,000 civilians had been evacuated from the city via railways. Ukrainian officials stated that all of Kharkiv was under their control, and that aside from some shelling on the outskirts of the city, no Russian offensive action was being taken.

On 10 March, the State Emergency Service of Ukraine stated that four people, including two children, were killed by Russian shelling in Kharkiv. Russian shelling also destroyed a shopping mall in the centre of the city. Later, Herashchenko claimed that a Russian airstrike had struck the Kharkiv Institute of Physics and Technology.

On 14 March, Russian shelling hit a residential area, killing two civilians and wounding one. The following day, Synyehubov claimed that the city had been shelled 65 times on 14 March, killing a civilian, and that 600 residential buildings had been destroyed in Kharkiv. The following day, Ukraine reported that they had killed Igor Nikolaev, commander of the 252nd Motorized Rifle Regiment, along with around 30% of the regiment's personnel and equipment.

On 16 March, Ukrainian officials claimed that three civilians were killed and five were wounded when Russian forces shelled a market.

On 18 March, Kharkiv Regional Prosecutor's Office reported shelling of residential buildings in Slobidskyi and Moskovskyi districts of the city. In addition, the building of the Institute of State Administration of the National Academy for Public Administration was partially ruined. Russian shelling of Saltivka killed 96-year-old Boris Romanchenko, who survived four Nazi concentration camps and was engaged in preserving the memory of the crimes of Nazism.

On 19 March, Oleh Synyehubov, the appointed head of the Kharkiv Regional Civil-Military Administration (HOVA), stated that the northern suburbs of Kharkiv had been under constant bombardment and that the city centre was being struck by shells and rockets. He claimed that numerous administrative and cultural buildings had been damaged and destroyed. He also stated that Ukrainian forces had counter-attacked, pushing Russian forces away from the outskirts of the city.

On 24 March, a Russian airstrike hit a Nova Poshta office, killing six civilians and injuring at least 15. Ukrainian forces retook the villages of Mala Rohan and Vilkhivka, approximately 20 kilometres east of Kharkiv, on 25 March. On 26 March, Russian shells damaged a monument at the Drobytsky Yar Holocaust memorial.

On 28 March, Kharkiv Mayor Ihor Terekhov said that about 30% of city's residents had left Kharkiv since the onset of the war. Head of HOVA, military governor Oleh Synyehubov, reported that Russians had again hit city neighbourhoods with cluster munitions.

After retaking the village of Mala Rohan, Ukrainian forces managed to reopen the highway between Kharkiv and Chuhuiv by 30 March. A commander in the 92nd Brigade told AFP journalists that Russian forces had been pushed back by about 10 kilometres to the north.

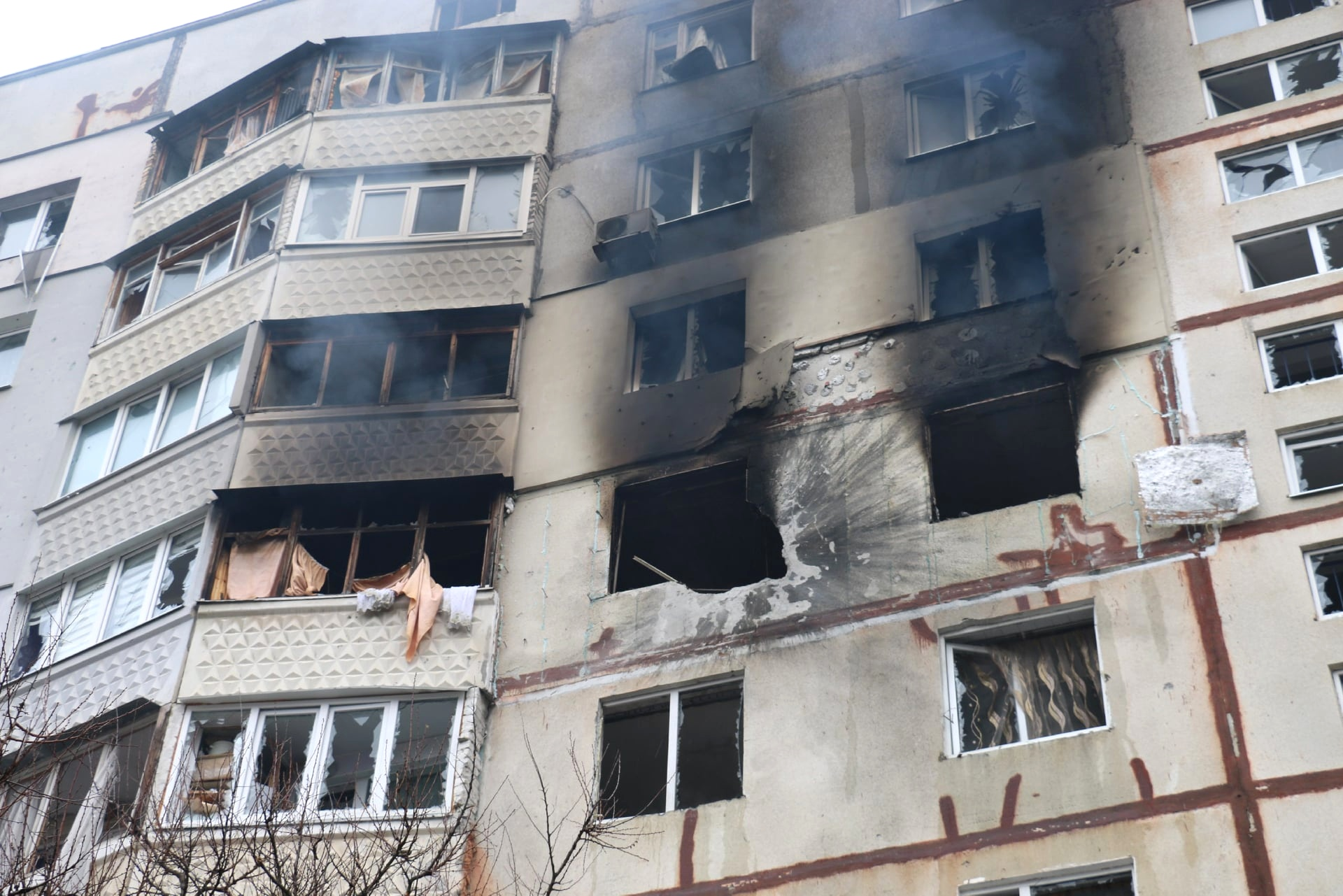
Saltivka neighbourhood after shelling on 31 March

Amid the heightened Russian shelling of Kharkiv on 31 March, Russian authorities attributed an explosion at an oil supply depot approximately 25 miles (40 km) north of the border in Belgorod within Russia to an attack by two Ukrainian Mi-24 military helicopters. Meanwhile, the Russians claimed to have killed, on the same day, more than 100 "extremists and mercenaries" from Western countries in Kharkiv with a high-precision Iskander missile strike on a defence base.

=== Russian bypass (April) ===
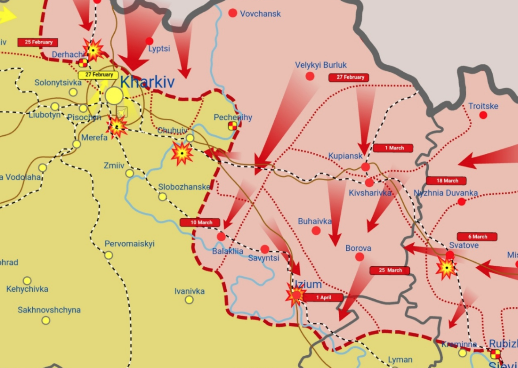
Frontline situation around Kharkiv in April 2022

By 1 April, the Institute for the Study of War assessed that Russian command had abandoned its operations to encircle and capture Kharkiv, now seeking to fix in place Ukrainian mechanised units to prevent them from reinforcing the Donbas or launching counterattacks elsewhere.

On 2 April, according to Synyehubov, the Russians were bypassing Izyum to continue to the Luhansk and Donetsk regions. On 3 April 2022, the Ukrainian government stated that two Russian soldiers had been killed and 28 others hospitalised after Ukrainian civilians handed out poisoned cakes to Russian soldiers of the Russian 3rd Motor Rifle Division in Izium. They also claimed that 500 more soldiers, also from the same division, were in hospital suffering from heavy alcohol poisoning "of unknown origin," and that the Russian command is writing off these cases as "not combat losses."

On 4 April, Ukraine's defence ministry warned that the invaders were preparing to launch a new assault to take the city from the east.

Russian shelling of Kharkiv between 14 and 17 April left 18 civilians dead and 106 wounded.

On 17 April, Synyehubov claimed on Telegram that the villages of Bazaliyivka, Lebyazhe and part of Kutuzivka were retaken in a Ukrainian counteroffensive, and that forces had advanced to near the village of Mala Rohan. In addition, he stated that Ukrainian forces had destroyed five tanks and ten armoured vehicles "by jet fire" and had killed or captured 100 Russian soldiers. The villages of Bairak and Bobrivka northeast of Kharkiv were recaptured by 19 April.

On 27 April, Kharkiv remained partially encircled. On 29 April, Synyehubov said that since the war started, more than 2,000 buildings in the city were either damaged or destroyed. He also said that on 28 April, due to almost non-stop shelling, five civilians were killed. Also on 29 April it was reported that the village Ruska Lozova, near Kharkiv, was retaken by Ukraine.

=== Ukrainian counteroffensive (1–13 May) ===
In May 2022, Ukrainian forces began a counter-offensive to drive Russian forces out of the city and towards the international border. By 12 May, the United Kingdom Ministry of Defense reported that Russia had withdrawn units from the Kharkiv area. On 2 May, the Institute for the Study of War (ISW) reported that Ukraine retook the village of Staryi Saltiv, 40 km east of the city. Shestakove was recaptured by the Ukrainian military on 5 May.

On 4 May 2022 in Kharkiv Oblast, Ukraine, a T-90M Proryv-3 was destroyed in action, the first confirmed destroyed in the war. The tank, which appeared near Kharkiv on 25 April, was destroyed by soldiers of the 127th Territorial Defence Brigade. On 6 May, the ISW described a Ukrainian counteroffensive "along a broad arc" north and east of Kharkiv, reporting that Ukraine had recaptured "several villages," including Tsyrkuny, Peremoha and part of Cherkaski Tyshky. The ISW speculated that Ukraine "may successfully push Russian forces out of artillery range of Kharkiv in the coming days." On 7 May, Ukrainian forces reported that five villages northeast of Kharkiv had been retaken. Quoting a Ukrainian official, The New York Times said that the battle for Kharkiv was not over, but that at the moment, Ukraine was dominating. The advance north and east, made mainly by the 92nd Mechanized Brigade and the 93rd Mechanized Brigade, forced the Russian forces to retreat across the Donets river while blowing the bridges behind them.

On 10 May, Ukrainian forces claimed to have recaptured four settlements. This counteroffensive, if successful, could bring Ukrainian forces within several kilometres of the Russian border.

By 13 May, the ISW opined that Ukraine had "likely won the battle of Kharkiv". The Mayor of Kharkiv said to the BBC: "There was no shelling in the city for the last five days. There was only one attempt from Russians to hit the city with a missile rocket near Kharkiv airport, but the missile was eliminated by Ukrainian Air Defence."

== Continued fighting, September counteroffensive and Russian retreat ==
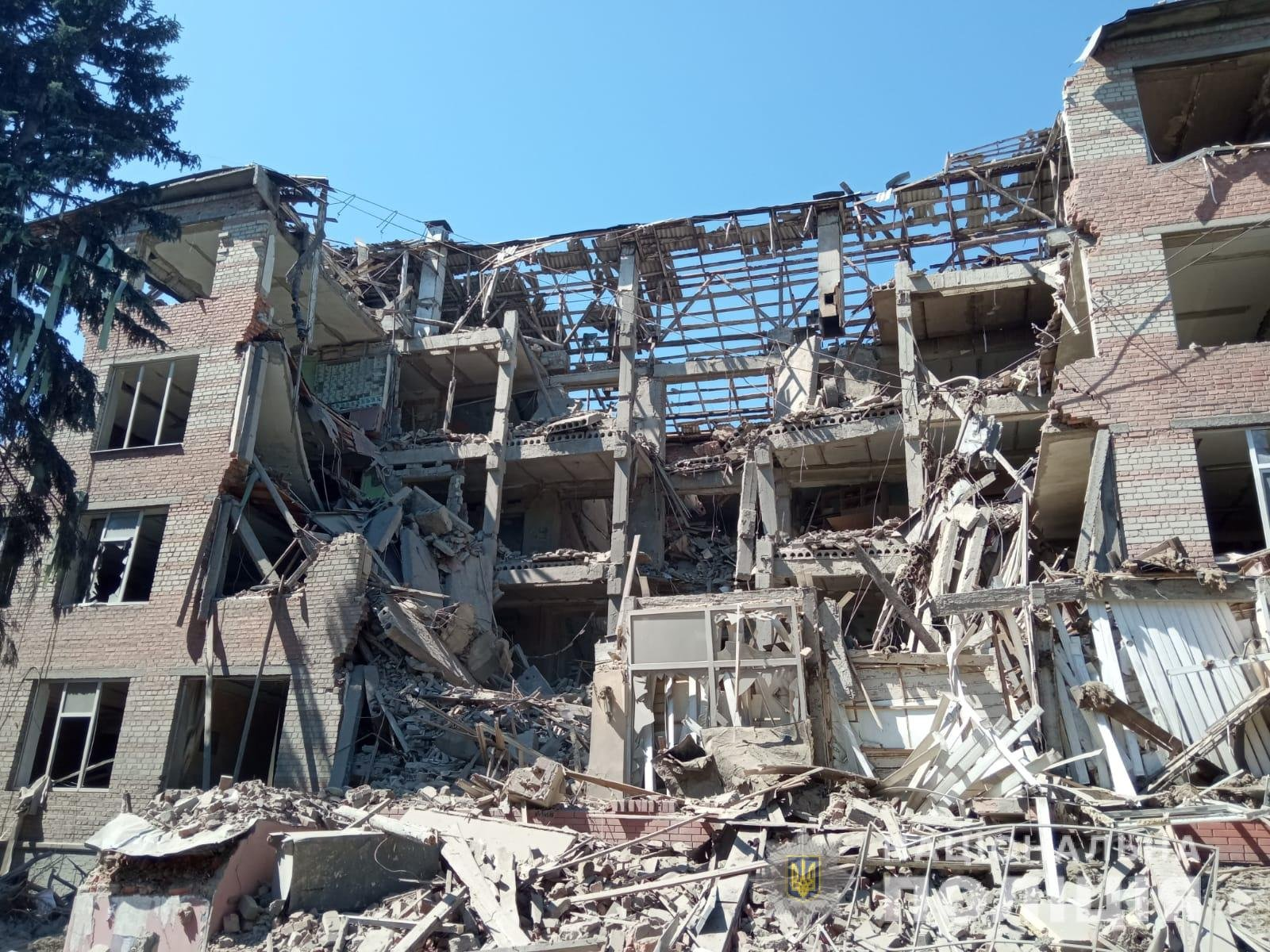
Housing and Communal College destroyed by rocket strike on 20 June

After the Ukrainian counteroffensive, Russian forces were driven back to defensive positions, some of which were within miles of the Russia-Ukraine international border. Despite this, they continued to shell various Kharkiv suburbs, as well as the city proper, killing numerous civilians and wounding dozens more.

On 20 May, Russian forces again shelled several villages in the Kharkiv district, including the city of Kharkiv itself, using BM-21 Grad, BM-27 Uragan and BM-30 Smerch multiple rocket launchers.

On 20 June, new rocket strikes destroyed Housing and Communal College of Kharkiv National University of Urban Economy and a depot of Kharkiv Metro. On 24 June, sports complex of Kharkiv Polytechnic Institute was destroyed.

On 3 July, the Russian defence ministry claimed an airstrike struck a forward position of the Territorial Defence Forces' 127th Separate Brigade, neutralising 100 Ukrainian troops and destroying "15 units of military equipment." This claim was not independently verified at the time.

On 4 July, new missile strike ruined a gymnasium. On 6 July, Russian shelling destroyed one of the buildings at Kharkiv National Pedagogical University and a former manor house and architectural monument built in 1832.

On 20 July, at least three people were killed in the morning as a result of a Russian missile attack on Kharkiv, including a 13-year-old boy.

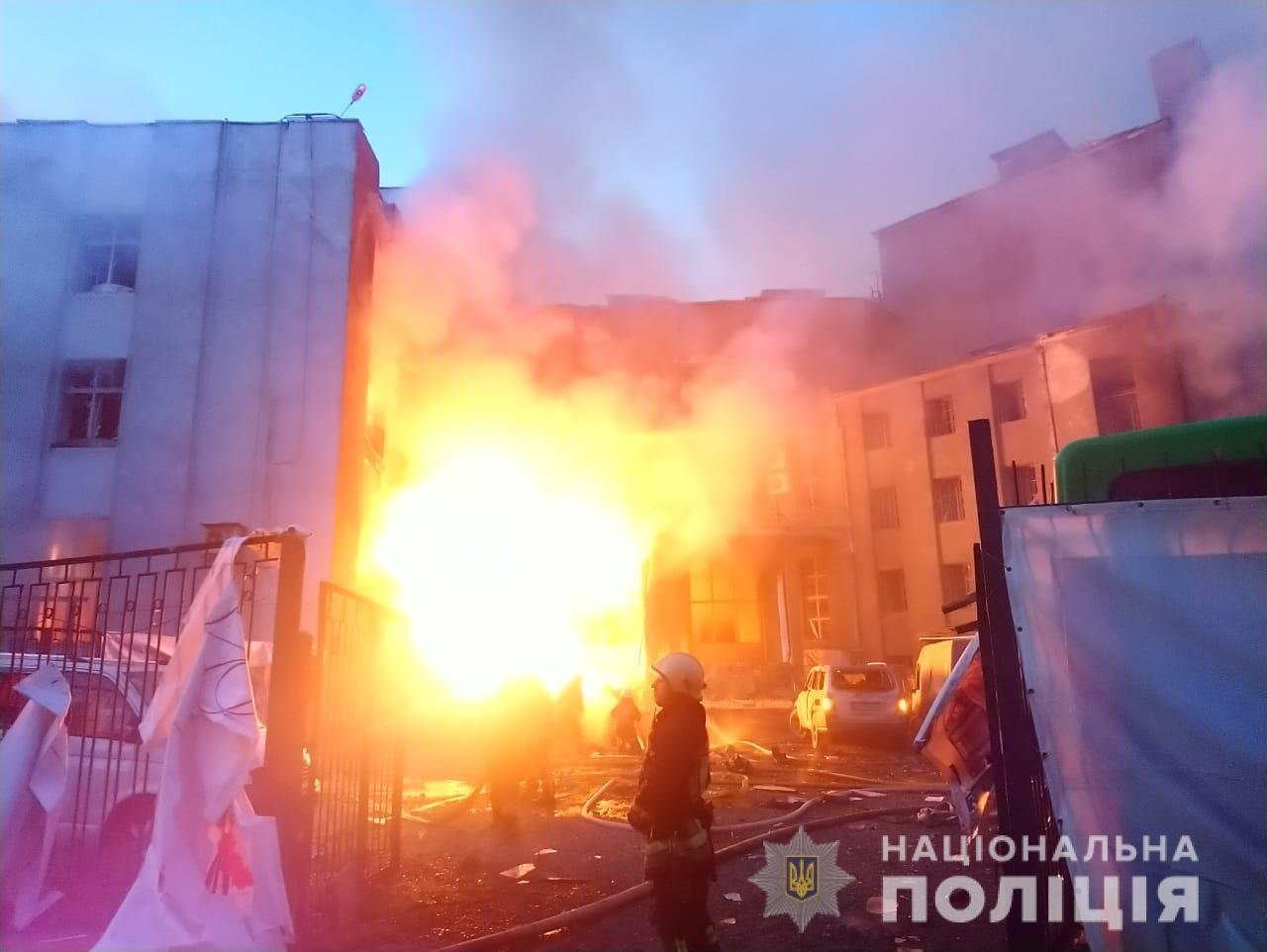
Palace of culture of railroad workers after Russian rocket strike on 18 August

On 17–18 August, 25 people were killed and several dozen were injured in a missile strike on two dormitories. Also on 18 August, new Russian strike destroyed Palace of culture of railroad workers.

19 August was proclaimed a day of mourning in the city for people killed in the preceding days. The same day, new rocket strike destroyed one of buildings of Kharkiv Polytechnic Institute, killing one person.

On 2 September 2022, a missile strike damaged Lokomotyv Sports Palace.

On 6 September 2022, Ukrainian forces launched a major counteroffensive. Three days later, Ukrainian troops liberated Izium, Balakliia and other settlements. Between 6 and 11 September alone, the Ukrainians claimed to have killed 2,850 Russian soldiers and to have destroyed up to 590 pieces of military equipment, including 86 tanks, 158 armoured combat vehicles, 106 artillery systems and 159 vehicles. Forty-six other equipment systems were also lost, including 6 planes and 7 helicopters. According to Oryx, they also captured an additional 129 pieces of military equipment.

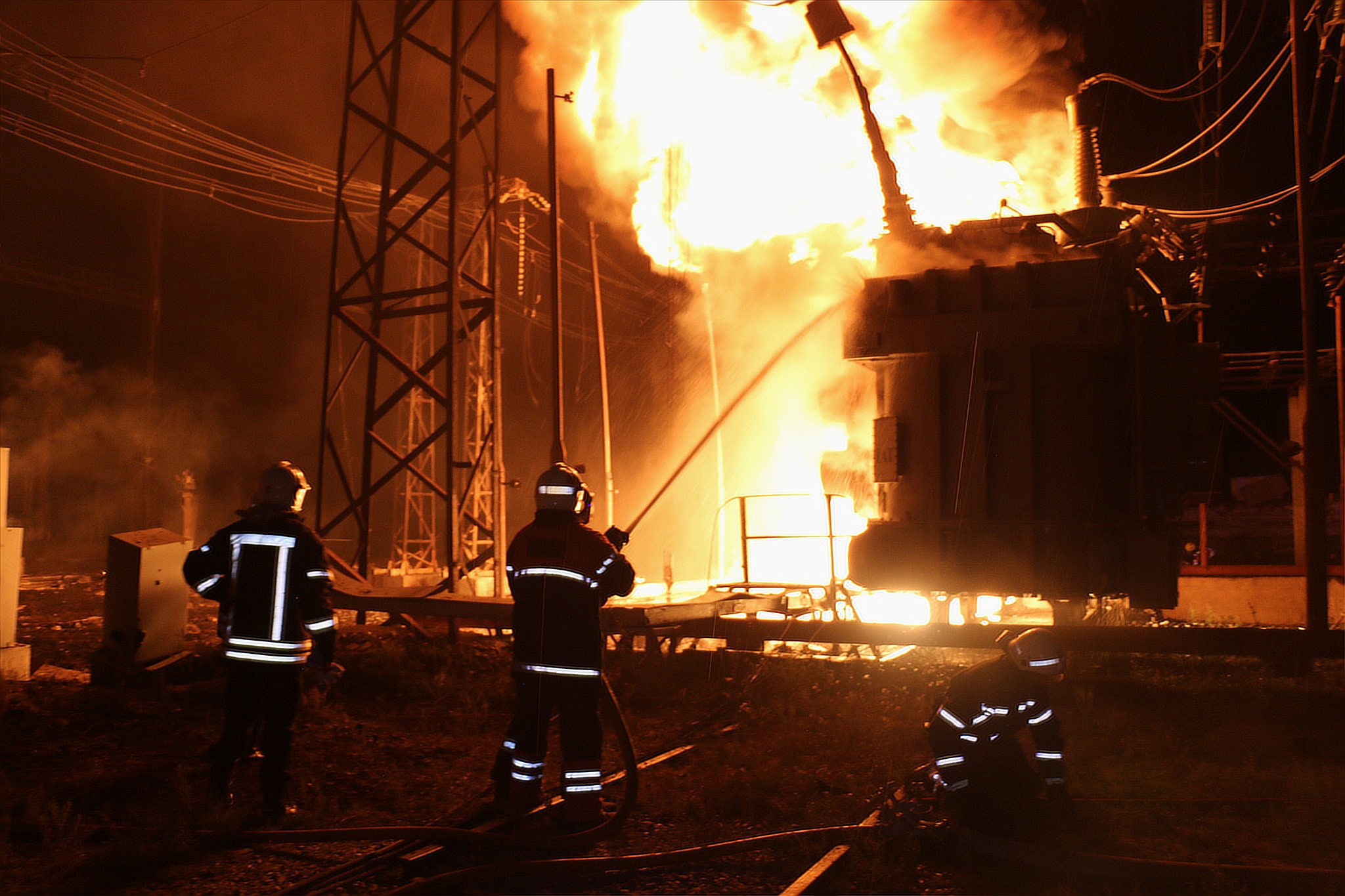
Fire after shelling of Kharkiv TEC-5

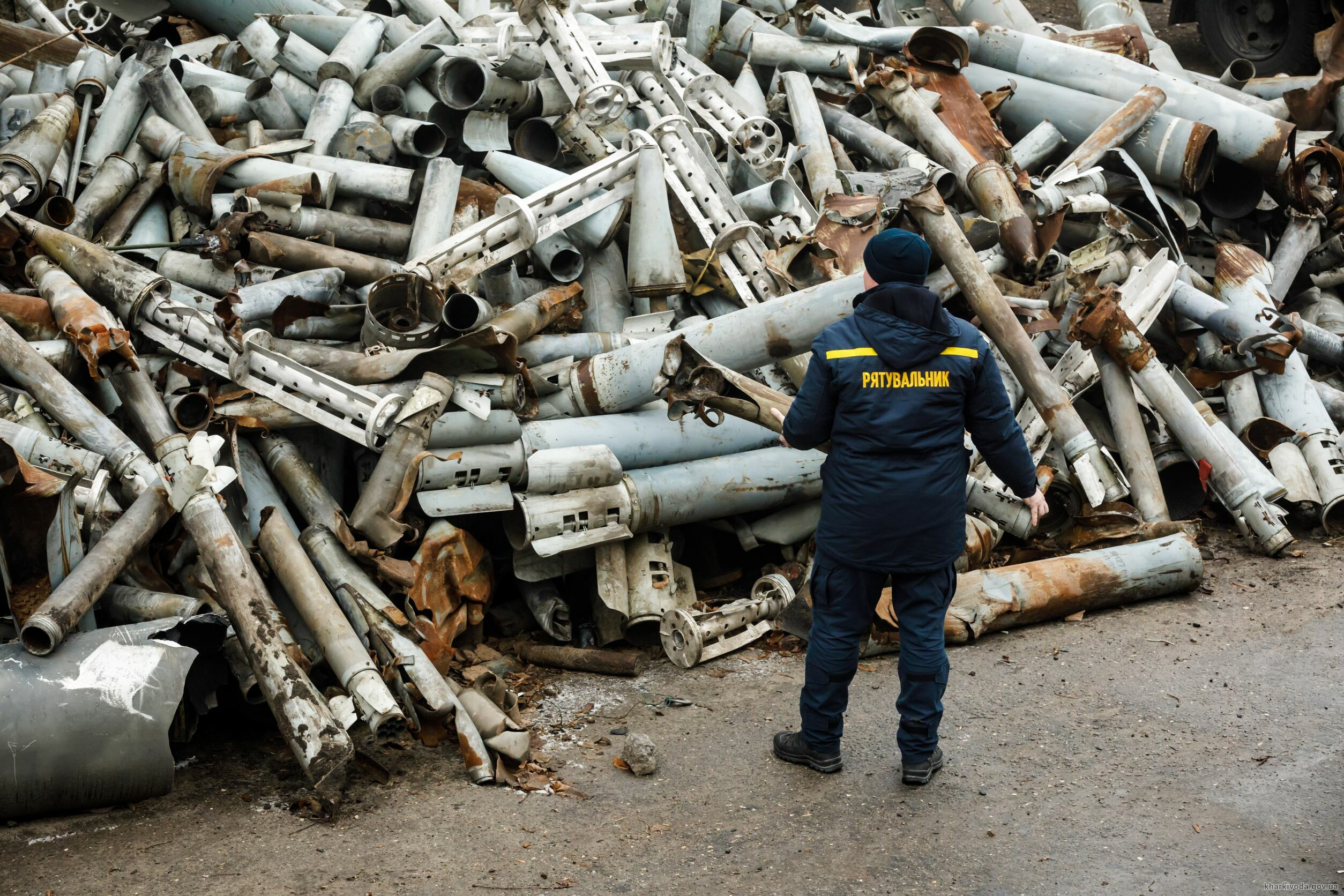
Remains of rockets fired on Kharkiv

Fields in Kharkiv region strewn with craters after the battle

On 11 September, Russian army shelled infrastructure facilities in central and eastern Ukraine, including Kharkiv TEC-5 and Zmiiv thermal power station in Kharkiv region. This caused extensive power outages in five regions of Ukraine and is thought to be the response to the Ukrainian counteroffensive.

== Casualties ==
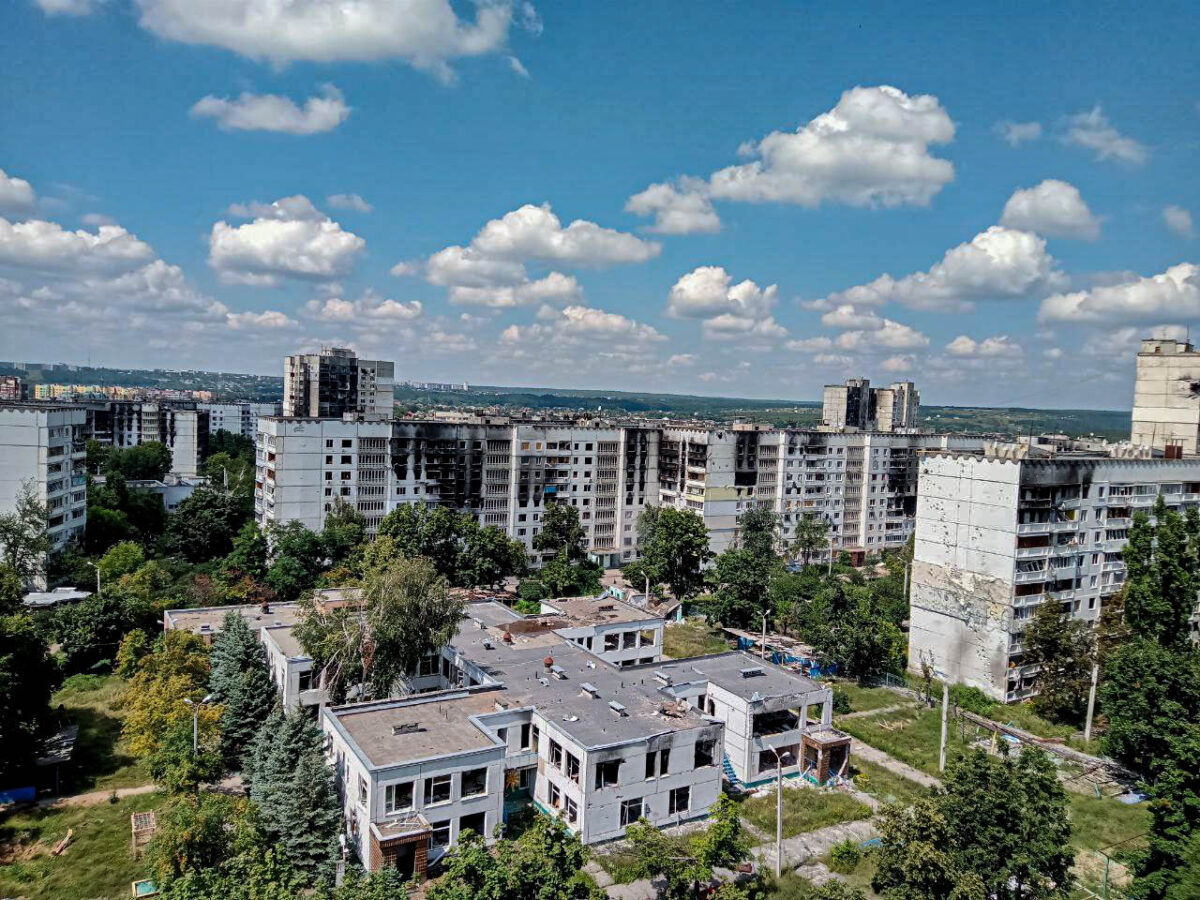
Northern Saltivka after the battle

=== Civilian casualties ===
During the battle, at least 606 civilians were killed due to Russian shelling and fighting for the city. Due to the fog of war, it is impossible to tabulate total casualties for the Battle of Kharkiv. Additionally, various skirmishes around Kharkiv's suburbs have led to casualties for both the Russian and Ukrainian Armed Forces.

=== Military casualties ===
Like the civilian death toll, the true number of military casualties is impossible to estimate due to the fog of war and opposing governments' inflation or deflation of numbers to boost morale.

During the course of the battle, the Ukrainian government claimed to have killed over 4,000 Russian troops. On 3 March, Ukraine claimed to have destroyed a 120-man unit of airborne soldiers. On 5 March, Ukraine counterattacked and claimed to have wiped out the 144th Guards Motor Rifle Division's 488th Motor Rifle Regiment, killing around 1,600 Russian soldiers, with the rest of the division reportedly being pushed back across the border into Russia. On 26 March, Ukraine claimed to have killed 645 soldiers from a single battalion tactical group from the 200th Separate Motor Rifle Brigade. Reportedly, only three men survived, two of whom were wounded. 30 units of military equipment were also destroyed, including armoured vehicles and trucks. On 29 March, Ukraine claimed to have completely destroyed 2 battalion tactical groups, also from the 200th Brigade, and inflicted casualties on others, killing more than 1,500 soldiers. On 15 March, the Ukrainians reported that they had killed Igor Nikolaev, commander of the 252nd Motorized Rifle Regiment, and claimed two days later that they had destroyed around 30% of the regiment's 900–2,000 personnel and equipment.

On 21 May, in a statement the Ukrainian police confirmed the recovery of the bodies of six military officials, including a Russian colonel, in the settlement of Zolochiv. On 30 May, the Ukrainians repatriated the bodies of a further 62 Russian servicemen in the Kharkiv Region.

According to documents captured by the Ukrainians, the 1st Guards Tank Army lost 308 military vehicles (including 131 tanks), or between one-quarter and one-half of its strength, in the first three weeks of fighting for Kharkiv. A breakdown of these losses by Business Insider revealed "that the 1st Guards Tank Regiment (part of the 2nd Motor-Rifle Division) lost 45 out of its 93 upgraded T-72B3M tanks—i.e. nearly 50% of its combat strength. The 4th Tank Division's three manoeuvre regiments lost 65 T-80U and T-80UE tanks, and six T-72BVs. That's around 33% of its expected strength of 200–217 tanks. The 27th Motor-Rifle brigade lost nine of its 31 T-90A tanks (29%). Infantry fighting vehicles losses are also startling with the loss of battalion equivalent each of BMP-2 infantry fighting vehicles and BTR-80 wheeled APCs across three motor-rifle regiments". Also according to the document, the army's manpower losses in the first two weeks of the war alone were 61 Russians killed and 209 wounded. In addition, 44 Russian tankmen went missing, and 96 were captured, with the total casualties of the 1st Tank Army amounting to 409 soldiers.

On 19 October 2023, the Ukrainians, reflecting on the defence of Kharkiv, claimed that "the 92nd Brigade, the National Guard, border guards, cadets, students and [local] people burned 20,000 of their convoys, destroyed them and so on".

The Russian government, on the other hand, gave very sparse updates as to Ukrainian casualties but claimed to have killed up to 276 Ukrainian fighters by 2 April, including 130 mercenaries.

== War crimes ==
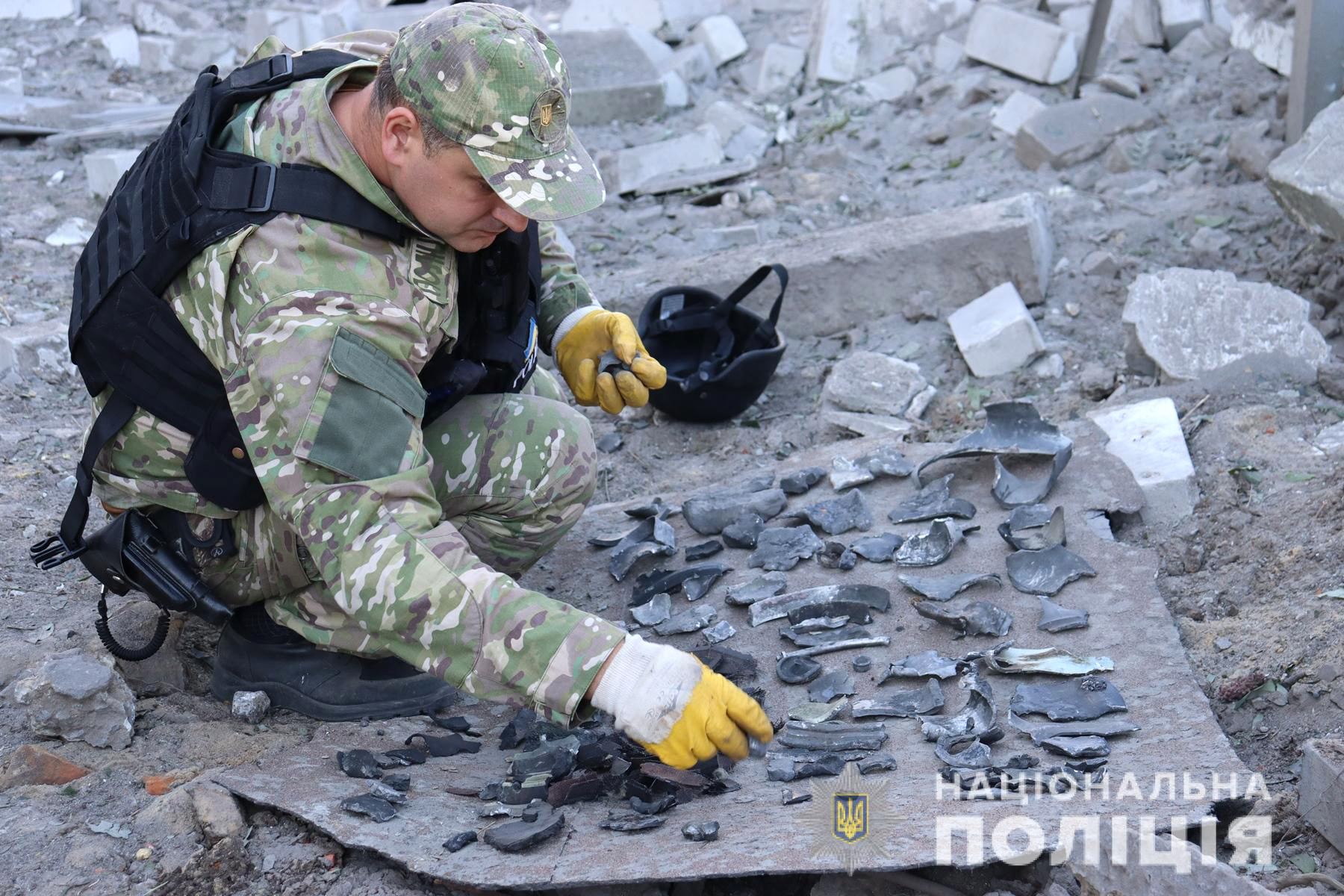
Ukrainian policeman examines collected remains of the S-300 rocket in Lokomotyv Sports Palace in Kharkiv

On 13 June, Amnesty International published a report saying that Russian forces had carried out a "relentless campaign of indiscriminate bombardments" in the battle, including the use of cluster munitions, scatterable land mines, and Grad rockets. Amnesty stated that these attacks constituted war crimes and potentially represented deliberate targeting of civilians.

== See also ==
- Russian occupation of Kharkiv Oblast
- List of military engagements during the Russian invasion of Ukraine
