= 302nd Anti-aircraft Missile Brigade =

302nd Anti-aircraft Missile Brigade (2024-) 302nd Anti-aircraft Missile Regiment (2015-2024) 3020th Anti-aircraft Missile Divisions Group (2014–2015) 302nd Anti-Aircraft Missile Regiment (2002–2014) 148th Anti-aircraft Missile Brigade (1992—2002)
- 302-га зенітна ракетна бригада
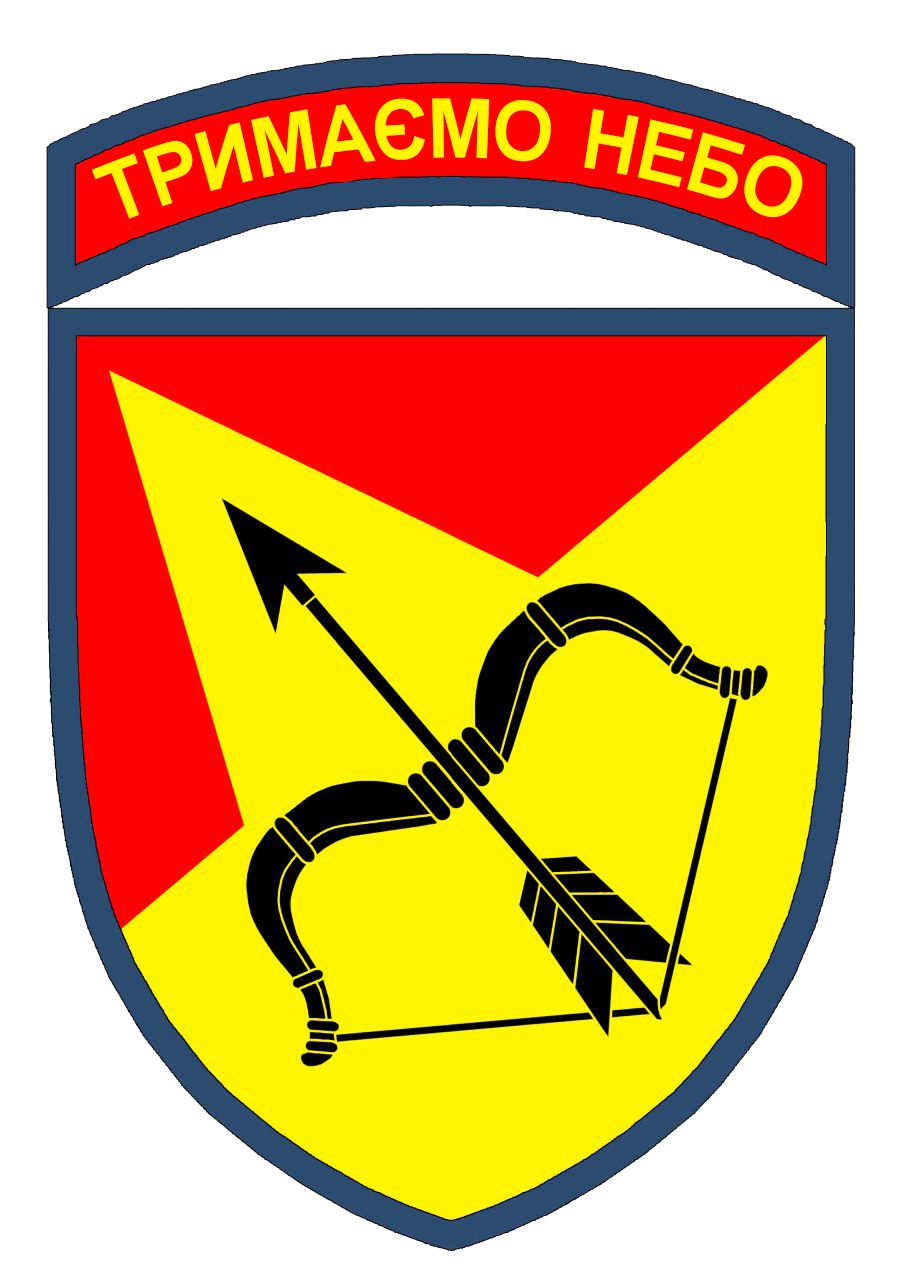
- Active: 1992 – present
- Country: Ukraine
- Allegiance: Armed Forces of Ukraine
- Branch: Ukrainian Air Force
- Type: Brigade
- Role: Anti-Aircraft
- Part of: Air Command East
- Garrison/HQ: Kharkiv
- Nickname: Kharkiv Regiment
- Motto: "We hold the sky"
- Equipment: S-300PS and S-300PT
- Engagements: Russo-Ukrainian war: War in Donbas; Russian invasion of Ukraine
- Decorations: For Courage and Bravery

Commanders
- Current commander: Colonel Ihor Kolesnik

Insignia
- Former Insignia

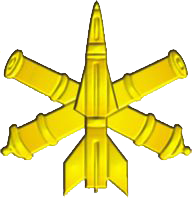
- Collar Insignia

The 302nd Anti-aircraft Missile Brigade "Kharkiv" is a brigade of the Ukrainian Air Force tasked with air defense operations throughout Kharkiv Oblast. It operates S-300PS and S-300PT Missile defense systems and is subordinated to the Air Command East. It is headquartered at Kharkiv.

== History ==
In January 1992, following the Dissolution of the Soviet union, the 148th Anti-aircraft Missile Brigade of the Soviet Army took an oath of loyalty to Ukraine and became the 302nd Anti-aircraft Missile Regiment in December 2002.

In January 2014, the 3020th group of anti-aircraft missile divisions was created on the basis of the 302nd and 301st Anti-aircraft Missile Regiment and became a part of the 138th Anti-aircraft Missile Brigade (Ukraine)

During the War in Donbass, the 301st Anti-aircraft Missile Regiment came out of subordination of the 138th Brigade, becoming a separate military formation within the Air Command East and was deployed from 2015 to 2017 in Donbass.

On 23 August 2021, on the occasion of the 30th anniversary of Ukrainian independence, the regiment was given the honorary name "Kharkiv".

On 24 February 2022, at the start of the Russian invasion of Ukraine, the regiment's positions were shelled by Russian forces killing a soldier of the regiment (Vergulenko Ihor Serhiyevich). On 27 February 2022, during the Battle of Kharkiv, Russian Ministry of Defence spokesman Igor Konashenkov claimed that Russian forces had secured the surrender of the Ukrainian 302nd Anti-Aircraft Missile Regiment and captured 471 Ukrainian soldiers, a claim that was disputed by Ukrainian officials. In April 2022, a soldier of the brigade (Andriy Myroslavovych Osinskyi) was killed in a battle with Russians at an undisclosed location. The regiment participated in the 2022 Kharkiv counteroffensive and on 15 September 2022, a soldier of the regiment (Oleksiy Gennadiyovych Venchenko) was killed in a battle with Russians near Hurakove. On 5 October 2022, the 302nd Anti-aircraft Missile Regiment "Kharkiv" shot down three Iranian-made HESA Shahed 136 Kamikaze UAVs.

On 16 May 2024 two soldiers of the regiment (Note: And also a married couple) (Zhitnikov Kyrylo Vyacheslavovich and Mizyak Tamila Ivanivna) were killed as result of Russian shelling on the regiment's positions.

== Structure ==
- Management & HQ
- 3021st Anti-aircraft Missile Division (S-300PS) (Kharkov)

3022nd Anti-Aircraft Missile Division (S-300PT) (Rohan)

- 3023rd Anti-aircraft Missile Division (S-300) (Kulinichi)
- 3024th Anti-aircraft Missile Division (S-300PT) (Ruska Lozova)
- Guardian Platoon
  - Anti-aircraft Missile Department
  - Machine gun Department
  - Anti-aircraft Artillery Department
- Medical center

== Commanders ==
- Lieutenant Colonel Andriy Viktorovych Novozhilov (2016–2017)
- Colonel Ihor Kolesnik (2017-)

== Sources ==
- Символіка 302 зенітного ракетного ордена Червоної Зірки полку
- Форум mil.in.ua
- 302-й зенитно-ракетный полк (в/ч А-1215) (Харьков)
