= Aremallapur =

Village in Karnataka, India

Aremallapur is a village in the southern state of Karnataka, India. It is located in the Ranebennur taluk of Haveri district in Karnataka.

== Demographics ==
The 14.63°N latitude, 75.75°E longitude are the geocoordinate of the Aremallapura. As of 2001 India census, Aremallapur had a population of 3563 and as of 2011 India census, it had a population 4785. Majority of the population is Kshatriyas Maratha by caste.

== Official language ==
The native language of Aremallapur is Kannada, most of the village peoples speak in Kannada. These people use Kannada for communication.

== Location ==
Aremallapur is located 16 km from Ranebennur via Madleri road. 14.63°N latitude, 75.75°E longitude. Aremallapur is at the heart of the surrounding villages, it is surrounded from Yekalasapura, Hirebidari, Airani, Yellapura T.M, Konanatambigi, Somalapura, Karura, Chelageri and Madleri.

== Economy ==
Most people are engaged in agriculture and related activities.

== Regional attractions ==
Landmarks in Aremallapur include Lakes, Hill stations and temples. such as,

- Channammana katti (Lake, donated to village by Channamma Surve)
- Halekeri (Lake)
- Hosakeri (Lake)
- Bettada Mallikarjuna (Hill temple)
- Shri Kottureswara swami (Hill temple)
- Shri Siddharoodha swami (Hill temple)
- Tulja Bhavani temple
- Kariammadevi temple: a temple of Gramadevathe
- Uchchangemmadevi temple
- Uppinamaali Choudeshwari temple
- Veerabhadreshwara temple
- Mallikarjuna temple
- Hanuman temple
- Beereshwara temple
- Durgambhadevi temple
- Kallappa (Kalleshwara) temple
- Sharanabasaveshwara temple and Matha
- Shri Siddharoodha swami temple
- Mathangi temple
- Horabeereshwara temple
- Mylara Lingeshwara Shibhara

Some of the major surrounding regional attractions are:

- Ranibennur Blackbuck Sanctuary, 12 km away from Aremallapur.
- Airani Fort (6 km)
- Tungabhadra River (6 km)
- Vanakeri Mallayya temple at Somalapur, Ranebennur (Tq). 5 km away from Aremallapur.
- Shri Muppinarya Swami Matha, Airavata, Airani, Ranebennur (Tq). 8 km away from Aremallapura.
- The Temple of Mukteswara at Chaudayyadanapura; built in the 11th or 12th century in the Jakkanachari style (25 km)
- Harihareshwara Temple at Harihar (30 km)
- Karibasaveshwara Temple (Ajjayya) at Ukkadagatri (33 km)

== Gram Panchayat ==
As of 2011 census information the location code or village code of Aremallapur village is 604499. Aremallapur village is located in Ranibennur Tehsil of Haveri district in Karnataka, India. It is situated 14 km away from sub-district headquarter Ranibennur and 51 km away from district headquarter Haveri. As per 2009 stats, Aremallapura is the gram panchayat of Aremallapur village.

The total geographical area of village is 1345.18 hectares. Aremallapur is a large village located in Ranibennur Taluka of Haveri district, Karnataka with total 1031 families residing. The Aremallapur village has population of 4785 of which 2442 are males while 2343 are females as per Population Census 2011.

In Aremallapur village population of children with age 0-6 is 539 which makes up 11.26% of total population of village. Average Sex Ratio of Aremallapur village is 959 which is lower than Karnataka state average of 973. Child Sex Ratio for the Aremallapur as per census is 953, higher than Karnataka average of 948.

Aremallapur village has lower literacy rate compared to Karnataka. In 2011, literacy rate of Aremallapur village was 74.66% compared to 75.36% of Karnataka. In Aremallapur Male literacy stands at 81.16% while female literacy rate was 67.88%.

As per constitution of India and Panchyati Raaj Act, Aremallapur village is administrated by Sarpanch (Head of Village) who is elected representative of village.

== Post Office ==
Aremallapur Post Office is located at Ranebennur, Haveri District, Karnataka. Pin Code of Aremallapur Branch Office is 581115. Aremallapur Post Office Type is B.O. More details about Aremallapur Branch Office are given below.

== Connectivity ==
Aremallapur has good Road, Rail connectivity surrounding villages and cities. Chelageri is the nearest railway station.

== See also ==
- Ranebennur
- Haveri
- Karnataka
