= 5th Slobozhanska Brigade =

5th Separate Slovozhansk Brigade
- 5-та окрема бригада НГ (Ukrainian)
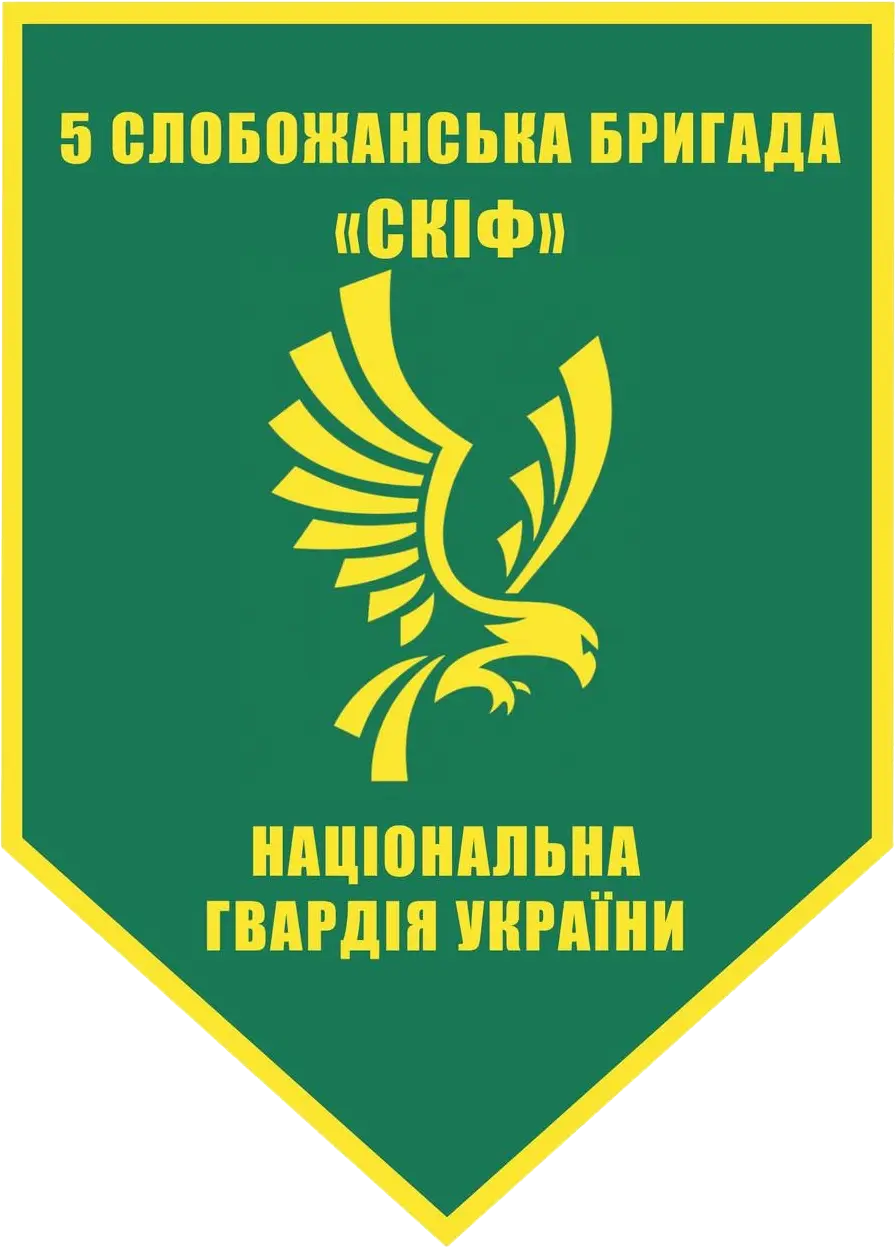
- Brigade Insignia
- Founded: 1992
- Country: Ukraine
- Allegiance: Ministry of Internal Affairs
- Branch: National Guard of Ukraine
- Type: Brigade
- Role: Extraction, logistical and combat support, maintenance of the public law and order, protection of citizens' safety, administrative buildings, General Consulates and the Ukrainian territorial integrity
- Part of: National Guard of Ukraine
- Garrison/HQ: Kharkiv
- Nickname: Slovozhansk
- Engagements: Transnistrian conflict Russo-Ukrainian war: War in Donbas; Russian invasion of Ukraine; Battle of Kharkiv; 2022 Kharkiv counteroffensive; Eastern Ukraine campaign

Commanders
- Current commander: Colonel Mykhailo Yakobchuk

Insignia
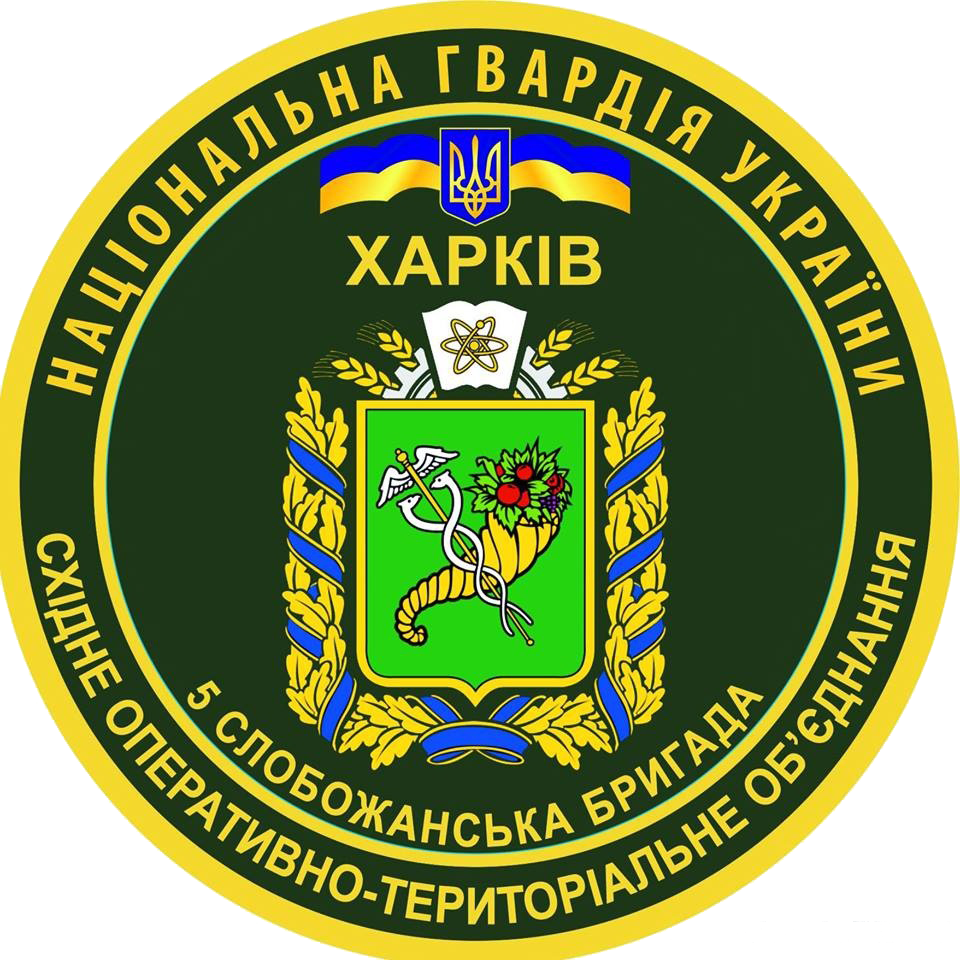
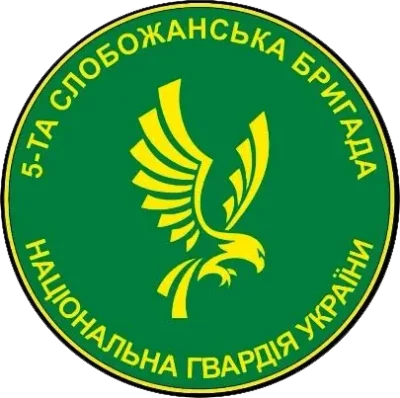
- Former Insignia

The 5th Separate Mixed Slovozhansk Brigade is a brigade of the National Guard of Ukraine concerned with multiple roles including the extraction of Ukrainian personnel from the frontlines, logistical and combat support, maintenance of the public law and order, the protection of citizens' safety, administrative buildings and General Consulates amongst other roles. It was established on the basis of the 20th Convoy Brigade in February 1992 as the 5th Convoy Brigade. It is headquartered in Kharkiv

== History ==
Brigade tank crew with their T-64

On 2 January 1992, the 5th Separate Convoy Brigade was established on the basis of the 20th Separate Red Banner Convoy Brigade of the Internal Troops of the Soviet Union.

The servicemen of the unit, in addition to performing the routine tasks, participated in many rescue and security operations. In 1992, the brigade defended the Ukrainian border in Odessa Oblast during the Transnistrian conflict. In April 1995, it participated in the cleanup operations form Dykaniv sewage treatment plant spillover. In May 1995, it took part in extinguishing forest fires in the Kharkiv Oblast.

It was then transferred to the Internal Troops of Ukraine.

On 21 February 2000, the brigade was given the honorary name "Slobozhan Brigade".

In 2014, it was again transferred to the National Guard of Ukraine after its reestablishment and took part in the War in Donbass since 201r. On 8 September 2014, a checkpoint near Mount Karachun in Yasnohirka, manned by the 5th brigade's personnel was attacked by separatists killing a soldier of the brigade,(Yurii Oleksandrovych Andrienko).

In 2015, the combat support battalion of the brigade was disbanded.

On 4 April 2017, a soldier of the brigade (Vadim Tretyakov) was killed while serving in Zaitseve.

Following the Russian invasion of Ukraine, the brigade is known to have taken part in the Battle of Kharkiv and the 2022 Kharkiv counteroffensive. On 5 March 2022, the brigade's HQ in Kharkiv were struck by Russian forces killing an officer (Kuguk Evgeny Ivanovich) and a soldier (Denis Yuriyovych Mazhugin) of the brigade. In September 2022, the brigade liberated the cities of Balakleya and Izium and then operated in the Luhansk Oblast. On 8 July 2023, during a combat mission in Kreminna, the brigade's positions were shelled killing a soldier of the brigade (Gerasikov Evgeny Mykhailovych).

== Structure ==
- 5th Separate Slovozhansk Brigade
  - Patrol Battalion
    - 1st Patrol Company
    - 2nd Patrol Company
    - 3rd Patrol Company
    - 4th Patrol Company
  - Rifle Battalion
    - 1st Rifle Company
    - 2nd Rifle Company
    - 3rd Rifle Company

== Commanders ==
- Colonel Yury Makarchuk

Colonel Serhii Uniyatov (2017–2019)

- Colonel Oleg Savych (2019–2022)
- Colonel Mykhailo Yakobchuk (2022-)

== Sources ==
- Харківські гвардійці отримали посвідчення учасників бойових дій
- Харківські гвардійці попрощалися з почесним ветераном України
