= Kharkiv dormitories missile strike =

August 2022 missile attack in Ukraine

- Part of the bombing of Kharkiv in the Battle of Kharkiv during the Russian invasion of Ukraine
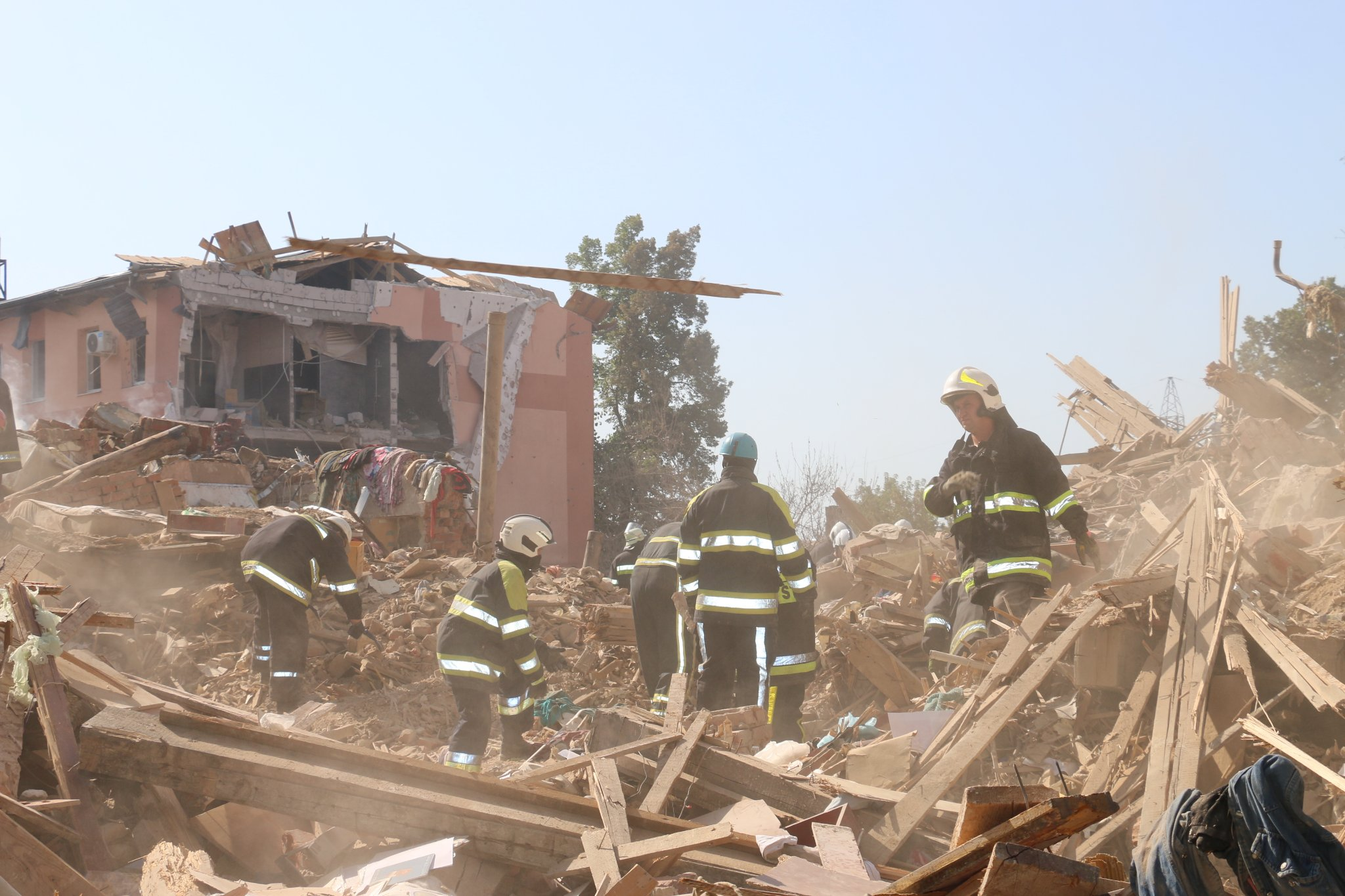
- Dormitory in Saltivskyi District after the strike
- Location: Kharkiv, Ukraine
- Date: 17–18 August 2022 (UTC+3)
- Target: Residential dormitories
- Attack type: Missile strike
- Deaths: 25 (including one child)
- Injuries: 44 (including 3 children)

The missile strike on dormitories in Kharkiv was performed by Russian aviation with a series of missiles in the evening of 17 August and in the morning of 18 August 2022. This became one of the largest attacks on Kharkiv and one of the most tragic nights of the city. The impact killed 25 people including an 11-year old boy. 44 were injured (including three children).

== Background ==
At the very beginning of the 2022 Russian invasion of Ukraine, Russian soldiers tried to capture the city, but failed; Kharkiv has been subjected to almost constant shelling by artillery shells and rockets since then.

== Course of events ==
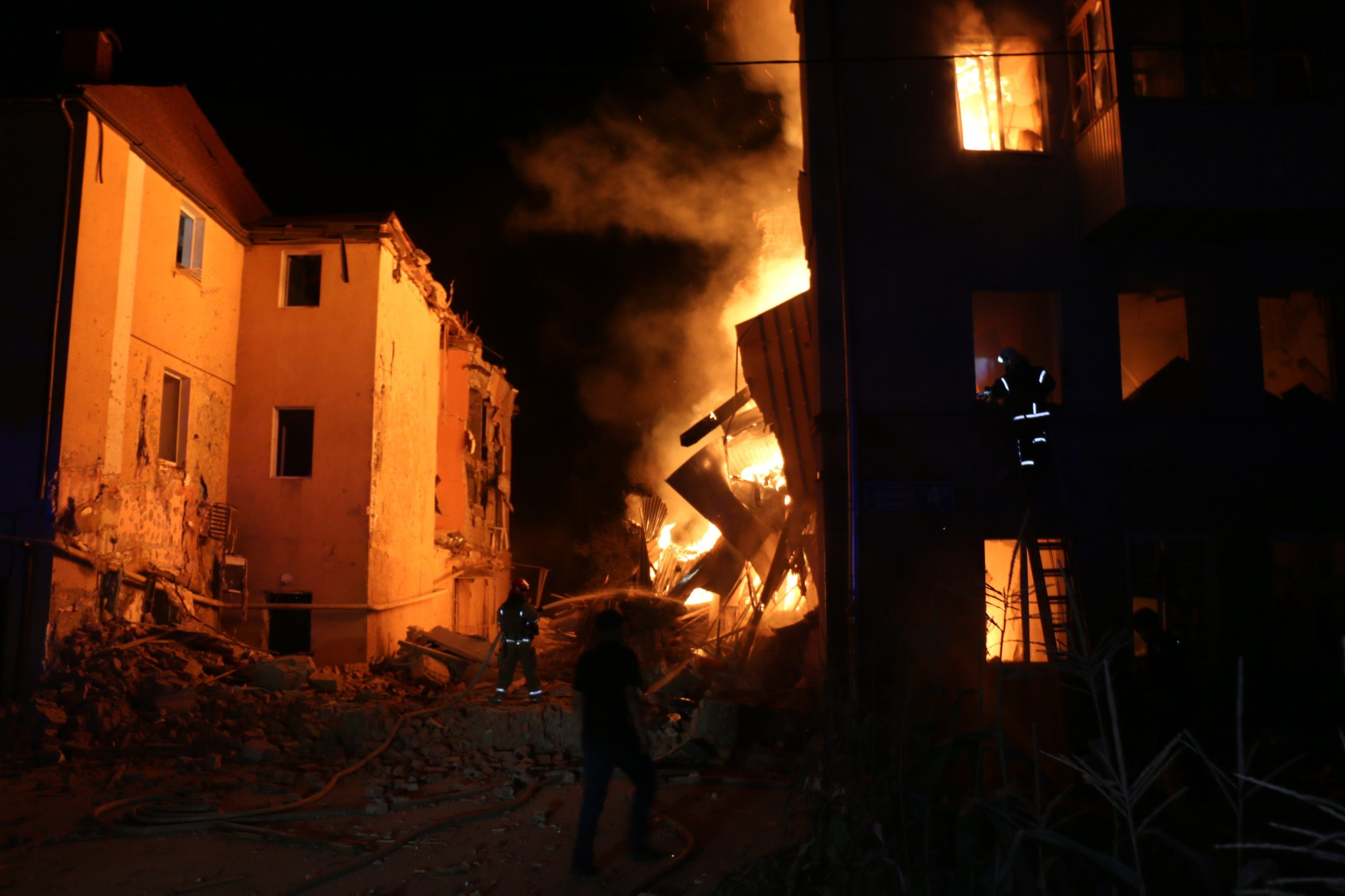
Dormitory in Saltivskyi district in the day of the strike

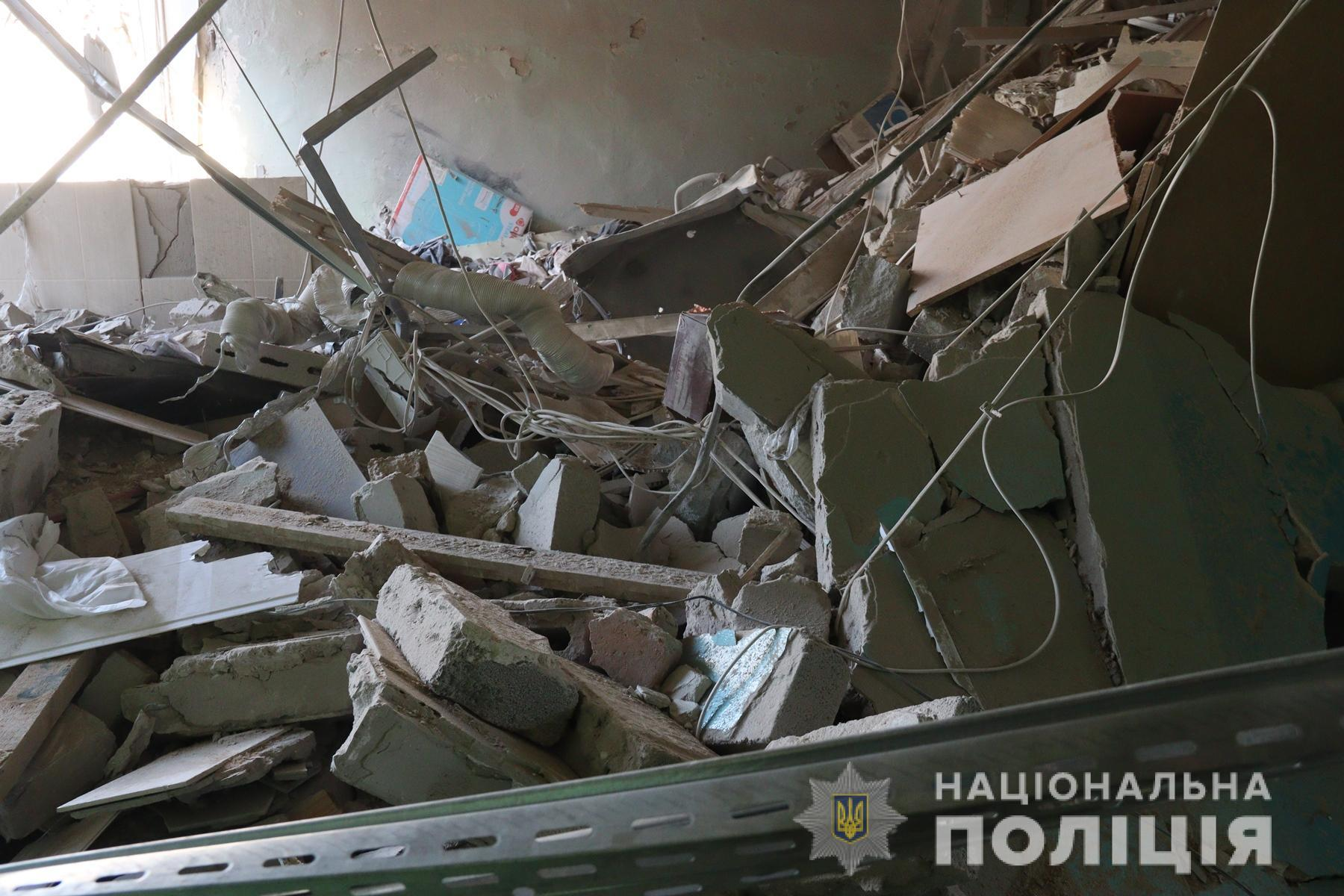
Dormitory in Slobidskyi district after the strike

On 17 August 2022, at 4:30 a.m., several rockets were fired from Belgorod on the Slobidskyi and Saltivskyi districts of Kharkiv. In the Slobidskyi District, a four-story hostel of a tram depot was hit together with adjacent repair workshop and neighboring non-living building.

The second missile attack was carried out at 21:30 and destroyed a three-story hostel in the Saltivskyi district, where people with hearing impairments lived. The missile attack caused a fire, and the building was completely destroyed.

== Victims ==
In the Slobidskyi district, on the day of the tragedy it was known that two people were killed and 18 were injured, including two children. Subsequently, the bodies of six people were excavated from under the ruins. Ten units of fire and rescue equipment worked at the scene of the shelling along with forty rescuers of the State Emergency Service.

In the Saltivskyi district, 19 people were killed and 22 injured, including an 11-year-old child.

== Reactions ==
=== Ukraine ===
President of Ukraine Volodymyr Zelenskyy said: “When you hear about Kharkiv Saltivka, it’s pain again. Pain for all Ukraine. Pain for Kharkiv,” he wrote. “Rocket attack… On the hostel… The building is completely destroyed.” The President described the killing of residents as "a vile and cynical blow to civilians, which has no justification and demonstrates the impotence of the aggressor".

According to the head of the military administration of the Kharkiv region, Oleh Synyehubov: “The Russians brutally and purposefully attacked civilians. And now in their so-called "media" they are spreading another fake about "military facilities". There are no military installations. Exclusively civilian facilities, including pensioners and children. This is real terrorism, which only fiends are capable of!”.

=== Russia ===
The Russian Defense Ministry confirmed the missile attack on Kharkiv in its briefing. According to their version, “a high-precision ground-based weapon hit a temporary base for foreign mercenaries” and as a result, “more than 90 militants were destroyed”.

== Mourning ==
On August 19, mourning was declared in Kharkiv in memory of those killed by Russian shelling.
