= Borys Romanchenko =

Ukrainian survivor of Nazi concentration camps (1926–2022)

- Борис Романченко
- Born: Borys Tymofiyovych Romanchenko; 20 January 1926; Bondari, Konotop Okruha, Ukrainian SSR, Soviet Union
- Died: 18 March 2022 (aged 96); Kharkiv, Ukraine
- Known for: Nazi concentration camp survivor

Borys Tymofiyovych Romanchenko (Ukrainian: Борис Тимофійович Романченко; 20 January 1926 – 18 March 2022) was a Ukrainian public figure, activist and a survivor of several Nazi concentration camps: Buchenwald, Dora and Bergen-Belsen. He was killed by Russian airstrikes during the Battle of Kharkiv during the 2022 Russian invasion of Ukraine.

== Biography ==
Romanchenko was born on 20 January 1926 in Sumy Oblast, Ukrainian SSR.

At age 16, Romanchenko was captured and deported to Dortmund in Nazi Germany, where he had to perform forced labour in a coal mine. After a failed attempt to escape, he was interned at Buchenwald concentration camp. Later, he was forced to work in the production of V-2 rockets at Peenemünde Army Research Center. He was transferred to Mittelbau-Dora concentration camp and finally liberated at Bergen-Belsen concentration camp. After returning home, he studied in Kharkiv.

After surviving three Nazi concentration camps, Romanchenko actively shared his memories of those events and was involved in preserving the memory of tragedies caused by the Nazis. He was vice-president (from Ukraine) of the International Committee of Former Prisoners of Buchenwald-Dora. Romanchenko also repeatedly visited the place of his imprisonment, noting that although it is difficult to stay there, it is a rare opportunity to see those who survived the camps.

On 12 April 2015, he spoke at the site of the former Buchenwald concentration camp, citing from the Buchenwald Oath in Russian: "Наш идеал — построить новый мир мира и свободы" ("Our ideal is building a new world of peace and freedom").

== Death ==
He was living in the Saltivka area of Kharkiv at the time of his death on 18 March 2022.

His granddaughter Yulia Romanchenko said that there was shelling in the area and when she went to his house it was completely burned down. The Ukrainian foreign minister Dmytro Kuleba commented on Twitter: "Unspeakable crime. Survived Hitler, murdered by Putin."

== Commemoration ==
The City Council of Leipzig in Germany decided on 9 November 2022 to rename the street "Turmgutstraße" in the area Gohlis in Leipzig, where also the Consulate General of the Russian Federation resides, in honor to Romanchenko to "Boris-Romantschenko-Straße".
