= Yasnohirka =

Yasnohirka (Ukrainian: Ясногірка) may refer to several places in Ukraine:

- Yasnohirka, Donetsk Oblast, urban-type settlement in Kramatorsk Raion
- Yasnohirka, Rivne Oblast, village in Sarny Raion
- Yasnohirka, Chudniv urban hromada, Zhytomyr Raion, Zhytomyr Oblast, village in Chudniv urban hromada, Zhytomyr Raion
- Yasnohirka, Pulyny settlement hromada, Zhytomyr Raion, Zhytomyr Oblast, village in Pulyny settlement hromada, Zhytomyr Raion
