= 138th Anti-aircraft Missile Brigade =

- 138-ма зенітна ракетна бригада
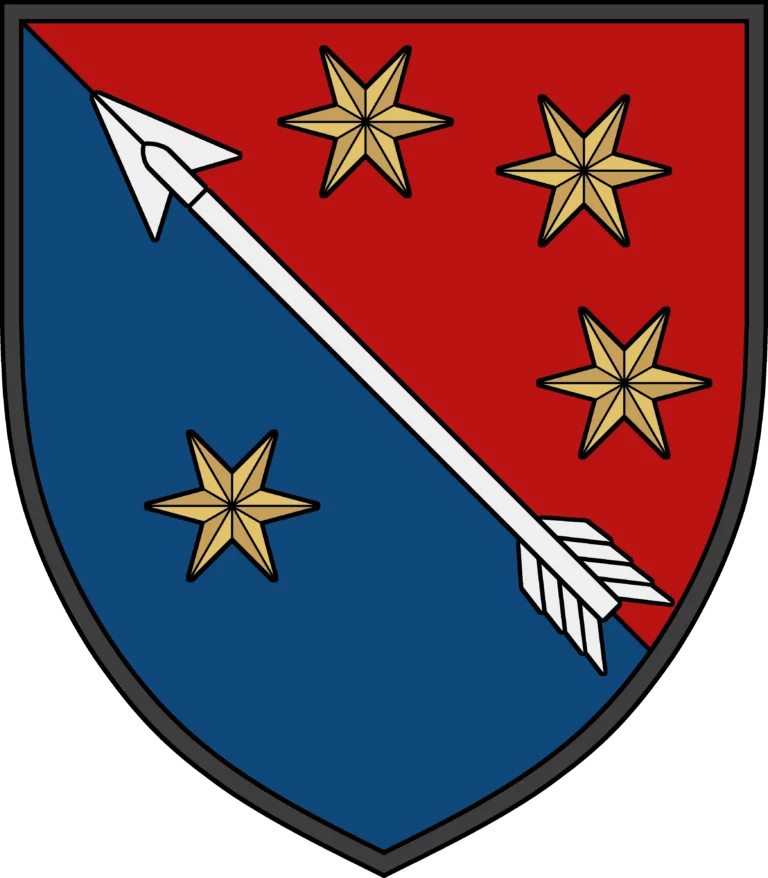
- Active: 1992 – present
- Country: Ukraine
- Allegiance: Armed Forces of Ukraine
- Branch: Ukrainian Air Force
- Type: Missile
- Role: Anti-Aircraft
- Part of: Air Command East
- Garrison/HQ: Dnipro
- Nickname: Dniprovska Brigade
- Equipment: S-300PS, S-300PT and Patriot
- Engagements: Russo-Ukrainian war: War in Donbas; Russian invasion of Ukraine
- Decorations: For Courage and Bravery

Commanders
- Current commander: Colonel Mykola Ivanovych Dziaman

Insignia
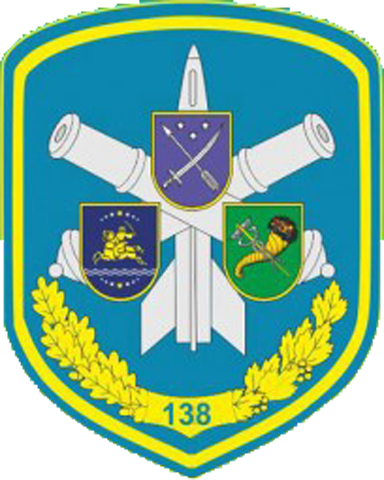
- Former Insignia

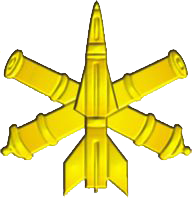
- Collar Insignia

The 138th Anti-aircraft Missile Brigade "Dniprovska" is a brigade of the Ukrainian Air Force tasked with air defense operations throughout Zaporizhzhia Oblast, Dnipropetrovsk Oblast, Poltava Oblast, Sumy Oblast, and Kharkiv Oblast. It operates S-300PS, S-300PT and Patriot missile systems and is subordinated to the Air Command East. It is headquartered at Dnipro.

== History ==
In 1992, following the dissolution of the Soviet union, the 138th Anti-Aircraft Missile Regiment came under the jurisdiction of Ukraine as its personnel took an oath of loyalty to the Ukrainian people.

Since 1988, the unit has been armed with S-300 medium-range anti-aircraft missile systems for defensive purposes. In August 2008, the regiment was awarded the honorary name "Dnipropetrovsk" by the decision of the Dnipropetrovsk City Council and Ministry of Defense of Ukraine. In 2013, the 138th regiment became the 138th brigade. In January 2014, the 301st Anti-aircraft Missile Regiment from Nikopol and the 302nd Anti-aircraft Missile Regiment from Kharkiv were assigned to the brigade but broke off as separate regiment's in 2014. On 23 August 2021, the President of Ukraine officially granted, the honorary name "Dniprovska" to the brigade.

On 24 August 2022, the brigade was awarded the honorary award "For Courage and Bravery".

On 22 May 2023, the brigade successfully intercepted a Russian Kh-101, which was the 100th successful interception by the brigade during the Russian invasion of Ukraine.

On 23 February 2024, the brigade destroyed a Beriev A-50 long-range AEW&C aircraft of the Russian Air Force in the airspace over Krasnodar for which the brigade's commander, Mykola Dzyaman, was declared as a wanted "terrorist" by the Investigative Committee of the Russian Federation in June 2024.

== Commanders ==
- (2013–2019) Colonel Berezhny Andriy Oleksandrovich
- Colonel Palaguta Vitaly Viktorovych (2019-?)
- Colonel Mykola Ivanovych Dziaman (?-)

== Sources ==
- Крила України No. 27 (690)
- Військові частини Повітряних Сил за родами військ
