= Yasnohirka, Rivne Oblast =

Yasnohirka Ясногірка
- Village
- Location of Yasnohirka Yasnohirka (Ukraine)
- Coordinates: 51°12′11″N 26°56′33″E
- Country: Ukraine
- Oblast: Rivne Oblast
- Raion: Sarny Raion
- Hromada: Vyry rural hromada
- Founded: 1730
- Elevation: 178 m (584 ft)

Population (2018)
  - Total: 1,521
- Time zone: UTC+2 (EET)
  - Summer (DST): UTC+3 (EEST)
- Postal code: 34553
- Area code: +380 3655

Yasnohirka (Ukrainian: Ясногірка) is a village in Sarny Raion, Rivne Oblast, western Ukraine.

== History ==
From 1795 until the collapse of the Russian Empire, Yasnohirka was administratively part of the Rovensky Uyezd of the Volhynian Governorate, and belonged to the Vyriv Volost. At the end of the 19th century the village had 47 estates and 341 inhabitants. As of 1859, there were 16 farms and 170 residents (85 men and 85 women), of whom 168 were Orthodox and 2 Jews in the proprietary settlement of Yasnohirka. In 1906, the distance Yasnohirka from the county town was 117 versts, and 3 from the parish. There were 45 yards, and 362 inhabitants.

== Demographics ==
Native language as of the Ukrainian Census of 2001:

- Ukrainian 99.54%
- Russian 0.46%
