= Shestakove =

Village in Kharkiv Oblast, Ukraine

Shestakove Шестакове
- Village
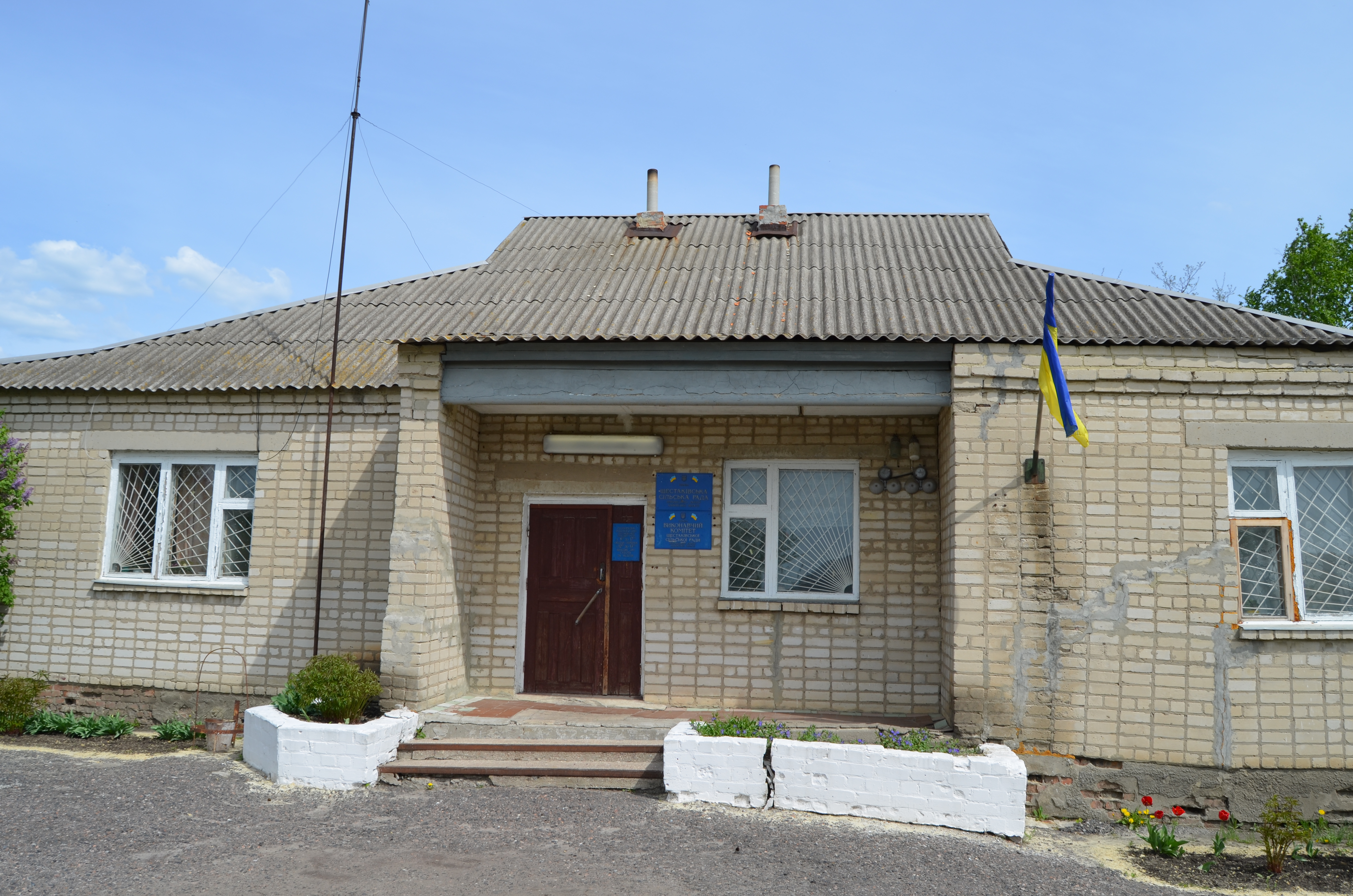
- Building of Shestakove village council
- Interactive map of Shestakove
- Location of Shestakove within Ukraine Shestakove (Ukraine)
- Coordinates: 50.071667°N 36.621667°E
- Country: Ukraine
- Oblast: Kharkiv Oblast
- District: Chuhuiv Raion
- Founded: 1675

Area
  - Total: 2.184 km^{2} (0.843 sq mi)
- Elevation: 150 m (490 ft)

Population
  - Total: 650 ▼
  - Density: 300/km^{2} (770/sq mi)
- Time zone: UTC+2 (EET)
  - Summer (DST): UTC+3 (EEST)
- Postal code: 62562
- Area code: +380 5741

Shestakove (Ukrainian: Шестакове; Russian: Шестаково; until 1968 Nepokryte (Непокрите)) is a village in Chuhuiv Raion (district) in Kharkiv Oblast of eastern Ukraine, at about 29.3 kilometres (18.2 mi) east-northeast from the centre of Kharkiv city.

Ukrainian forces recaptured the village from Russian forces on 5 May 2022, during the Russian invasion of Ukraine.
