= 301st Anti-aircraft Missile Brigade =

- 301-ша зенітна ракетна бригада
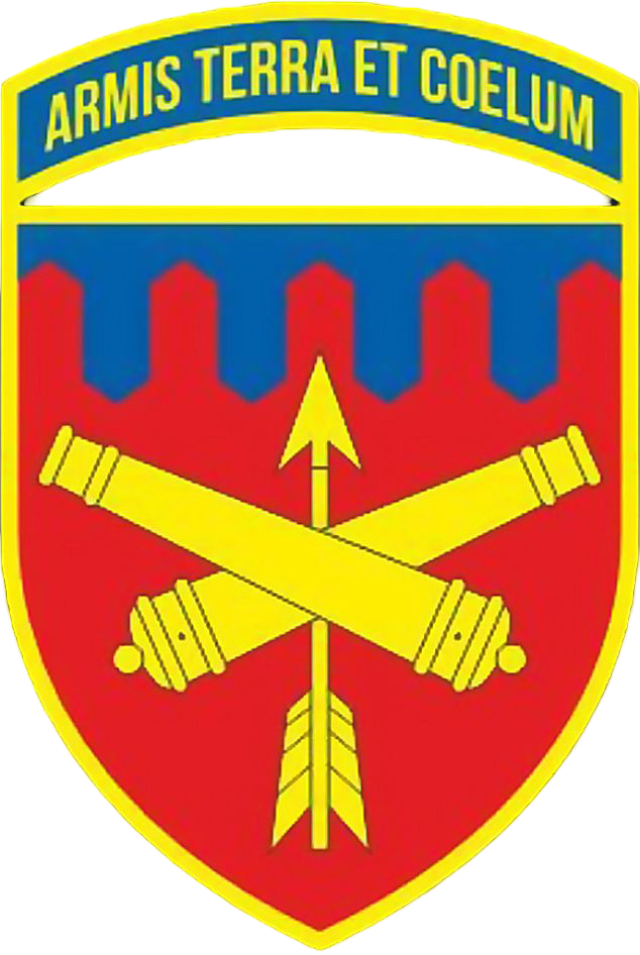
- Active: 1992 – present
- Country: Ukraine
- Allegiance: Armed Forces of Ukraine
- Branch: Ukrainian Air Force
- Type: Brigade
- Role: Anti-Aircraft
- Part of: Air Command East
- Garrison/HQ: Nikopol
- Equipment: S-300PS and S-300PT
- Engagements: Russo-Ukrainian war: War in Donbas; Russian invasion of Ukraine
- Decorations: For Courage and Bravery

Commanders
- Current commander: Colonel Andriy Mogilatenko

Insignia
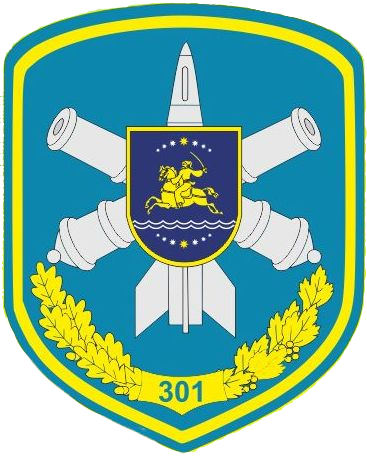
- Former Insignia

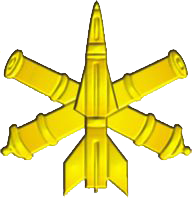
- Collar Insignia

The 301st Anti-aircraft Missile Brigade "Nikopol" is a brigade of the Ukrainian Air Force tasked with air defense operations throughout Donbass. It operates S-300PS and S-300PT Missile defense systems and is subordinated to the Air Command East. It is headquartered at Nikopol.

== History ==
In 1992, following the Dissolution of the Soviet Union, the personnel of the 269th Anti-aircraft Missile Brigade of the Soviet Army took an oath of loyalty to Ukraine.

In 2002, the 269th Anti-aircraft Missile Brigade became the 301st Anti-aircraft Missile Regiment.

In September 2010, during the military exercise "Interaction-2010" at Chauda, one of the divisions of the 301st Regiment destroyed all targets and received an "excellent" rating.

On 31 December 2013, the 301st regiment was transferred to the 138th Anti-aircraft Missile Brigade (Ukraine) in Kharkiv but in 2014 it again became a separate Anti-aircraft Missile Regiment.

In October 2015, the regiment celebrated its 50th anniversary.

In 2021, the regiment was deployed to Donetsk Oblast to take part in the War in Donbass.

On February 24, 2022, at the Start of the Russian invasion of Ukraine, at 5 A.M. the regiment's positions in Donetsk Oblast were struck by Russian warplanes followed by a second aerial assault at 9 A.M, the airstrikes led to the death of a soldier of the regiment (Oleg Yaskovets). The regiment participated and saw air defense and monitoring operations during the Siege of Mariupol during which equipment of the regiment Including radars was destroyed by Russian strikes. On 24 August 2022, the regiment was awarded the honorary award "For Courage and Bravery".

On 3 March 2023, the regiment shot down a Su-34 about 20 km from the front line near Yenakievo. One pilot was killed and the other severely wounded. On 5 August 2023, the regiment was awarded the honorary name "Nikopol" by decree of President Volodymyr Zelenskyy.

== Structure ==
- Management & HQ
- 3011th Anti-aircraft Missile Division (S-300PS)
- 3012th Anti-aircraft Missile Division (S-300PS)
- 3013th Anti-aircraft Missile Division (S-300PT)
- Logistics Company
- Repair and Maintenance Company
- Medical Center
- Command Post
- Technical Support Unit

== Commanders ==
- Colonel Sergey Dmytrovych Uryupov (2002–2004)
- Colonel Serhiy Voznesenskyi (2004–2006)
- Colonel Volodymyr Pavlovich Karpenko (2006–2013)
- Colonel Oleksandr Anatoliyovych Reznichenko (2013–2015)
- Colonel Andriy Mogilatenko (2015-)

== Sources ==
- Нікопольській військовій частині — 45 років!
- Повітряні Сили
