= Saltivskyi District =

Coordinates: 50.000°N 36.333°E

Saltivskyi District Салтівський район
- Urban district in Kharkiv
- Seal
- Interactive map of Saltivskyi District
- Country: Ukraine
- Oblast: Kharkiv Oblast

Government
  - Head of Administration: Olena Mezentseva (Kernes Bloc — Successful Kharkiv)

Area
  - Total: 31.61 km^{2} (12.20 sq mi)

Population
  - Total: 302,600
- Time zone: UTC+2 (EET)
  - Summer (DST): UTC+3 (EEST)

1. Kholodnohirskyi District; 2. Shevchenkivskyi District; 3. Kyivskyi District; 4. Saltivskyi District; 5. Nemyshlianskyi District; 6. Industrialnyi District; 7. Slobidskyi District; 8. Osnovianskyi District; 9. Novobavarskyi District

Saltivskyi District (Ukrainian: Салтівський район) is an urban district of the city of Kharkiv, Ukraine, named after Saltivka residential area.

The district was created in 1937 when Petynsko-Zhuravlivskyi District was split into Kahanovychskyi and Stalinskyi districts. In 1961 Stalinskyi District was renamed to Moskovskyi. On 11 May 2022, during the 2022 Russian invasion of Ukraine, it was renamed to Saltivskyi due to the previous name's association with Moscow. Saltivka had been one of the worst affected areas of the city during the Battle of Kharkiv.

== Industry and trade ==
33 industrial enterprises operate in the district, among them are JSC "Avtramat", JSC "Hlibozavod Saltivskyi", JSC "HELZ", LLC "Promelectro". Previously, there was also the Kharkiv Engine-Building Plant "Sickle and Hammer". Nowadays there is a vacant lot on the territory of the enterprise.

== Education and science ==
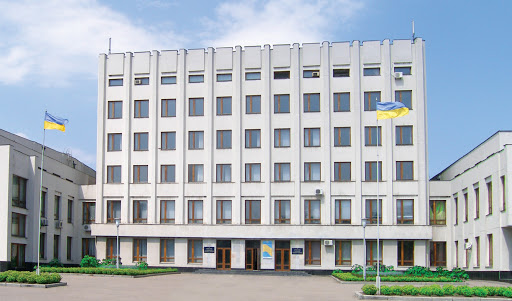
Main building of the Institute of Public Administration

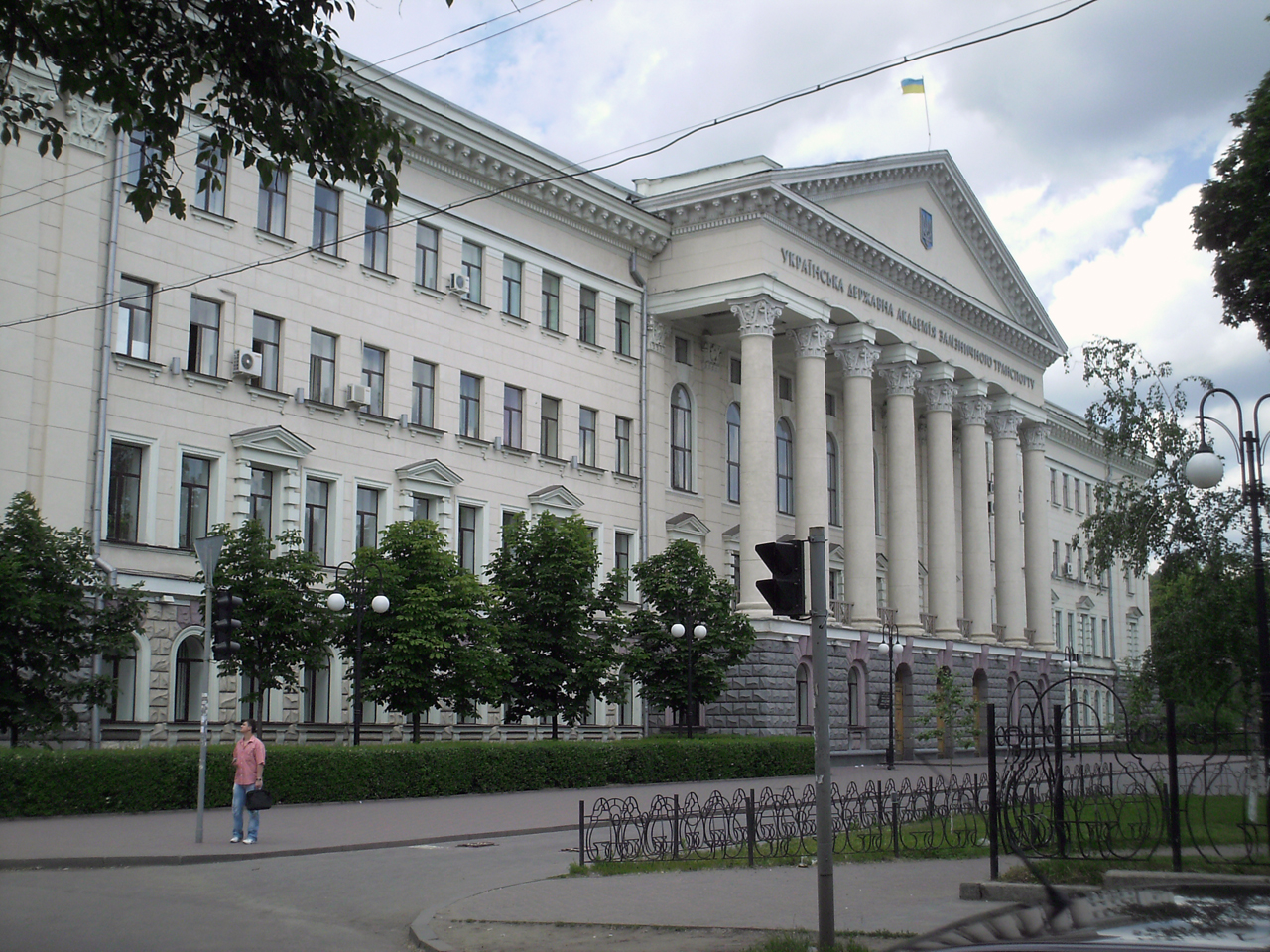
Ukrainian State University of Railway Transport

There are 8 research institutes in the Saltivskyi district, among which the leading ones in their fields are the Research and Design, Institute of Electrical Engineering Technology, the Research Institute of Laser Technologies, the Research Institute of Neurology, Psychiatry and Narcology, the Research Institute of Health Care children and teenagers.

The education system in the district is represented by all types of educational institutions.

- NNI "Institute of Public Administration" Kharkiv National University named after V.N. Karazin;
- Ukrainian State University of Railway Transport;
- 7 vocational and technical educational institutions and the educational and production center of the Vocational Institute No. 2, in which about 7,000 students study.

There are 37 secondary schools in the district, in which about 25,000 children study, including about 600 children in private schools, and more than 2,500 teachers work. 11 museums of military and patriotic education and historical and local history have been created in schools.

There are 32 preschool educational institutions in the district, of which 27 are of general development, 3 are of the combined type, 1 is of the sanatorium type, and 1 is of the specialized type. They educate more than 6 thousand children.

== Culture ==
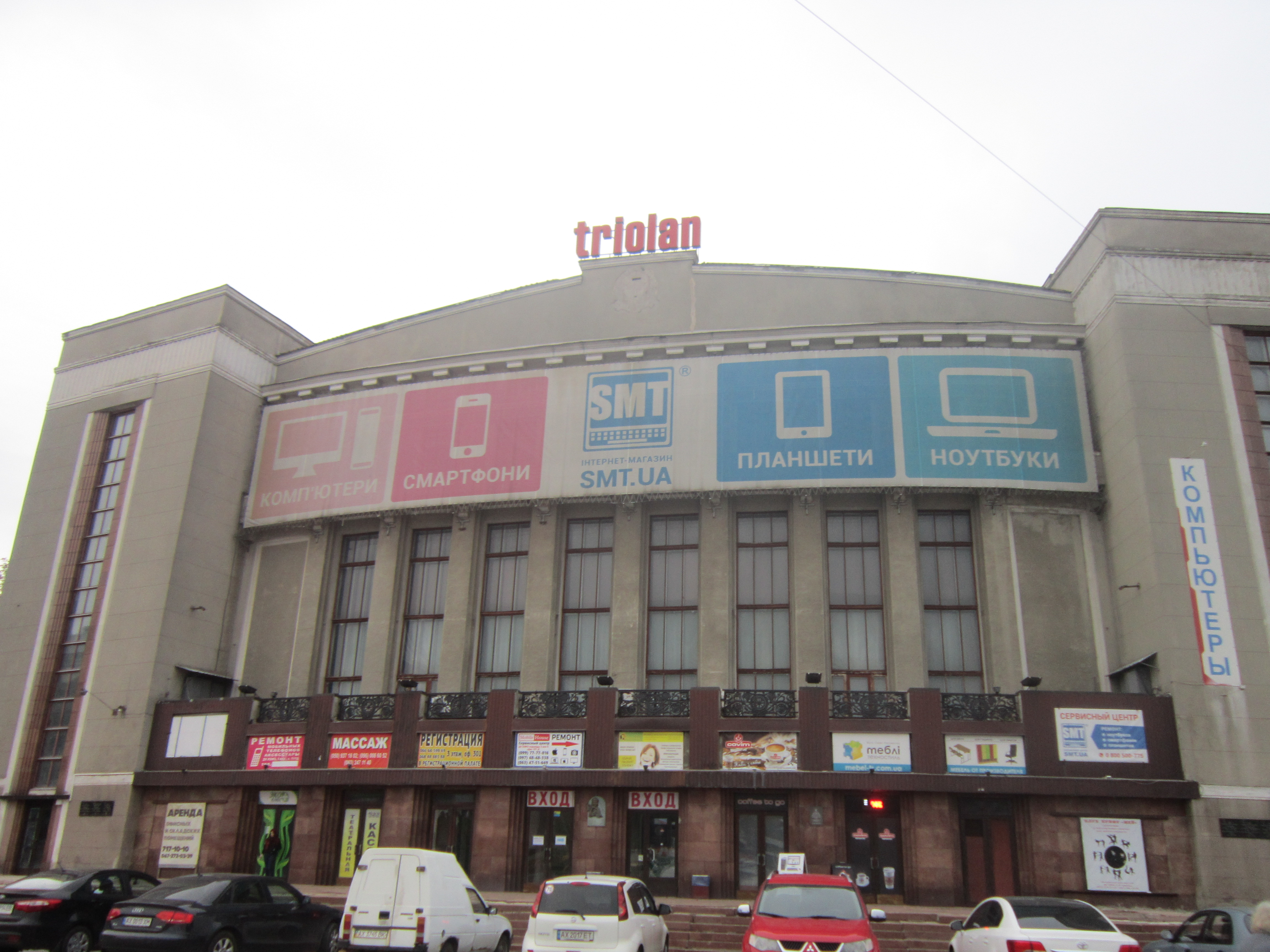
Palace of Culture of NPP "KHEMZ"

There are 23 cultural institutions in the district, including

- youth club "Peer" (with branch "Zmina" and OSP),
- children's art school No. 2 named after Levchenko,
- children's music school No. 15 named after Mozart with one branch,
- children's art school No. 3 with two branches,
- the central library network, which unites 13 mass libraries, the book fund of which is more than 100,000 copies,
- Palace of Culture of NPP "KHEMZ".

On the territory of the district are located: city museum named after Klavdiya Shulzhenko; the Kharkiv regional fire-technical exhibition, the only district museum-diorama "Afghanistan — how it was" in Ukraine, an exposition of the history of the Saltivskyi District is open.

== Health care ==
About 370,000 residents of Saltivskyi, Nemyshlyanskyi, Slobidskyi, and Kyivskyi districts of the city of Kharkiv are provided with medical care in 9 medical and preventive institutions of the district.

== Sport ==
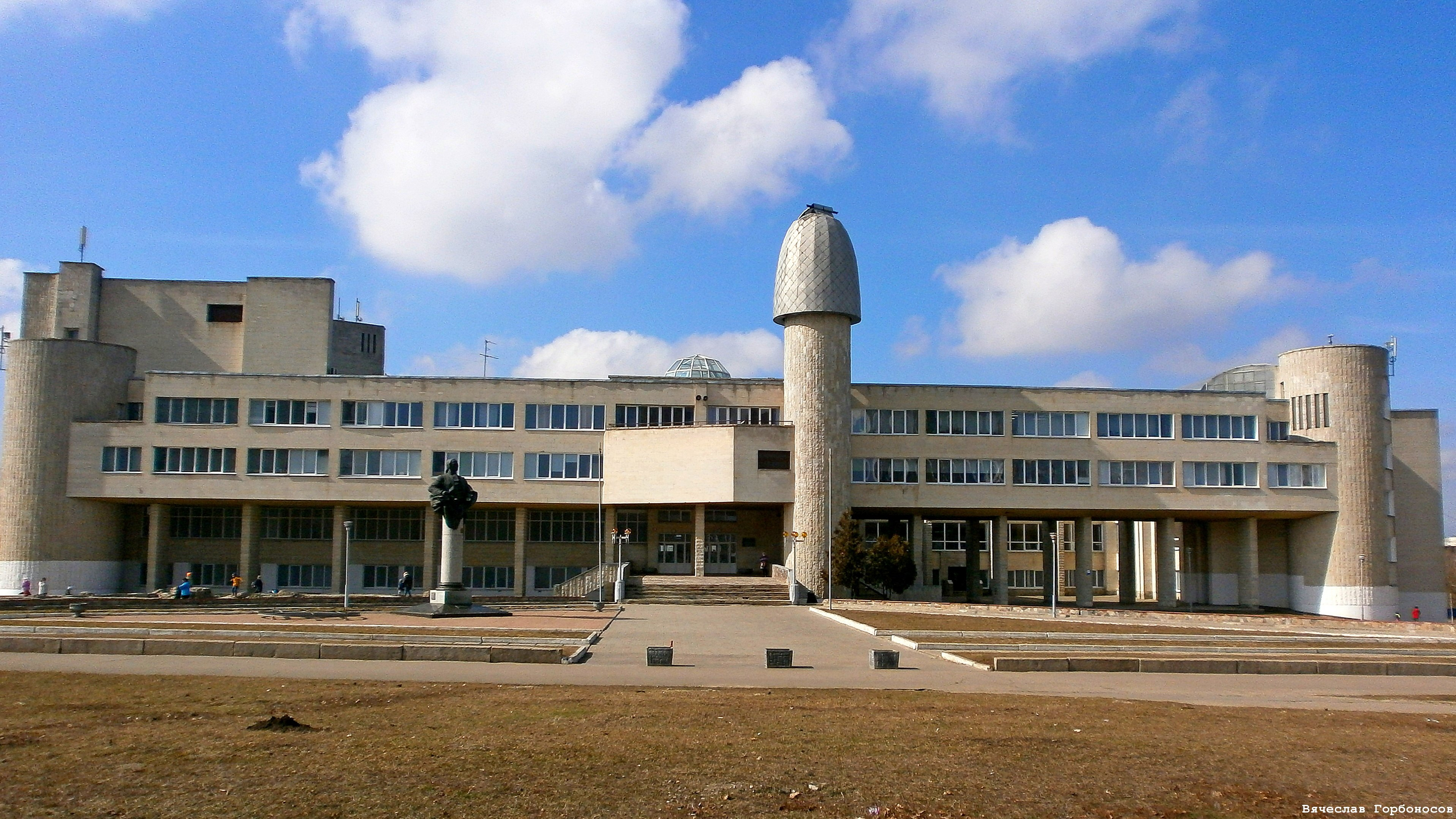
Kharkiv Palace of Children's and Youth Creativity

In the district, there are 2 sports schools, a club of young sailors, and an after-school education center "Mriya", in which about 5,500 children are engaged.

There are about 10 clubs at the place of residence, which are visited by about 2,000 teenagers.

The Kharkiv Palace of Children's and Youth Creativity is located on the territory of the district, where various sports sections, circles, creative groups are organized, in which more than 5 thousand children are engaged.

== Places ==
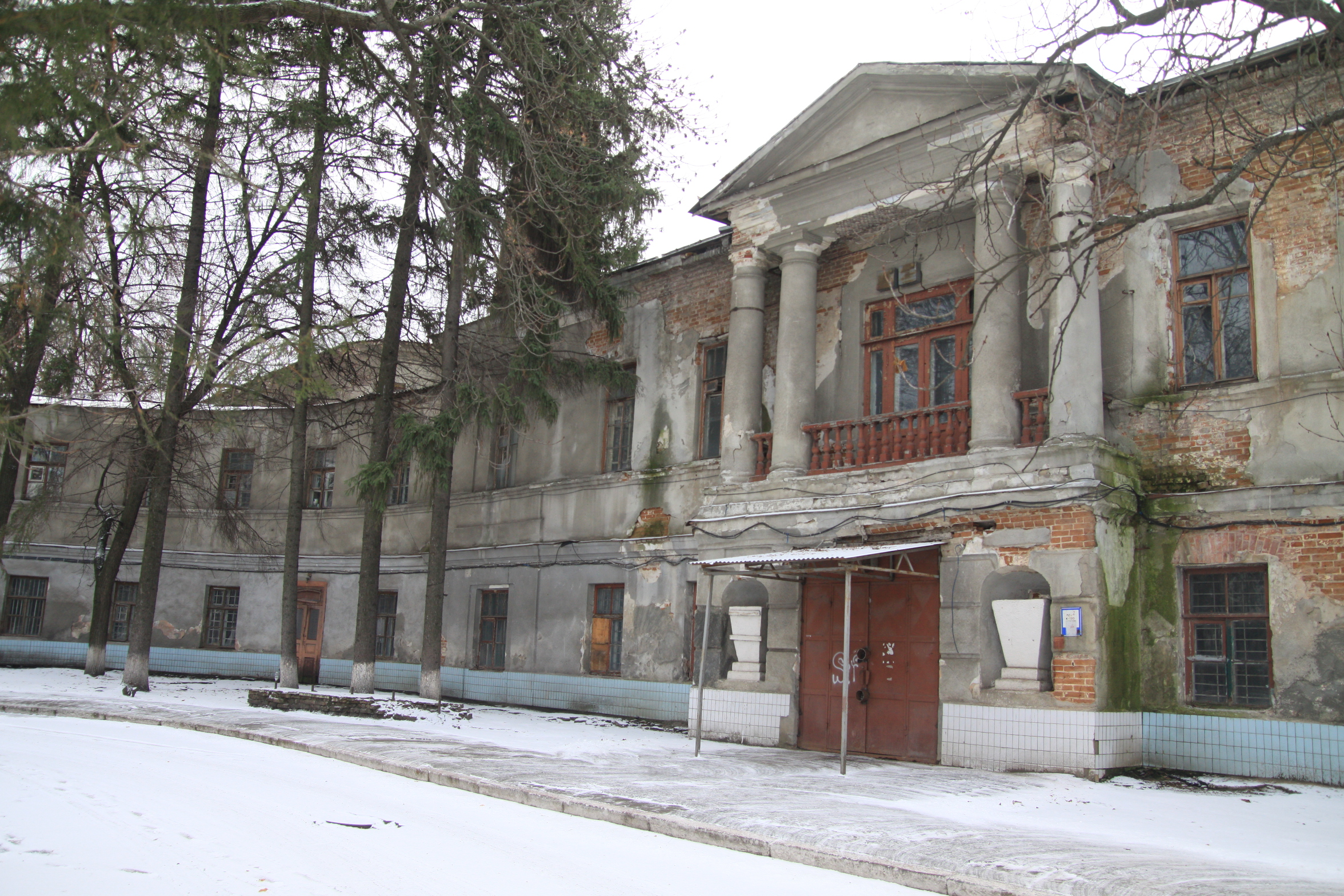
Saburova dacha (Psychiatric Clinical Hospital № 3)

- Saburova dacha
- selyshche imeni Kirova
- Yevheniivka
- Saltivka: Pershe Saltivske selyshche, Pivnichna Saltivka
- micro-districts: 601, 603, 604, 606, 531, 533, 521
- Rodnyky

== Notable people from Saltivskyi District ==
- Eduard Limonov – Russian writer, leader of the National Bolshevik Party (1943–2020)
- Serhiy Zhadan – Ukrainian poet, novelist, essayist, and translator
- Stepan – Ukrainian celebrity cat
- Mykhailo Dobkin – Ukrainian politician
- Sergey Chigrakov – Russian musician and songwriter
- Elena Yakovleva – Russian actress

== Gallery ==
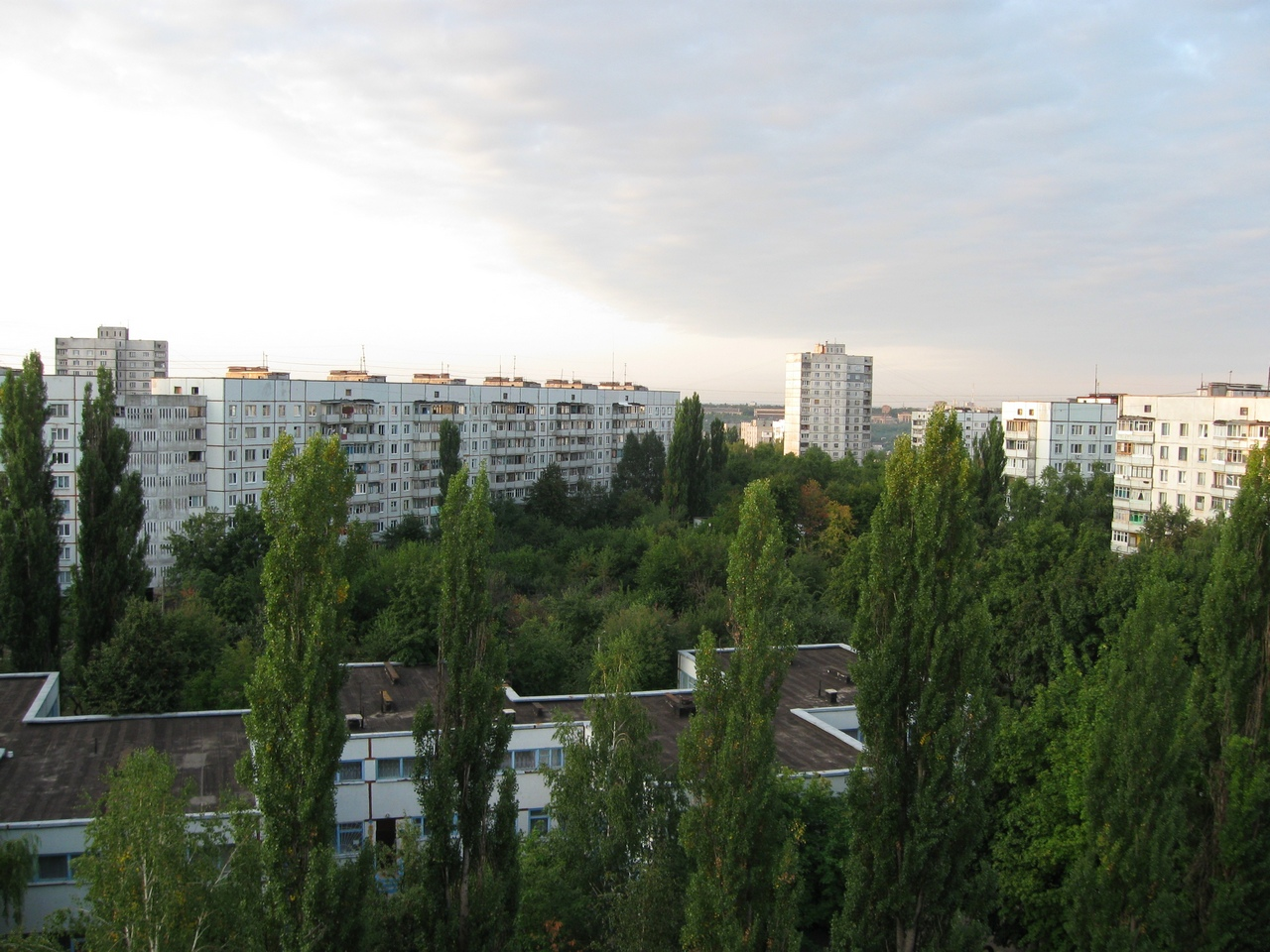
Microdistrict 624 in Saltivka

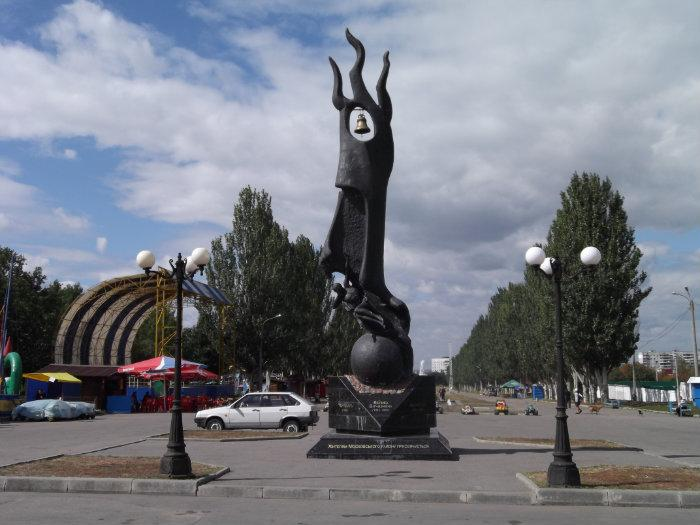
Monument to the fallen residents of Saltivskyi district

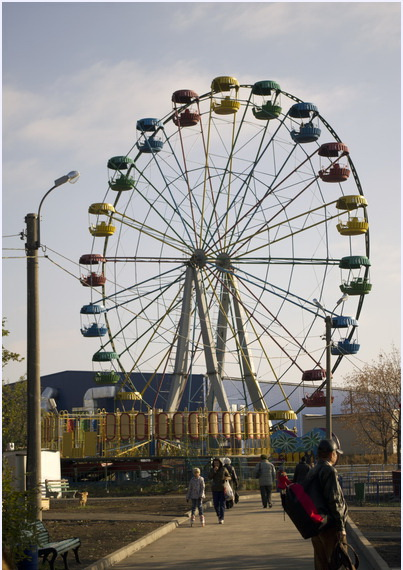
Ferris wheel in Victory Park

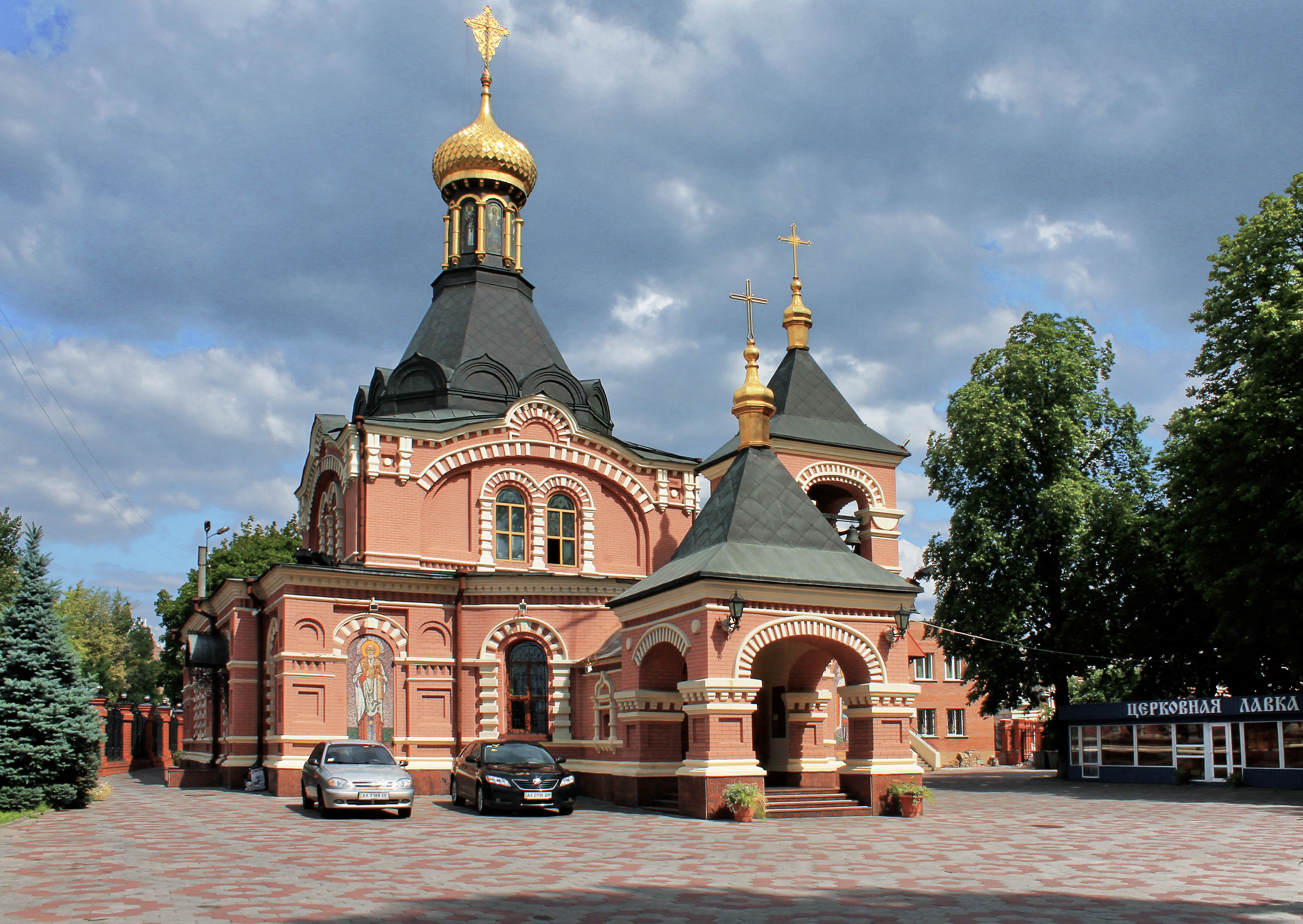
Temple of Alexander Nevsky

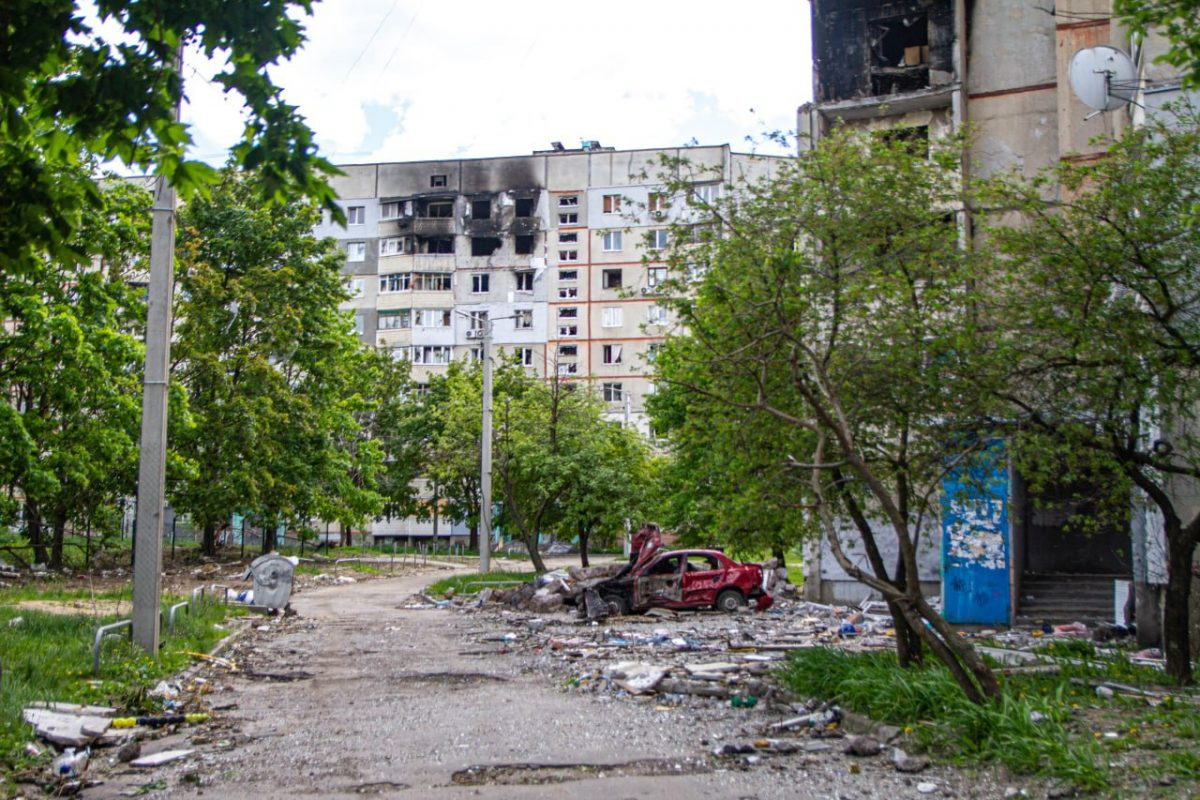
Northern Saltivka after the battle of Kharkiv (2022)

== See also ==
- Saltivka
