= Chalageri =

- village
- Location in Karnataka, India Chalageri (India)
- Coordinates: 14.56524°N 75.716570°E
- Country: India
- State: Karnataka
- District: Haveri
- Named for: Largest silk producing village in Ranibennur
- Talukas: Ranibennur

Population (2014)
  - Total: 12,054

Languages
  - Official: Kannada
- Time zone: UTC+5:30 (IST)

Chalageri is a village in the southern state of Karnataka, India. It is located in the Ranibennur taluk of Haveri district.

== Demographics ==
As of 2001 India census, Chalageri had a population of 6672.

== See also ==
- Haveri
- Districts of Karnataka
