= Hennadiy Kernes =

Ukrainian politician (1959–2020)

- Геннадій Кернес (Ukrainian); Геннадий Кернес (Russian)
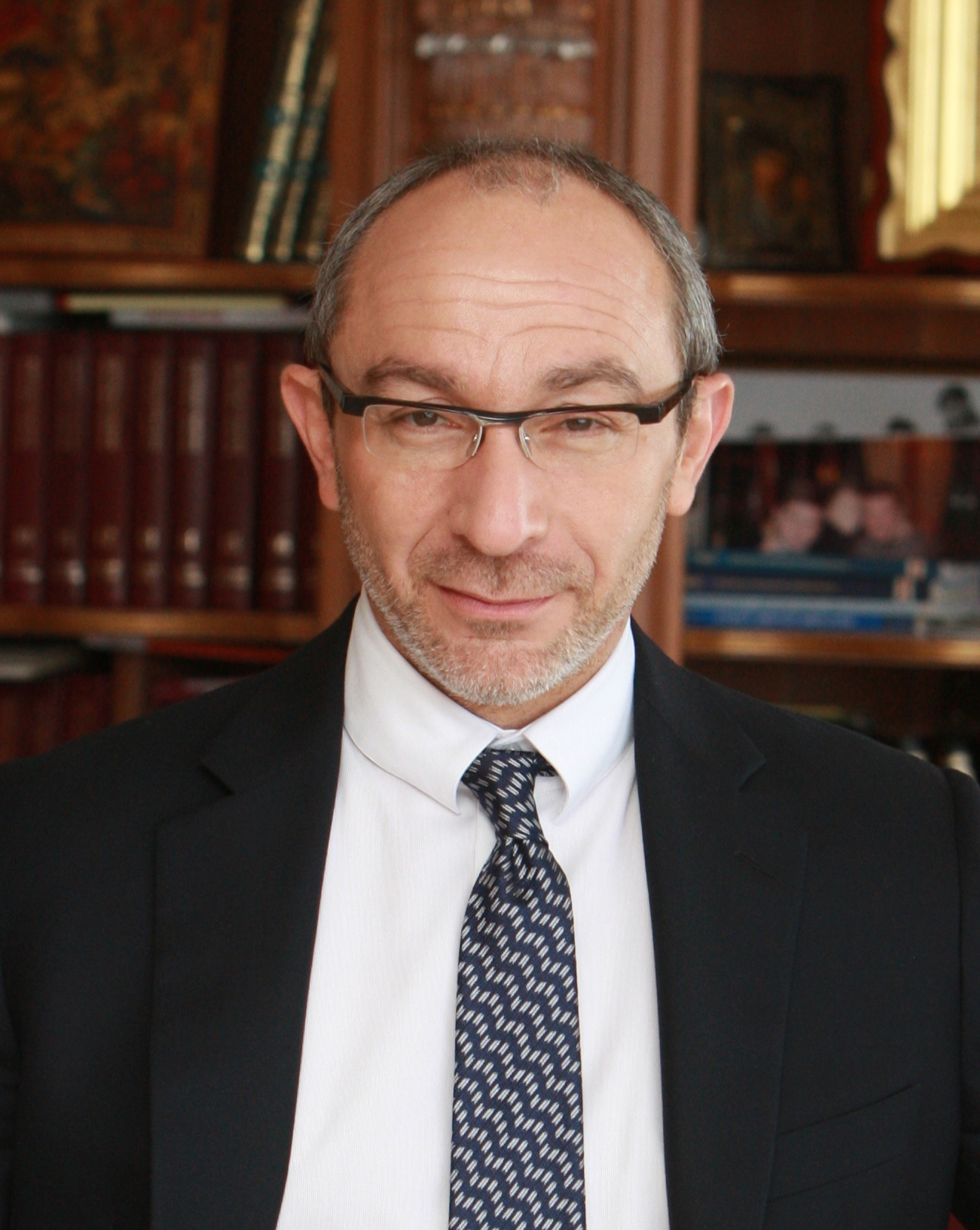
- Kernes in 2010

5th Mayor of Kharkiv
- In office 24 November 2010 – 16 December 2020
- Preceded by: Mykhailo Dobkin
- Succeeded by: Ihor Terekhov

Personal details
- Born: 27 June 1959 Kharkov, Ukrainian SSR, Soviet Union
- Died: 16 December 2020 (aged 61) Berlin, Germany
- Cause of death: Kidney failure, COVID-19
- Party: Kernes Bloc — Successful Kharkiv
- Other political affiliations: Party of Regions (before 2014); Revival (2015–2019); Opposition Bloc (2019–2020)
- Spouses: Oksana Vasilenko (div. 1985); Oksana Haisynska
- Children: Kyrylo Kernes; Danylo Pryvalov; Rodion Haisynskyi
- Education: Yaroslav Mudryi National Law University (LLM); Kharkiv National University of Economics (Candidate of Sciences)
- Profession: Locksmith; lawyer
- Website: kernes.com.ua (personal) city.kharkiv.ua (official)

Hennadiy Adolfovych Kernes (Note: Ukrainian: Геннадій Адольфович Кернес Russian: Геннадий Адольфович Кернес, romanized: Gennadiy Adolfovich Kernes) (27 June 1959 – 16 December 2020) was a Ukrainian politician who was the 5th mayor of Kharkiv from 24 November 2010 until his death on 16 December 2020. Previously, Kernes served as secretary of the Kharkiv City Council (2002, 2006 – 2010).

== Early life ==
Kernes was born into a Jewish family, to Adolf Lazarevych Kernes and Anna Abramovna in Kharkiv. He graduated from the National University "Yaroslav the Wise Law Academy of Ukraine" with a degree in law and from Kharkiv National University of Economics with a degree in public administration. Kernes started his career in 1977 at the Kharkiv plant "Miner's Light". Between 1977 and 1979 Kernes studied in CTC-14 in Kharkiv and specialised in draftsman-designer on mechanics.

== Business career ==
From 1979 to 1990, Kernes worked for a number of enterprises. According to his official biography, his career began in 1977. Kernes managed the production and trading company Acceptor from 1992 to 1994. He then became the chairman at CJSC NPK-Holding until 1999. Kernes was then first deputy director of the Kharkiv branch of the Trading House Gas of Ukraine until 2001. He then became CEO at NPK-Holding until 2006.

Kernes had a criminal record for theft and fraud; according to him, the accusations were "partly fabricated" by "his enemies".

== Political career ==
In 1998, Kernes was first elected into the Kharkiv City Council, and served three terms there. Between April and May 2002, Kernes was the secretary of Kharkiv City Council. In the City Council, he founded and led the nonpartisan deputy group "New Kharkiv - New Opportunities".

In November 2004, he supported the Orange Revolution. He came out to condemn the actions taken by the regional governor Yevhen Kushnaryov. In 2006, he was elected to the Kharkiv City Council on the list of the Party of Regions, as a member of the party. In April 2006 Kernes became the secretary of Kharkiv City Council.

=== Election video scandal ===
On September 27, 2007, a video recording how Dobkin’s election speech was prepared in December 2005 was posted on YouTube. A video containing profanity by Hennadiy Kernes was also shown on television. The authenticity of this recording is controversial. Dobkin himself called this video "partially edited". On the first day, the video on YouTube was viewed by about 120 thousand people, and in total, as of June 2020, there were more than 6.1 million views. The video spawned a huge number of Internet memes in the Russian-speaking segment of the Internet.

=== Mayor of Kharkiv ===
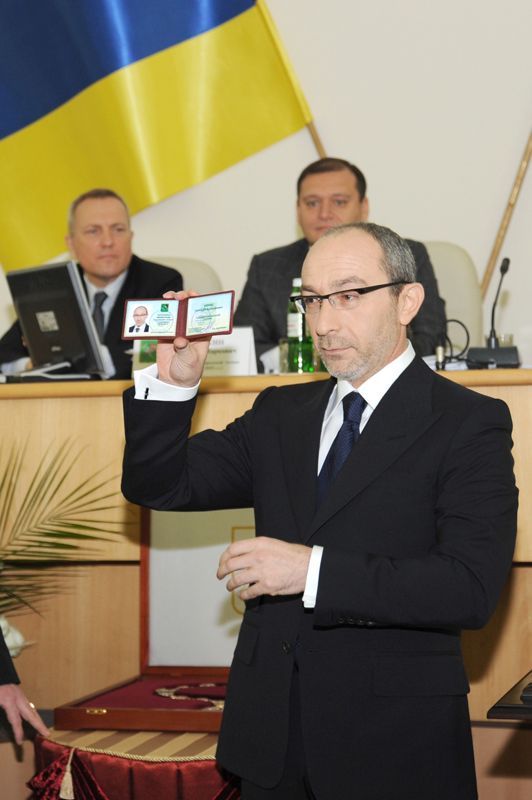
Hennadiy Kernes took the oath of the Kharkiv mayor, 2010.

Prior to Mykhailo Dobkin's 2010 appointment to the post of the head of the Kharkiv regional state administration, Kernes had been the secretary of city council, the acting mayor of Kharkiv (March 2010 – 24 November 2010). In 2010, he had his candidacy nominated for the Party of Regions in the 2010 Ukrainian local elections as mayor of Kharkiv. In October, Kernes was elected as the mayor of Kharkiv by a small, controversial margin. On 24 November 2010, he took the oath and entered the post in early December 2010.

In January 2014, Kernes awarded himself a 25% pay raise.

Kernes was noted for holding a strongly 'pro-Russian' stance and for being a supporter of then-President of Ukraine Viktor Yanukovych. During the anti-Yanukovych Euromaidan protests in late 2013 and early 2014, he was accused of organizing anti-Maidan demonstrations, as well as hiring titushky (thugs that allegedly provoked and attacked Euromaidan supporters).

Following the Revolution of Dignity, after he and the governor of Kharkiv Oblast, Mykhailo Dobkin, had briefly found refuge in Russia, Kernes was accused of alleged connections to death threats, kidnapping and torturing of participants of Euromaidan in Kharkiv and was subsequently placed under night-time house arrest. This criminal case against him was dropped on 30 July 2014 "due to the serious illness of the suspect". He was accused, in February 2014, by the post-revolutionary leadership of promoting separatism. However, since then he was believed to have softened this position, pivoting to support an undivided Ukraine in line with Kyiv. In March 2014 he stated that he had been a "prisoner of Yanukovych's system" and that he expected "good things to come" from the new Yatsenyuk Government.

=== Attempted assassination and re-election ===
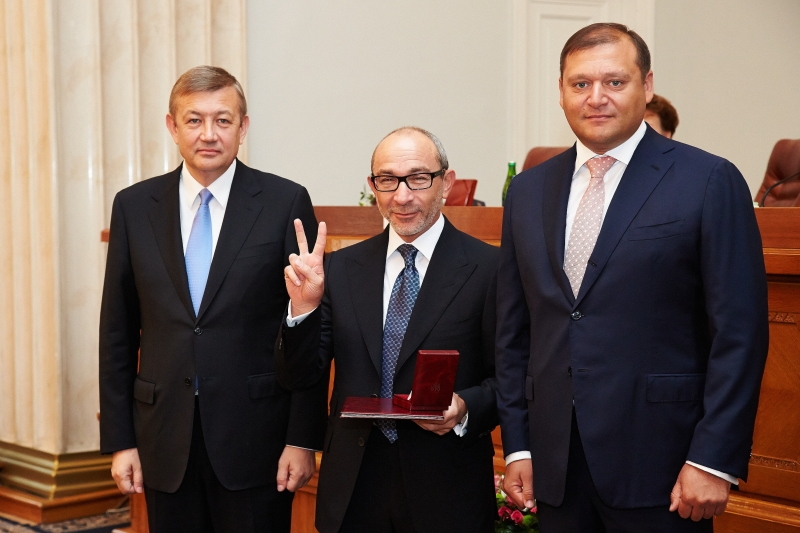
Left to right: Serhiy Chernov, Hennadiy Kernes, Mykhailo Dobkin

On 28 April 2014, Kernes was shot once in the back while hiking by an unknown assailant using a sniper rifle.

Although the wound was life-threatening, doctors performed emergency surgery and were able to stabilize him. The following day Kernes was flown to Israel for further treatment. According to a report by Televiziyna Sluzhba Novyn on 10 May 2014, he was "making a quick recovery"; in the accompanying interview he stated, "I'm in favor of Kharkiv remaining part of Ukraine, and therefore in favor of seeing her flourish". While recovering in Israel, Kernes stated on 11 June 2014 his willingness to cooperate with newly inaugurated Ukrainian President Petro Poroshenko. On 12 August 2014, he stated "Please remember these people -Kharkiv was, is, and will be part of a single and indivisible Ukraine". Kernes commented on the 2014 Russian annexation of Crimea on 23 August 2014, saying "Crimea will return to Ukraine, I believe in it". Kernes returned to Kharkiv on 17 June 2014. Following the incident, he used a wheelchair.

In the October 2015 Kharkiv mayoral election, Kernes was re-elected as a candidate of Revival in the first round of the election with 65.8% of the votes, with a voter turnout of 44.4%. He took office on November 18, 2015. After his re-election, Kernes took a position loyal to the new Kyiv government: he made loud statements, but did not take any measures to protect Soviet monuments.

In December 2018, Kernes said that in the 2019 Ukrainian presidential elections he would vote for Petro Poroshenko, as he had made "quite a lot of effort" to finance and develop Kharkiv.

On June 2, 2019, the founding congress of the new party Trust in Deeds took place in Kharkiv, the two co-chairs of which were chosen as the city heads of Kharkiv and Odesa, Hennadiy Kernes and Gennadiy Trukhanov.

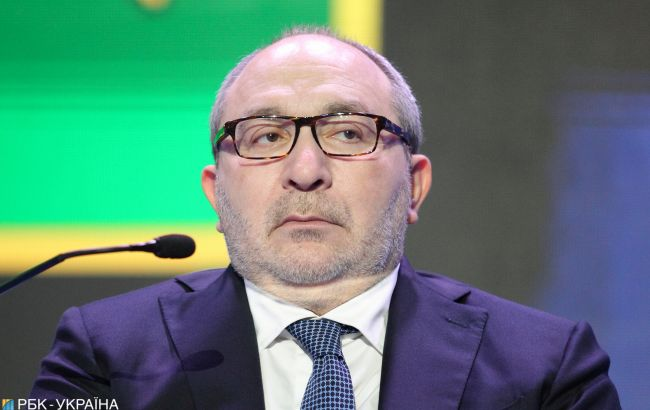
Kernes at the Congress of the Opposition Bloc, June 2019

In the July 2019 Ukrainian parliamentary election, Kernes was placed in the top ten of the party list of Opposition Bloc. However, the nationwide list of this party won just 3.23% of the votes, failing to overcome the 5% election barrier and keeping Kernes from a seat in the Verkhovna Rada.

In June 2020, Kernes announced that he had been nominated for re-election as Kharkiv mayor under the banner of his new political party, Kernes Bloc — Successful Kharkiv in the October 2020 Kharkiv mayoral election.

== Death ==
Kernes last public appearance was on Kharkiv City Day on 23 August 2020. On 15 September, the Kharkiv City Council officially denied reports that he had gone into a coma after becoming infected with COVID-19 during the COVID-19 pandemic in Ukraine. It was confirmed that he was on sick leave.

On 17 September 2020, Kernes was hospitalized in Germany in university hospital Charité, to be treated for his COVID-19 infection. He did not appear in public afterwards.

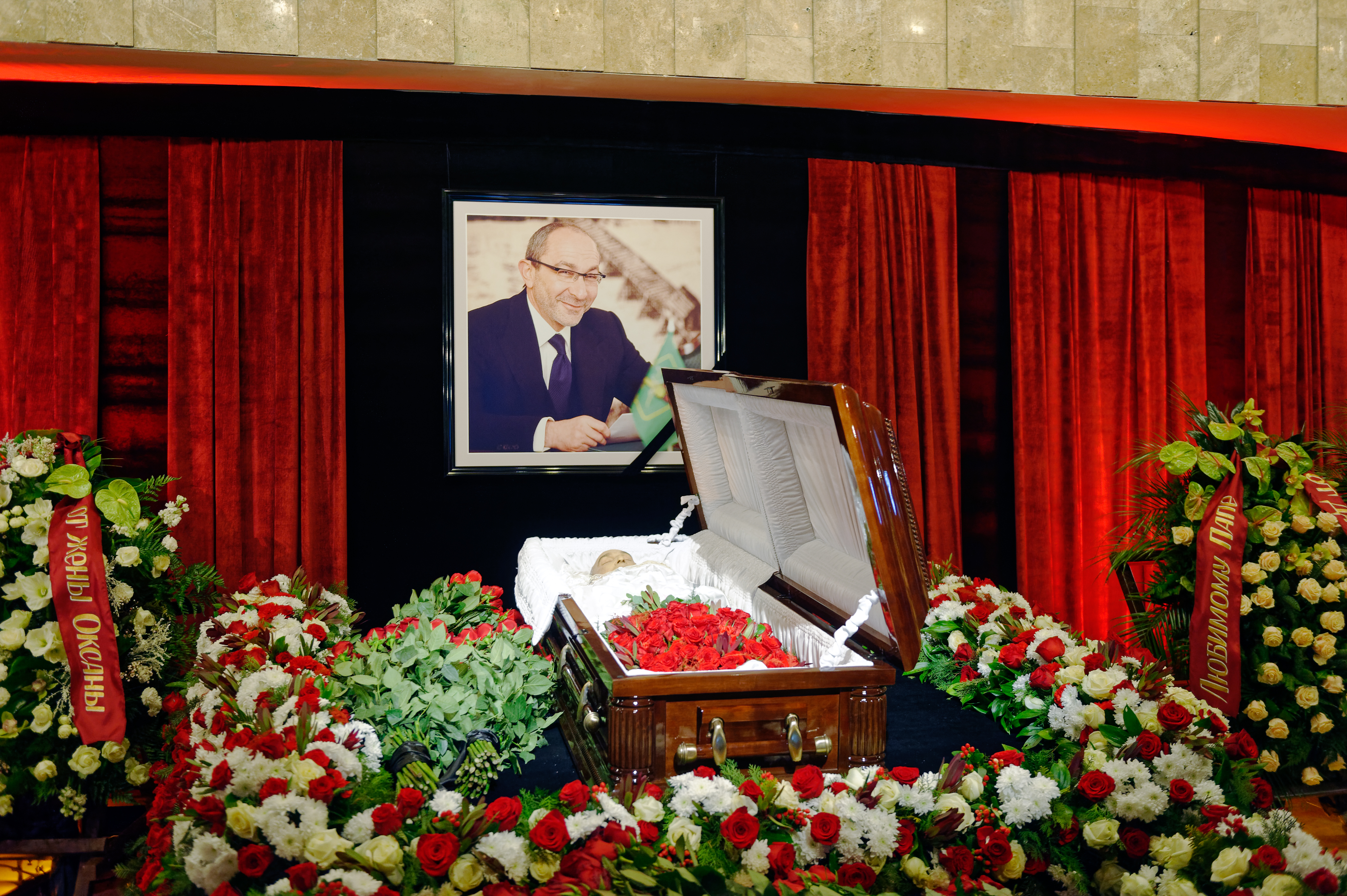
Kernes funeral held in the Kharkiv National Academic Opera and Ballet Theatre

Kernes won the 25 October 2020 Kharkiv mayoral election with 60.34% of the votes. At the time of his election, his party stated that Kernes would shortly return to Kharkiv to fulfil his duties as Mayor. On 9 December 2020, Kernes was sworn in as Kharkiv Mayor without being present at the first session of the new Kharkiv City Council. Two days later, it was confirmed that Kernes had experienced kidney failure. Despite this, the public relations department of the Kharkiv City Council stated that he would "be able to perform his duties."

On 17 December 2020, the Kharkiv City Council and Kernes' friend Pavel Fuks confirmed that Kernes had died in Berlin of complications from COVID-19. On this day, it was also announced that, due to Kernes' death, a three-day mourning would be held in Kharkiv, with all entertainment and concert events and sports competitions being cancelled, but this was scaled back to one day on 18 December 2020.

Kernes was buried on 23 December 2020 at Kharkiv's 2nd city cemetery, where famous Kharkiv residents are traditionally buried. His funeral ceremony was held at Kharkiv's Annunciation Cathedral in a service that was led by the primate of the Ukrainian Orthodox Church of the Moscow Patriarchate, Metropolitan Onufriy.

On 22 August 2021, a memorial plaque was unveiled on the Kharkiv City Council building, where Hennadiy Kernes had served.

== Personal life ==
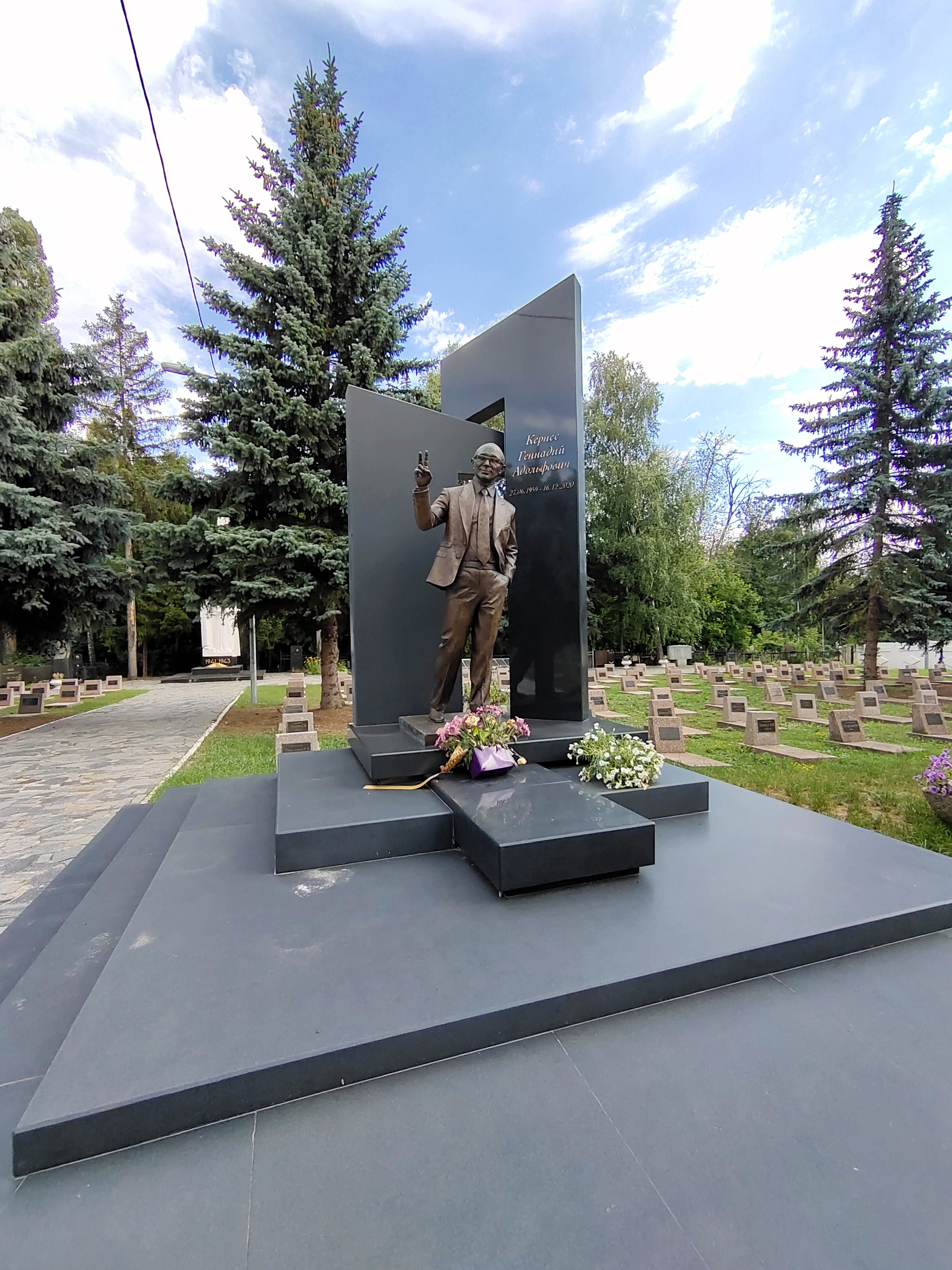
The grave of Hennadiy Kernes

Kernes' first wife was Oksana Vasilenko; the couple divorced in 1985. His second wife was Oksana (née Haysinskaya). Kernes was a father of three children, including his stepson, Haysinskaya's son from her previous marriage. In January 2003 Haysinskaya appealed to the police department alleging that Kernes had injured her. Subsequently, Kharkiv billboards appeared with the message "Oksana, I'm sorry!".

Kernes owned 27 dogs, assorted birds, and other animals and since 2007 had lived in a Kharkiv hotel. His Instagram account was described by The New York Times as "eccentric"; Kernes claimed "Of all the mayors, my Instagram account is the best". He was known for actively promoting healthier living.

Since they met in 1998, Kernes was a close friend of Mykhailo Dobkin – governor of Kharkiv Oblast from 2010 to 2014, mayor of Kharkiv from 2006 to 2010, past member of the Verkhovna Rada (Ukraine's parliament) and the Party of Regions candidate in the 2014 Ukrainian presidential election. A video (containing swearing) leaked in 2007 of Kernes instructing Dobkin is famous in Ukraine and has created a few national catchphrases.

In line with new anti-corruption rules, which compel all senior public officials to declare their wealth in an electronic database, Kernes declared in October 2016 that he owned more than $1.6m in hard currency.

== Awards ==
- The Order of Merit third class (5 July 2012) – For the significant personal contribution to the preparation and conduct of the 2012 UEFA European Football Championship final in Ukraine, successful implementation of infrastructural projects, law and order and public safety guarantee during the tournament, improvement of international Ukraine authority, high professionalism
- The Kharkiv regional state administration certificate
- The Badge of Honor 'Slobozhyanskaya Slava', "For diligence to 350 years of Kharkiv foundation"
- The Medal '60th anniversary of the Battle of Kursk'
- The Medal 'For active participation in the veteran's movement'
- The XVII annual award 'Person of the Year 2012' in the category of 'City Head of the Year'

== See also ==
- List of mayors of Kharkiv
