= Svitlychna Bloc — Together! =

Svitlychna Bloc — Together! Блок Світличної «Разом!»
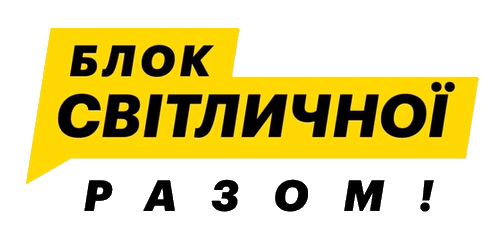
- Leader: Yuliya Svitlychna
- Founded: August 6, 2015
- Merger of: European Solidarity
- Headquarters: Kharkiv
- Ideology: Liberalism; Decentralisation; Anti-corruption; Pro-Europeanism
- Political position: Centre-right
- Colours: Yellow
- Verkhovna Rada: 1 / 450
- Kharkiv Oblast Council: 17 / 120
- Kharkiv City Council: 6 / 85

Website
- Facebook

Svitlychna Bloc — Together! (Ukrainian: Блок Світличної «Разом!», romanized: Blok Svitlychnoi «Razom!») is a Ukrainian political party established in August 2015. Party leader — Yulia Svitlychna.

== History ==
On August 6, 2015, the "United Power" party was established in Kyiv. In the same year, its leader Volodymyr Netrebenko ran for the party in the Kyiv City Council election, but did not pass the electoral threshold to become elected.

On April 23, 2020, the party changed its name to "Svitlychna Bloc — Together!".

The party leader is ex-head of the Kharkiv Regional State Administration, People's Deputy of Ukraine of the 9th convocation Yulia Svitlychna. Yulia Svitlychna describes her new party as an association of regional leaders of public opinion.

=== 2020 local elections ===
According to the results of the 2020 Kharkiv local elections, the party won 17 out of 120 seats in the Kharkiv Oblast Council and 6 out of 84 seats in the Kharkiv City Council. In addition, the party also won seats in other city councils in Kharkiv Oblast, which includes: 12 out of 36 seats in Lozova, 3 out of 34 seats in Izyum, 3 out of 34 in Chuhuiv, 5 out of 34 in Kupiansk, 7 out of 34 in Bohodukhiv, and 3 out of 26 in Krasnohrad.
