= Mayor of Kharkiv =

- Coat of arms of Kharkiv

- Flag of the City of Kharkiv

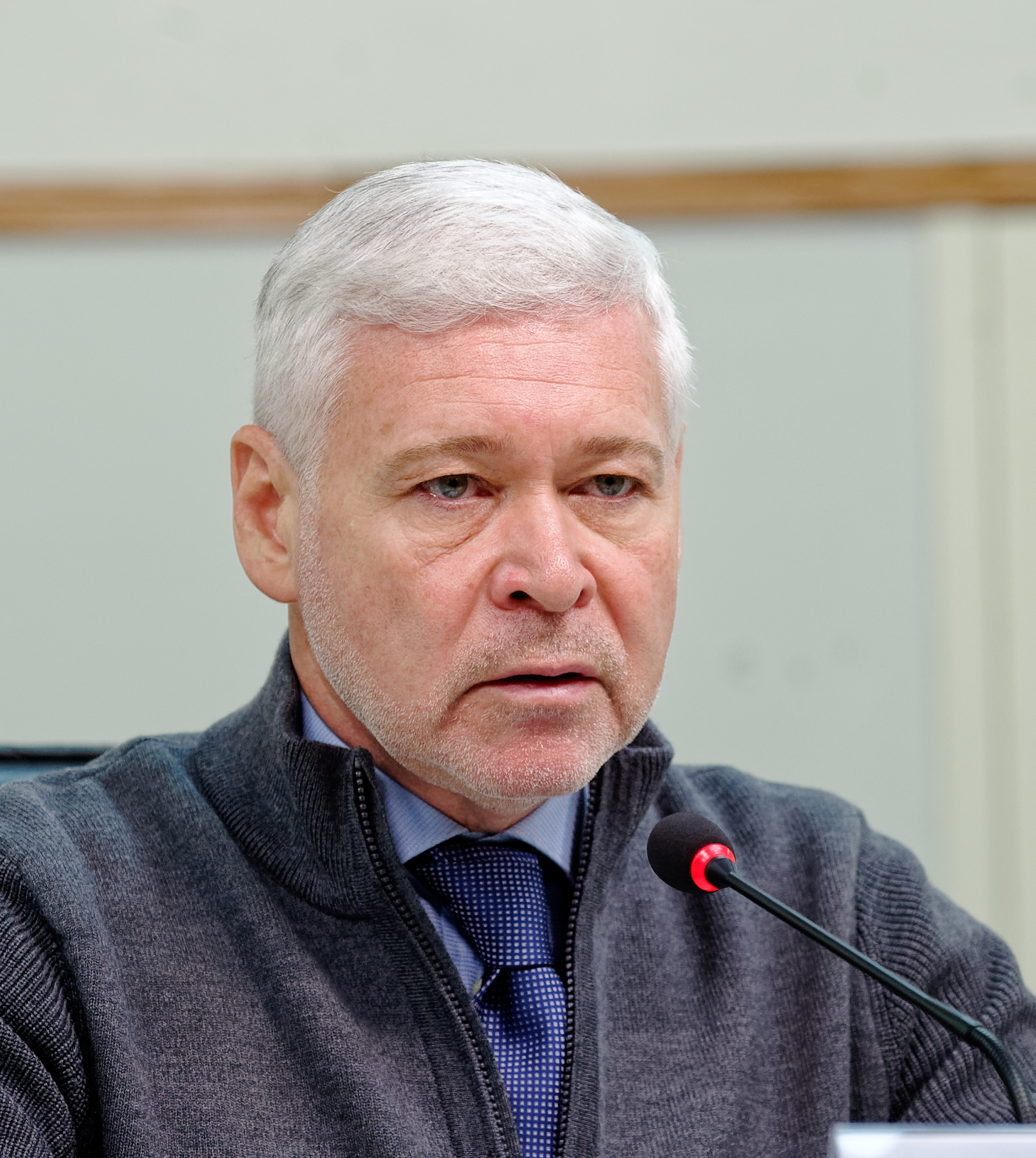
- Incumbent; Ihor Terekhov since 17 December 2020
- Seat: Kharkiv City Council
- Appointer: Popular vote
- Term length: 5 years
- Inaugural holder: Yevhen Kushnaryov
- Formation: 15 May 1990 (current); 1767 (historically)
- Website: Website of the Kharkiv Mayor

The following is a list of mayors of the city of Kharkiv, Ukraine. It includes positions equivalent to mayor, such as chairperson of the Kharkiv City Council's executive committee.

== Mayors ==
=== In the Russian Empire (before 1917) ===
| No. | Image | Name | In office | Notes |
|---|---|---|---|---|
| 1 | | Pavlo Hukovsky | 1767 — 1768 | First head of Kharkiv city government. Descendant of Cossack starshyna from Sloboda Ukraine. His leadership was mostly nominal. |
| 2 | | Fedor Afanasyev | 1768 — 1778 | Elected interim mayor in 1768, re-elected in 1771 as full-time head of city government. |
| 3 | | Petro Artyukhov | 1778 — 1784 | Previously worked in administration of Sloboda Cossack regiments. Burgomaster and member of governorate magistrate. |
| 4 | | Artemiy Karpov | 1784 — 1789 | Originally a merchant from Yelisavetgrad. Served two three-year terms. In 1787 greeted Catherine II of Russia during her visit to the city. |
| 5 | | Alexander Pavlov | 1790 — 1791 | Member of the nobility, had the rank of college registrator. |
| 6 | | Alexei Tambovtsev | 1791 — 1793 | Merchant, served as burgomaster and starost, but resigned from the latter post after a month. |
| 7 | | Andrey Anikeev | 1793 — 1796 | 2nd guild merchant. Initiated a ban on trade in the city for raznochintsy. |
| 8 | | Mykhailo Butenko (Butenkov) | 1796 — 1799 | Merchant. Served as city counsellor and starost. After resignation operated an inn. |
| 9 | | Yegor Uryupin | 1799 — 1805 | Merchant, originally from Kremenchuk. Opposed illegal orders by the governor, as a result of which in 1803 the latter attempted to remove him from the post, imprisoning him in a mental asylum. A friend of Hryhoriy Skovoroda, he supported the foundation of Kharkiv University and was awarded a noble rank for his service. |
| 10 | | Andrey Anikeev | 1805 — 1808 | 2nd term |
| 11 | | Fedot Karpov | 1808 — 1811 | Member of the Old Believer community, owner of a factory, several shops and land plots in the modern Moskalivka neighbourhood. |
| 12 | | Vasyl Lamakin | 1811 — 1823 | Rich merchant and philanthropist, organized gathering of funds for the Imperial Russian Army. |
| 13 | | Grigory Krivorotov | 1823 — 1828 | Belonged to the merchant class. |
| 14 | | Anton Motuzkov | 1829 — 1834 | Introduced measures against the 1830-1831 cholera epidemic, contributing money for the foundation of a hospital. |
| 15 | | Dmitry Kovalev | 1834 — 1837 | Merchant and member of the city duma, became mayor after the voluntary resignation of his predecessor. |
| 16 | | Serhiy Karpov | 1838 | Rich merchant and son of one of his predecessors, resigned soon after election. |
| 17 | | Fedor Bazylevsky | 1838 — 1839 | Merchant, resigned one year after appointment due to health and family issues. |
| 18 | | Andrey Klimov | 1839 — 1840 | Merchant, appointed following the resignation of his predecessor. For most of his tenure represented by elder burgomaster. |
| 19 | | Mikhail Kotlyarov | 1841 | Merchant. For his role in famine relief awarded with the title of honorary citizen by Nicholas I of Russia. |
| 20 | | Havrylo Hrinchenko (Grinchenkov) | 1841 — 1843 | Merchant and businessman. Under his tenure poor state of the city economy brought the attention of government administration, which started a special investigation. |
| 21 | | Fedor Rudakov | 1844 — 1846 | Merchant. |
| 22 | | Mikhail Kotlyarov | 1846 — 1847 | 2nd term |
| 23 | | Ivan Ryzhov | 1847 — 1849 | Merchant and factory owner. Received a medal of the Most Holy Synod for his support of the Assumption Cathedral. |
| 24 | | Alexei Rudakov | 1850 — 1852 | A wealthy merchant and successful administrator, he was removed from post and exiled to Ufa following a conflict with the governor-general. |
| 25 | | Serhiy Kostyurin | 1852 — 1858 | A wine merchant, he was popular among the governorate administration and received numerous awards. Became the prototype of a hero from several plays by Alexander Ostrovsky. |
| 26 | | Alexander Severin | 1859 — 1861 | Metal and mercery trader, active member of local government. Awarded with three medals. |
| 27 | | Oleksiy Skrynnyk | 1862 — 1867 | 1st guild merchant and hereditary honorary citizen, initiated the establishment of Ukraine's first municipal merchant bank. |
| 28 | | Mykola Shatunov | 1867 — 1870 | A merchant, he was elected to the post at the age of 32, becoming one of the youngest mayors in city's history. During his tenure the city's largest hospital during the pre-1917 era was established. |
| 29 | | Yegor Gordeienko | 1871 — 1873 | Kharkiv University professor and doctor of medicine, a native of Okhtyrka. Previously served as the first head of Kharkiv povit zemstvo administration. A supporter of democratic principles, he was elected mayor former the 1870 local government reform, but resigned two years later due to poor health. |
| 30 | | Alexei Chepelkin | 1874 — 1875 | Honorary citizen and head of the congress of judges. Held the position of mayor until the end of his predecessor's term. |
| 31 | | Alexander Kovalev | 1875 — 1884 | Descendant of a noble family, gained respect for his work as a judge. Re-elected three times, died on the post. Awarded two Orders of St. Stanislaus, Order of Saint Anna and a medal in memory of the Crimean War. |
| 32 | | Ivan Fesenko | 1884 — 1891 | Hereditary noble, elected following the death of his predecessor. During his tenure, the city's territory was expanded, and the first metal bridge was elected over the Lopan river. An asylum for the poor, a municipal pawn shop and several other important objects were established or expanded. |
| 33 | | Vladimir Shchelkov | 1892 — 1893 | Descandant of a merchant family, founder of one of the city's first notary offices. During his tenure the city suffered from a major flood and a typhus epidemic. Resigned after the authorities prematurely disbanded the city duma following a local government reform. |
| 34 | | Ivan Golenishchev-Kutuzov | 1893 — 1900 | A banker and companion of Aleksey Alchevsky, during his tenure a power plant, a slaughterhouse and a steam train factory were founded in the city, and the first municipal bonds were issued. In 1896 the mayor attended the coronation of Nicholas II and Alexandra Feodorovna in Moscow. In 1900 he resigned following a conflict with members of the city duma. |
| 35 | | Oleksandr Kostiantynovych Pohorilko | 1900 — 1912 | A scientist and civic activist, he promoted local government autonomy and democratization of politics, and contributed to the installation of electric lighting in the city. |
| 36 | | Roman Budberg | 1913 | A nobleman and candidate of progressist forces, he resigned after one month, protesting against disrepect from the Ministry of Internal Affairs. |
| 37 | | Mykola Dorofeev | 1913 — 1914 | A university professor, he belonged to the liberal-progressive wing of the city duma and served as a temporary head of the city government, remaining deputy mayor until the February Revolution. |
| 38 | | Ivan Bych-Lubensky | 1914 | A nobleman, he belonged to the reactionary wing of the city duma. A candidate from the conservative-monarchist party, he was elected mayor on 18 September 1914, but refused to take the post before being confirmed by the government. |
| 39 | | Dmytro Bahalii | 1914 — 1917 | Notable scientist and civic activist of Ukrainophile orientation, he belonged to the Constitutional Democratic Party. His tenure coincided with the First World War, which resulted in an economic crisis, scarcity of food and epidemics. Following the Revolution of 1917 resigned in favour of Socialist-Revolutionary Party leader Vladimir Karelin, who headed the city duma. |

=== Ukrainian People's Republic of Soviets and Ukrainian Soviet Republic (1917-1918) ===
| No. | Portrait | Name | Took office | Left office | Political party | Notes |
|---|---|---|---|---|---|---|
| 1 | | Mykhailo Lazko | March 1917 | March 1917 | Communist Party | Head of the Kharkiv Council of Workers' Deputies. After unification with the Council of Soldiers' Deputies in March 1917, served as deputy head of the new organ. |
| 2 | | Ivan Svetlov | March 1917 | August 1917 | Communist Party | Served as head of the united Kharkiv Council; resigned in August 1917. |
| 3 | | Pavlo Kin | August 1917 | November 1917 | Communist Party | Head of the executive committee and Kharkiv revkom. |
| 4 | | Fyodor Sergeyev (Artyom) | November 1917 | November 1917 | Communist Party | Head of the presidium of the executive committee of Kharkiv Council of Workers' and Soldiers' Deputies. |
| 5 | | Serhiy Buzdalin | 1917 | 1918 | Communist Party | Member of Kharkiv city duma from the Bolshevik party. Headed the executive committee of Kharkiv Council. |
| 6 | | Kostiantyn Huly | 1918 | 1918 | Communist Party | Head of Kharkiv Council, one of the leaders of the all-Ukrainian strike of railway workers during the German-Austrian occupation. |

=== As part of the Ukrainian People's Republic and Ukrainian State (1917-1918) ===
| No. | Portrait | Name | Took office | Left office | Political party | Notes |
|---|---|---|---|---|---|---|
| 1 | | Serhiy Stefanovych | 1917 | 1918 | Socialist Revolutionary Party | Won the first democratic mayoral election. Deposed by the Bolshevik municipal council, reinstated following the expulsion of Soviet officials. |
| 2 | | Volodymyr Aga-Bekov | 19 December 1918 | 1919 | Socialist Revolutionary Party | Member of the right-wing of Socialist Revolutionary Party. |

=== Ukrainian Soviet Socialist Republic (1919) ===
| No. | Portrait | Name | Took office | Left office | Political party | Notes |
|---|---|---|---|---|---|---|
| 7 | | Semen Tyshkov | January 1919 | February 1919 | Communist Party | Participated in underground activities against Pavlo Skoropadsky's regime. Elected head of presidium of Kharkiv Council following the return of Red Army troops to the city. |
| 8 | | Pavlo Kin | February 1919 | April 1919 | Communist Party | Commandant of the city in 1918 and 1919. In February 1919 elected head of Kharkiv Governorate executive. |

=== Under control of the Armed Forces of South Russia (1919) ===
| No. | Portrait | Name | Took office | Left office | Political party |
|---|---|---|---|---|---|
| 1 | | Nikolai Nikolaevich Saltykov | October 1919 | December 1919 | Constitutional Democratic Party |

=== Ukrainian Soviet Socialist Republic (1919-1941) ===
| No. | Portrait | Name | Took office | Left office | Political party | Notes |
|---|---|---|---|---|---|---|
| 9 | | Alexei Nikolaevich Ivanov | January 1920 | April 1920 | Communist Party | Member of the state duma from the Bolshevik party. Head of Kharkiv city council and Kharkiv Governorate executive committee. |
| 10 | | Boris Volin | June 1920 | October 1920 | Communist Party | Simultaneously headed the Kharkiv Governorate Council of Workers' and Soldiers' Deputies. |
| 11 | | Andriy Ivanov | November 1920 | December 1920 | Communist Party | One of the leaders of Kiev Arsenal January Uprising. Served as head of the city council and governorate executive committee. Resigned due to health reasons. |
| 12 | | Vasiliy Averin | January 1921 | July 1921 | Communist Party | Served as head of Kharkiv Governorate executive committee. |
| 13 | | Stepan Kuznetsov | July 1921 | 1921 | Communist Party | Head of Kharkiv Governorate Executive Committee and Kharkiv City Council. Led post-war reconstruction works and transition to planned economy. |
| 14 | | Kostiantyn Huly | 1921 | 1922 | Communist Party | Head of Kharkiv Council of Workers', Soldiers' and Red Army deputies. |
| 15 | | Stepan Kuznetsov | 1922 | 1923 | Communist Party | |
| 16 | | Konstantin Fedotov | 1923 | 1925 | Communist Party | Head of the Kharkiv Governorate Executive Committee and Kharkiv City Council. |
| 17 | | Oleksiy Chernukha | June 1925 | October 1925 | Communist Party | Secretary of the city council, served as interim head of municipal government. |
| 18 | | Ivan Gavrilin | 1926 | 1927 | Communist Party | Previously served as head of Kharkiv Okruha Executive Committee. |
| 19 | | Serhiy Buzdalin | 1927 | 1928 | Communist Party | Head of Kharkiv Okruha Executive Committee. |
| 20 | | Ivan Kozhukhov | 1927 | 1929 | Communist Party | Red Army commissar. Head of Kharkiv City Council. |
| 21 | | Hryhoriy Borodai | 1929 | 1930 | Communist Party | Red Guard veteran, elected head of the city council following a recommendation by the okruha committee of the Communist Party of Ukraine. |
| 22 | | Alexander Sidorov | 1930 | 1932 | Communist Party | Head of Kharkiv City Council. Later served as deputy people's commissar of supplies of Ukrainian SSR. |
| 23 | | Fedor Kuzoyatov | 1932 | 1933 | Communist Party | Transferred to Kharkiv in 1931. Elected head of the city council on 18 September 1932. |
| 24 | | Illya Shelekhes | 1933 | 1934 | Communist Party | Transferred to Ukraine in 1933. Headed the city council and government of Kharkiv region during the Holodomor. |
| 25 | | Samuil Saratikov | 1934 | 1935 | Communist Party | In 1933-1934 served as head of Sumy city council. In 1934 headed the city council in Kharkiv, but in October 1935 was dismissed. |
| 26 | | Volodymyr Bohutsky | 1935 | 1937 | Communist Party | Head of the city council. In January 1937 arrested on accusation of "anti-Soviet activities" and removed from the party as "enemy of the people". |
| 27 | | Andriy Gress | January 1937 | February 1937 | Communist Party | Deputy head of the city council, fulfilled the duties following his predecessor's arrest. |
| 28 | | Marko Tkachenko | February 1937 | May 1937 | Communist Party | Interim head as deputy. |
| 29 | | Petro Klochko | May 1937 | September 1937 | Communist Party | Arrested and expelled from the party as "enemy of the people" soon after appointment. |
| 30 | | Marko Tkachenko | September 1937 | October 1937 | Communist Party | Interim head as deputy. |
| 31 | | Ivan Bobrov | 1937 | 1939 | Communist Party | Temprary head of Kharkiv City Council, later served as a member of the Supreme Soviet of the Ukrainian Soviet Socialist Republic. |
| 32 | | Oleksandr Hnatovych Selivanov | January 1940 | 24 October 1941 | Communist Party | Head of Kharkiv Executive Council. Commanded a corps of people's militia during the German-Soviet War. |

=== German occupation (1941-1943) ===
| No. | Portrait | Name | Took office | Left office | Political party |
|---|---|---|---|---|---|
Military commandant
| 1 | | Erwin Vierow | 24 October 1941 | 3 December 1941 | Nazi Party |
| 2 | | Alfred von Puttkamer | 3 December 1941 | 9 February 1942 | Nazi Party |
| 3 | | Colonels Landenbach and Loevenich | 9 February 1942 | 20 April 1942 | Nazi Party |
| 4 | | Wolfgang Schmidt-Logan | 20 April 1942 | October 1942 | Nazi Party |
Ober-Burgomaster
| 1 | | Oleksiy Kramarenko | October 1941 | August 1942 | Organisation of Ukrainian Nationalists |
| 2 | | Oleksandr Semenenko | 1942 | 15 March 1943 | Organisation of Ukrainian Nationalists |
| 3 | | Pavlo Kozakevych | 15 March 1943 | 30 April 1943 | Organisation of Ukrainian Nationalists |

=== Ukrainian Soviet Socialist Republic (1943-1991) ===
| No. | Portrait | Name | Took office | Left office | Political party | Notes |
|---|---|---|---|---|---|---|
| 33 | | Oleksandr Hnatovych Selivanov | 23 August 1943 | 11 February 1948 | Communist Party | Returned to head the city council in March 1943 and after the city's final liberation. Engaged in the restoration of local economy after the war. |
| 34 | | Petro Sachko | 1948 | 1950 | Communist Party | Previously served as first deputy of the head of Kharkiv City Council. Engaged in restoration of the ruined city. |
| 35 | | Anatoliy Koptev | 1950 | 1953 | Communist Party | Head of the city executive council. |
| 36 | | Oleksandr Bulhakov | March 1953 | November 1953 | Communist Party | Head of city executive council. |
| 37 | | Oleksiy Mykhailyk | 1953 | 1960 | Communist Party | Previously served as head of the city's communal engineering institute. Head of the executive committee of Kharkiv City Council. Authored popular works on the city's architecture. |
| 38 | | Kostiantyn Fedorenko | 1960 | 1961 | Communist Party | Head of Kharkiv executive council. Resigned due to health reasons. |
| 39 | | Heorhiy Vlasenko | 1961 | 1969 | Communist Party | Oversaw the construction of several new residential quarters. In 1965 project works on the construction of Kharkiv Metro started. |
| 40 | | Yuriy Hurovy | 1969 | 1976 | Communist Party | Inaugurated a transport connection to Saltivka, oversaw the construction of new residential quarters, hospitals and kindergartens. |
| 41 | | Yuriy Matyushenko | 1976 | 1980 | Communist Party | Continued residential and capital projects started by his predecessors. Unveiled the second stage of the first line of Kharkiv Metro, started the construction of Kharkiv TEC-5. |
| 42 | | Valentyn Vedernikov | 1980 | 1984 | Communist Party | His tenure saw rapid residential construction and launch of the second line of Kharkiv Metro. Lobbied the construction of Kharkiv Opera. |
| 43 | | Volodymyr Obrevko | 1984 | 1985 | Communist Party | Previously served as deputy head of the city executive committee. Actively developed international contacts, visiting international events in France and Italy. |
| 44 | | Anatoliy Reznichenko | October 1985 | 10 December 1985 | Communist Party | Graduated from Kharkiv Polytechnic Institute, engineer by profession. Died soon after election. |
| 45 | | Stepan Sokolovsky | 1986 | 6 April 1990 | Communist Party | Under his tenure the construction of the Kharkiv Opera finished, and cooperative movement developed. In 1987 he took part in an international meeting of city mayors in Milan. |
| 46 | | Yevhen Kushnaryov | 6 April 1990 | April 1998 | Communist Party | First democratically elected mayor of Kharkiv. Under his management the process of formation wof local democratic government started. Promoted the development of market economy. |

=== Independent Ukraine, since 1991 ===
| No. | Portrait | Name | Took office | Left office | Time in office | Political party | Elections |
|---|---|---|---|---|---|---|---|
| 1 | | Yevhen Kushnaryov (1951–2007) | 6 April 1990 | April 1998 | c. 7 years, 360 days | Independent | 1990 |
| | | Yevhen Kushnaryov (1951–2007) | 6 April 1990 | April 1998 | c. 7 years, 360 days | People's Democratic Party | 1994 |
| 2 | | Mykhaylo Pylypchuk (born 1945) | April 1998 | 21 March 2002 | c. 3 years, 354 days | Independent | 1998 |
| 3 | | Volodymyr Shumilkin (born 1959) | 21 March 2002 | 26 March 2006 | 4 years, 5 days | Independent | 2002 |
| 4 | | Mykhailo Dobkin (born 1970) | 26 March 2006 | 18 March 2010 | 3 years, 357 days | Party of Regions | 2006 |
| 5 | | Hennadiy Kernes (1959–2020) | 24 November 2010 | 17 December 2020 | 10 years, 23 days | Party of Regions | 2010 |
| 5 | | Hennadiy Kernes (1959–2020) | 24 November 2010 | 17 December 2020 | 10 years, 23 days | Revival | 2015 |
| 5 | | Hennadiy Kernes (1959–2020) | 24 November 2010 | 17 December 2020 | 10 years, 23 days | Kernes Bloc — Successful Kharkiv | 2020 |
| 6 | | Ihor Terekhov (born 1967) | 11 November 2021 | Incumbent | 4 years, 346 days | Kernes Bloc — Successful Kharkiv | 2021 |

== Latest election ==
Summary of the 31 October 2021 Kharkiv mayoral election results
| Candidate | Party | Votes | % |
|---|---|---|---|
| Ihor Terekhov | Kernes Bloc — Successful Kharkiv | 146,240 | 50,66 |
| Mykhailo Dobkin | Independent | 82,008 | 28,41 |
| Oleksandr Skoryk | European Solidarity | 15,462 | 5,36 |
| Konstantin Nemychev | Independent | 12,258 | 4,25 |
| Total | | 288,654 | 100,00 |

== See also ==
- Timeline of Kharkiv
