= Ihor Terekhov =

Mayor of Kharkiv, Ukraine

- Ігор Терехов
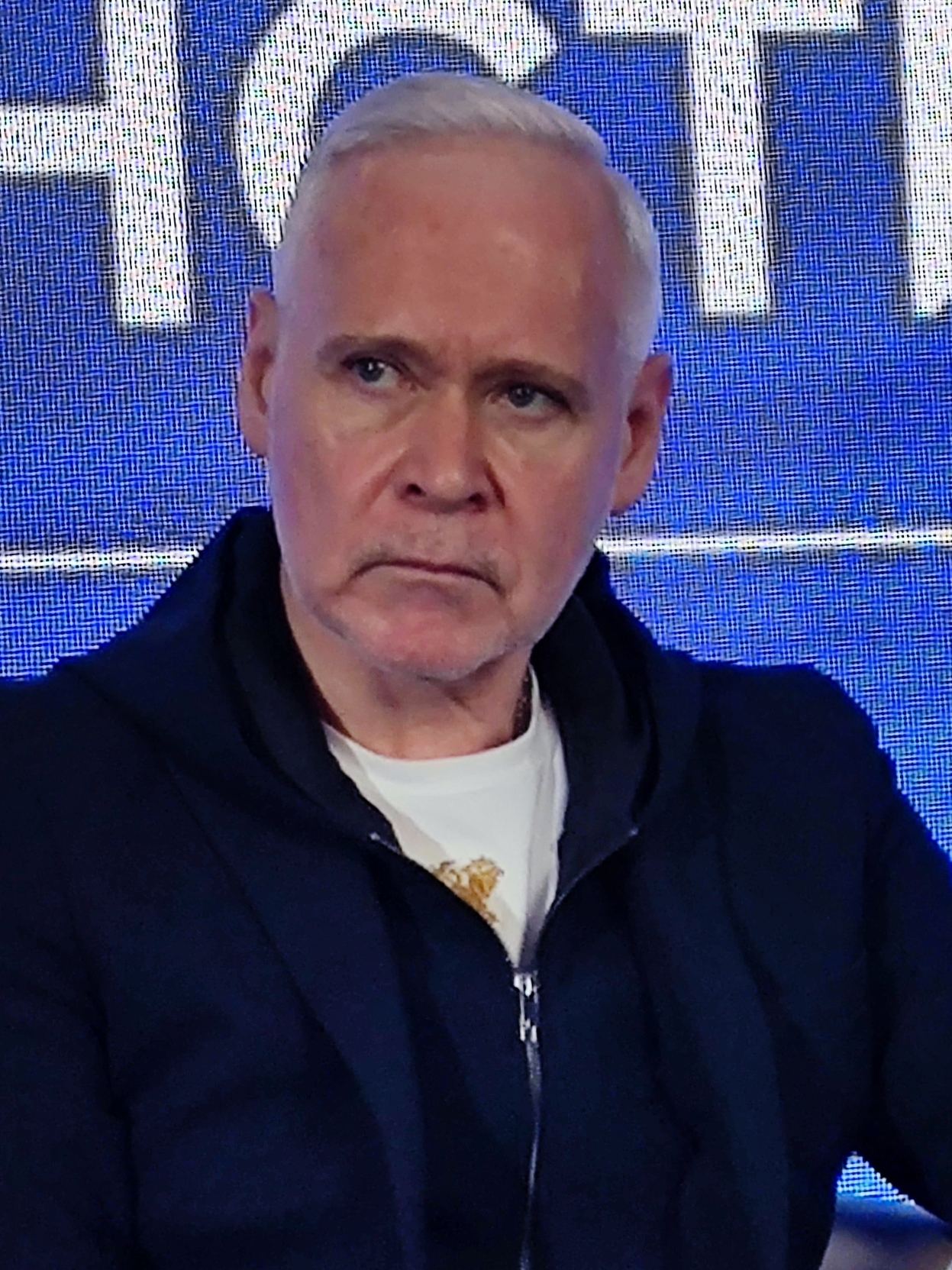
- Terekhov in 2025

6th Mayor of Kharkiv
- Incumbent
- Assumed office 11 November 2021; Acting from: 24 December 2020
- Preceded by: Hennadiy Kernes

Personal details
- Born: 14 January 1967 (age 59) Kharkiv, Ukrainian SSR, Soviet Union (now Ukraine)
- Citizenship: Soviet (until 1991); Ukrainian (from 1991)
- Party: Successful Kharkiv (since 2020)
- Other political affiliations: Revival (2015–2019); Opposition Bloc (2019–2020)
- Spouse: Hanna Kuznietsova
- Children: 3
- Education: Kharkiv Engineering and Construction Institute (MS); National Academy of State Administration (Candidate of Sciences)
- Profession: Civil Engineer, Economist
- Website: Official mayoral website

Ihor Oleksandrovych Terekhov (Ukrainian: Ігор Олександрович Терехов; born 14 January 1967) is a Ukrainian politician who is serving as the mayor of Kharkiv since 11 November 2021. He ascended to the mayoralty on 24 December 2020 following Hennadiy Kernes death due to COVID-19 complications. The Kharkiv early mayoral election was held on 31 October 2021, and Terekhov was declared the winner of the election with 50.66% of the votes.

== Biography ==
=== Early life ===
Terekhov was born on 14 January 1967 in Kharkiv.

In 1990, Terekhov graduated from the Kharkiv Engineering and Construction Institute (now O. M. Beketov National University of Urban Economy in Kharkiv). After which he remained at the university as a research intern.

In 1994, Terekhov began working at CJSC Ukrkondytsioner (a heating, ventilation, and air conditioning equipment manufacturer). In 1997, he was appointed Chairman of the Shareholders' Council and Chairman of the Management Board of the company, which was subsequently renamed OJSC Kharkiv Plant "Kondytsioner".

From 1999 to 2006, he served as Head of the Department for Entrepreneurship and later as Head of the Department of the Communal Consumer Market for the Kharkiv City Council. In 2006, Terekhov graduated from the National Academy for Public Administration.

Starting in 1989, Terekhov served as an assistant referee in the Soviet Second League. Following Ukraine's independence, he began officiating in the Ukrainian Football Championship in 1992, working both as a head referee and an assistant referee. That same year, he made his debut in the Ukrainian Premier League as part of Leonid Bavykin refereeing team for a match between Chornomorets Odesa and Evis Mykolaiv. In total, he officiated 52 top-flight Ukrainian matches as an assistant referee, while serving as a head referee exclusively in the First and Second leagues. Terekhov also held the status of a FIFA assistant referee, officiating in the UEFA Intertoto Cup and the UEFA Cup Winners' Cup. He retired from refereeing in 1998. According to Igor Gorozhankin, a contemporary referee of that era, Terekhov's career advancement in football was aided by his connections with football official Kostiantyn Vykhrov.

=== Political career ===
In the 2006 Ukrainian parliamentary election, Terekhov was a candidate for the Our Ukraine Bloc, but was not elected. In 2007 was appointed the Deputy Head of Governor of Kharkiv Oblast Arsen Avakov. By a decree of President Viktor Yushchenko in 2007, Terekhov was awarded the honorary title of Honored Economist of Ukraine. In the same year, the Higher Attestation Commission of Ukraine awarded him the degree of Candidate of Sciences in Public Administration.

In 2007, local media described Terekhov as a close associate of Arsen Avakov. However, in 2010, following Avakov's dismissal from the post of Chairman of the Kharkiv Oblast State Administration, Terekhov aligned himself with Avakov's political and business opponents, Mykhailo Dobkin and Hennadiy Kernes. In April 2010, Terekhov was appointed Deputy Mayor of Kharkiv. In November 2010, by a decision of the Kharkiv City Council during its 6th convocation, he was confirmed as Deputy Mayor for City Development and Infrastructure. In September 2015, he was promoted to the position of First Deputy Mayor.

In the October 2015 Kharkiv local election, Terekhov was elected as a deputy to the Kharkiv City Council, representing the Revival. He subsequently became the leader of the party's parliamentary faction in the council and served as a member of the standing committee on planning, budget, and finance. In 2019, he took over as head of the Opposition Bloc in the Kharkiv City Council.

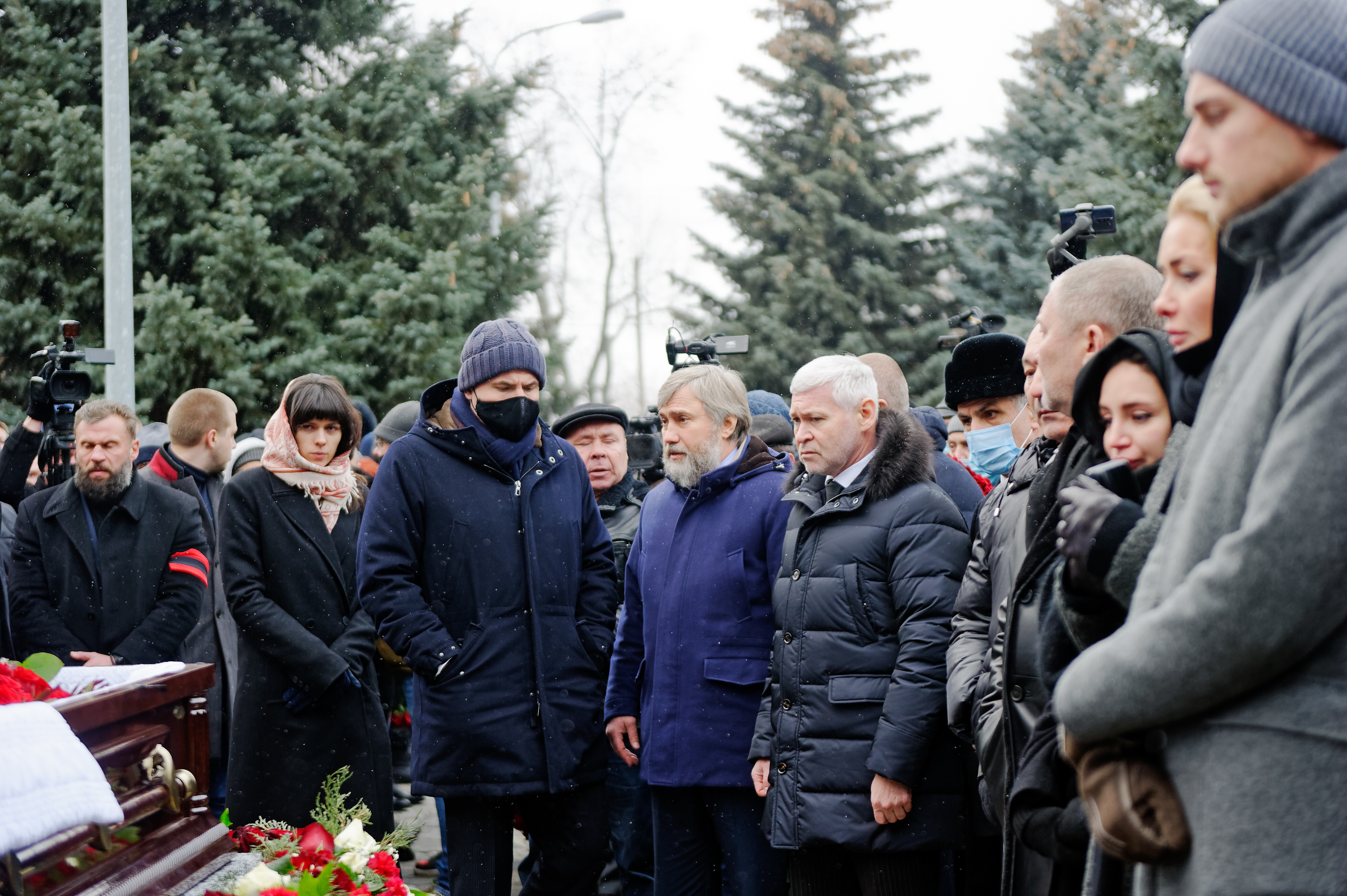
Ihor Terekhov at the funeral of Hennadiy Kernes

In the October 2020 Kharkiv local election Terekhov was in second place on the party list and was re-elected for the party Kernes Bloc — Successful Kharkiv, the party of then incumbent Mayor Hennadiy Kernes.

On 9 December 2020, during a session of the Kharkiv City Council, Terekhov was elected as its Secretary, with 73 out of 84 deputies voting in favor of his candidacy. On 17 December 2020 Kernes died in Berlin of COVID-19. After the death of Kernes his duties were performed by City Council Secretary Terekhov.

=== Mayor of Kharkiv ===
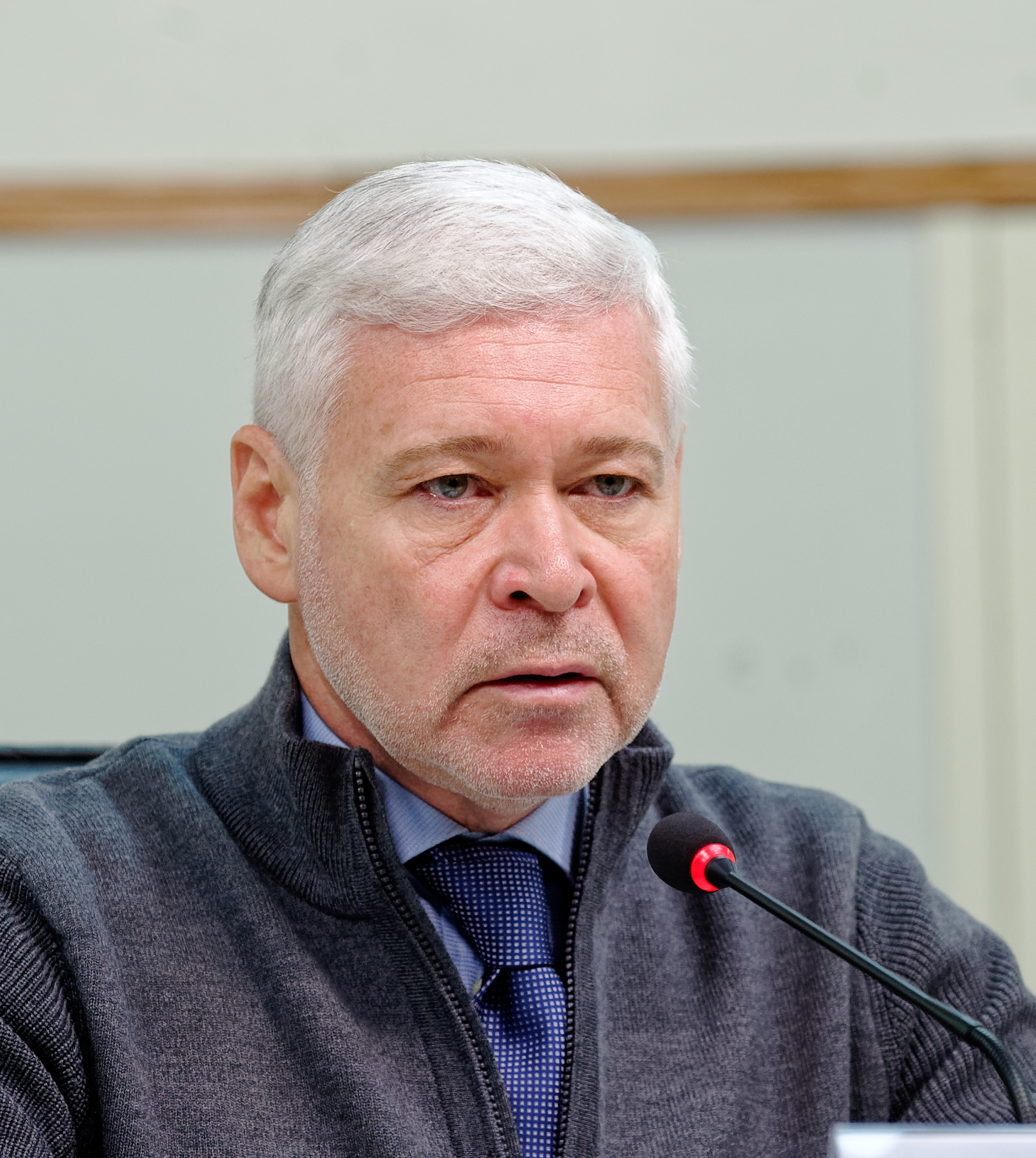
Ihor Terekhov, Acting Mayor of Kharkiv, 2021

The Kharkiv City Council terminated the powers of Kernes on 24 December 2020 On 30 March 2021 the Ukrainian parliament set the date for the Kharkiv early mayoral election on 31 October 2021. In this election Successful Kharkiv nominated Terekhov as its mayoral candidate.

In May 2021, Terekhov promised that the Kharkiv City Council would appeal a ruling by the Kharkiv District Administrative Court that revoked the regional status of the Russian language in Kharkiv. However, the appeal was rejected because the City Council's legal team failed to file the documents on time and did not meet the proper filing requirements.

Terekhov advocated for reverting the name of Petro Grigorenko Avenue back to "Marshal Zhukov Avenue," despite accusations from critics that this violated the Ukrainian decommunization laws (specifically the law "On Condemning the Communist and National Socialist Regimes"). However, the Kharkiv City Council lost three consecutive court cases regarding the renaming. Additionally, Terekhov opposed the dismantling of the Georgy Zhukov bust in Kharkiv.

The election commission declared Terekhov the winner of the election with 50.66% of the votes. Mykhailo Dobkin finished the race in second place with 28.4% of the vote. Observers reported numerous irregularities in the election and tried to annul the results of 9 polling stations through court. At an extraordinary session of the Kharkiv City Council on 11 November 2021 Terekhov was sworn in as the new Mayor of Kharkiv.

==== Russian invasion of Ukraine ====
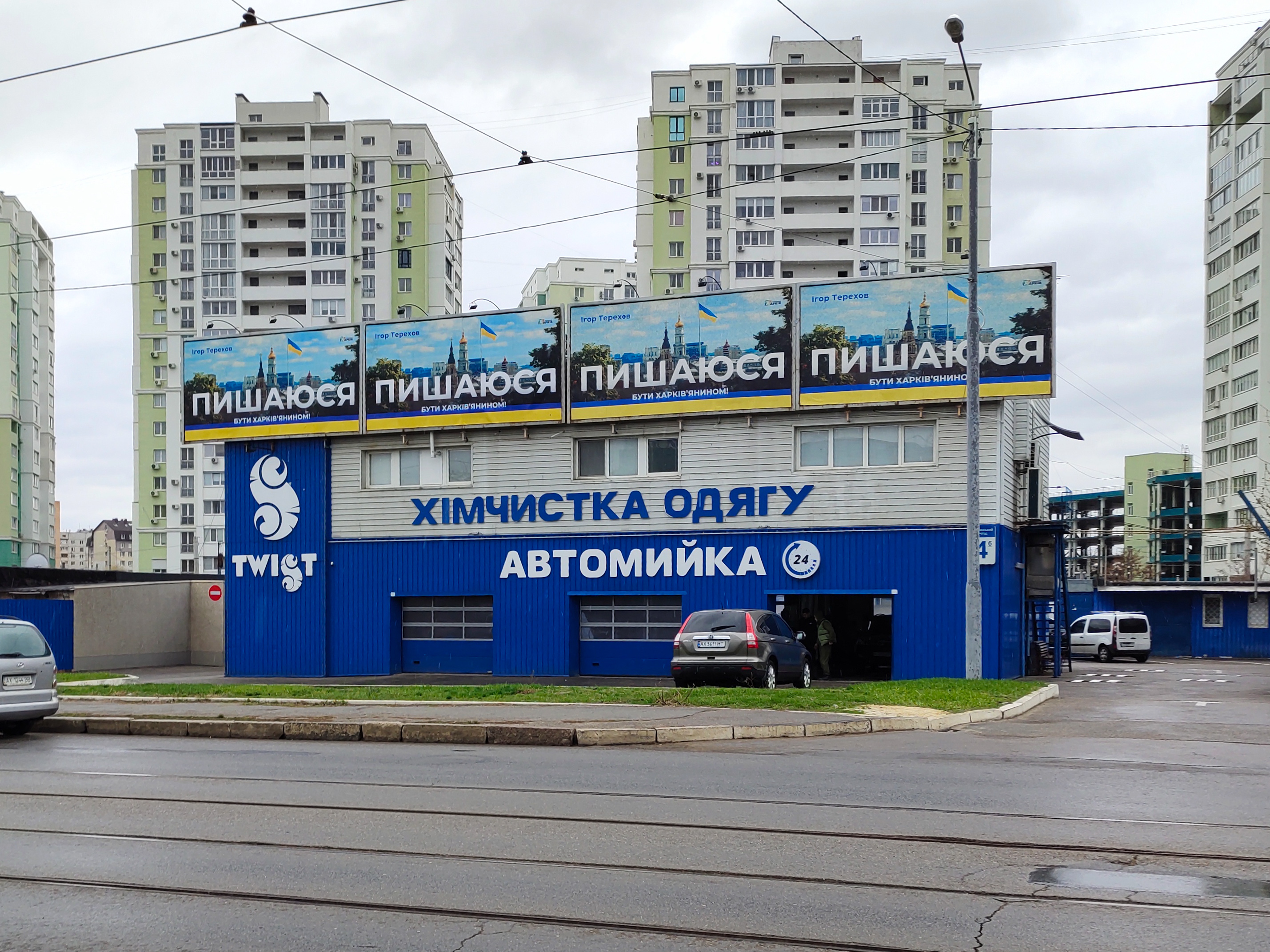

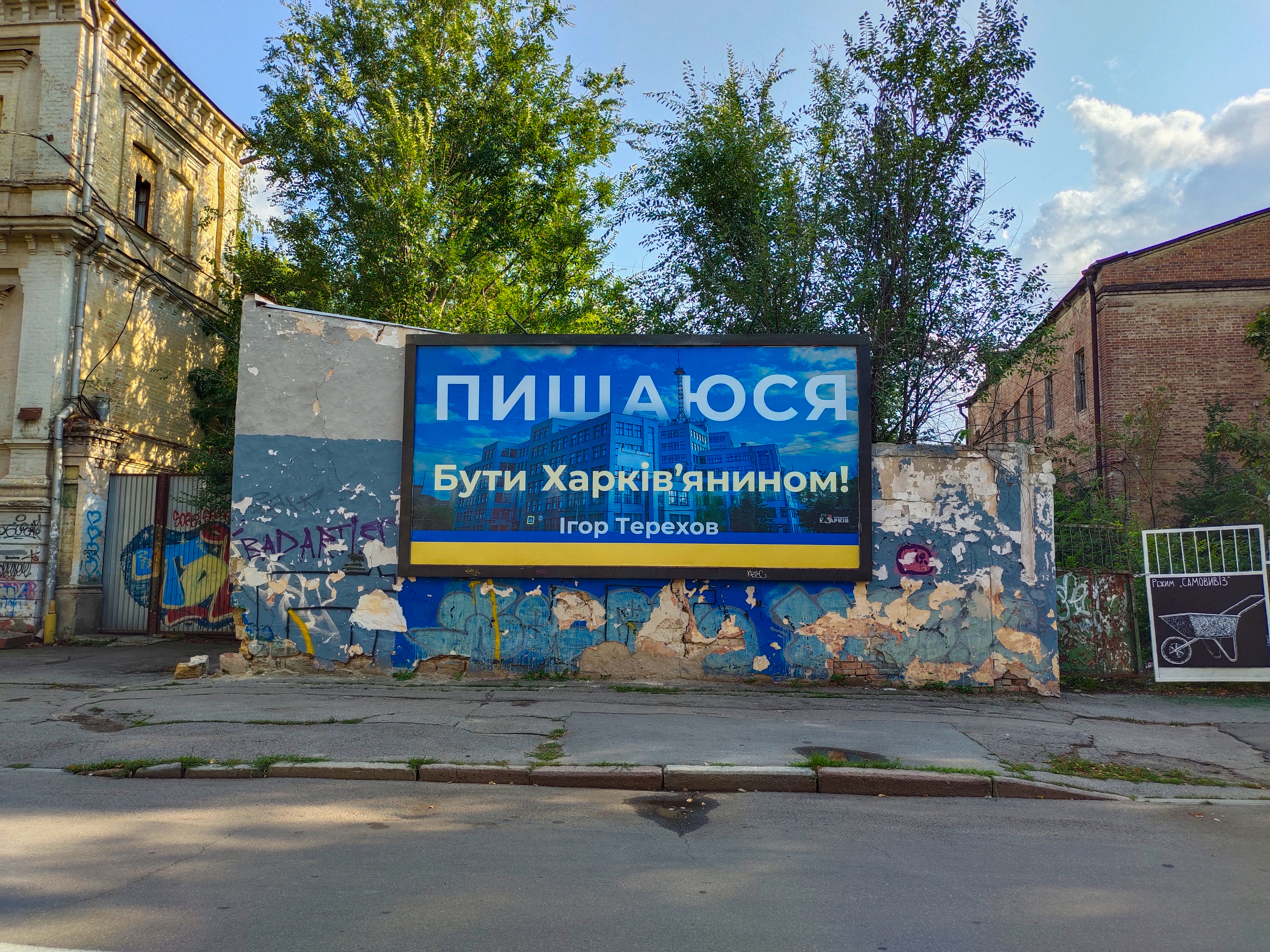
Posters of Ihor Terekhov and Successful Kharkiv in 2025. The text reads: "Proud to be a Kharkiv Resident!" They were installed throughout the city, for which they were criticized.

Following the 2022 Russian invasion of Ukraine, Terekhov introduced free public transportation throughout Kharkiv. Under martial law, his administration implemented several social initiatives, including the provision of free communal meals, the establishment of public water distribution stations, and various other humanitarian aid programs.

On October 5, 2022, Taras Kremin, Ukraine's Language Ombudsman, criticized Terekhov for speaking in Russian on air, but did not impose a fine.

On November 24, Terekhov again spoke in Russian while on air for a telethon, and Kremin in turn imposed a fine of 3,400 Hryvnias for not speaking in Ukrainian. In response, Terekhov stated that "the most important matter is victory" in the war, and that he promised to "speak Ukrainian in official matters", but will continue to "speak Russian during communication with Kharkiv residents". He later made clear that he would pay the fine.

On December 29, Taras Kremin again imposed a fine on Terekhov, this time for using Russian in the mayor's social media pages. On January 12, 2023, Terekhov appealed the fine on administrative grounds, which was successful by a court decision in April. After this incident, the mayor's pages switched to using Ukrainian. In July 2023, Terekhov admitted that "the war has changed the mentality of both Kharkiv residents and Ukrainians", and that he now believes "it is necessary to speak Ukrainian".

On 18 September 2025, Terekhov initiated the creation of the Association of Frontline Cities and Hromadas of Ukraine and became its head.

In April 2026, Terekhov and his administration faced domestic criticism regarding their fiscal policies. Opponents accused the municipal leadership of prioritizing politically popular subsidized initiatives, such as free public transportation, over long-term fiscal stability. Critics and political opponents characterized these measures as left-wing populism, arguing that the public relations benefits of the programs came at the expense of managing the city's mounting municipal debt and addressing the deteriorating financial condition of communal services.

== Personal life ==
Terekhov identifies as ethnically Russian, and has said that his government documents state so as well. He has also added that his father was Jewish.

Father — Oleksandr, was a sports physician.

Mother — Viktoriia. The enterprise OJSC KhP "Kondytsioner" was registered under her name after Terekhov became a public official.

Divorced, has three children. From his first marriage — a son, Mykola (born 1995); from his second marriage — Matvii (born 2003) and Andrii (born 2006).

As of December 2021, Terekhov was in a relationship with Hanna Kuznietsova, a deputy of the Kharkiv Oblast Council of the 7th and 8th convocations.

According to his 2019 financial disclosure, Terekhov declared ₴6 million in cash savings. He also jointly owned two apartments in Kharkiv with his mother and leased a Mercedes-Benz GL 350 automobile.

== Awards ==
- Order of Courage, 2nd class (2025) – "for significant personal contribution to state-building, development of local self-government, selfless performance of official duty under martial law, and loyalty to the Ukrainian people."
- Order of Courage, 3rd class (2022) – "for significant personal contribution to the protection of state sovereignty and territorial integrity of Ukraine, courage and selfless actions displayed during the defense of populated areas from Russian invaders."
- Order of Merit, 3rd class (2012) – "for significant personal contribution to the socio-economic, scientific, technical, cultural, and educational development of Kharkiv Oblast, significant labor achievements, and high professional skill."
- Honored Economist of Ukraine (18 January 2007)
- "Golden Trident" Medal (2023) – Distinction of the Ministry of Defence of Ukraine
- Honorary Diploma of the Cabinet of Ministers of Ukraine (2016)
- Honorary Diploma of the Verkhovna Rada of Ukraine (2004)
- "Slobozhanska Slava" (Slobozhansky Glory) Honorary Badge of the Kharkiv Oblast Council (2016)
- Honorary Diploma of the Kharkiv Oblast State Administration and Oblast Council (2004)
- Honorary Diploma of the Kharkiv City Executive Committee (2002)
- "For Diligence" Honorary Badge of the Mayor of Kharkiv, dedicated to the 350th anniversary of the founding of Kharkiv (1654–2004) (2004)

== See also ==
- List of mayors of Kharkiv
