= Kernes Bloc — Successful Kharkiv =

Kernes Bloc — Successful Kharkiv Блок Кернеса — Успішний Харків
- Leader: Ihor Terekhov
- Founder: Hennadiy Kernes
- Founded: early 2020
- Registered: 12 April 2016 (Unitary European Ukraine); 17 October 2019 (Kernes Bloc — Successful Kharkiv)
- Merger of: Revival
- Headquarters: Skrypnika St. 4 Kharkiv. 61057
- Newspaper: Successful Kharkiv
- Youth wing: Youth of Successful Kharkiv
- Ideology: Social democracy Left-wing populism Social conservatism Kharkiv regionalism Decentralization
- Political position: Centre-left to left-wing
- National affiliation: Opposition Bloc (2019)
- Colours: Green; Blue; Red; Yellow
- Slogan: Loving Kharkivshchyna is Working for the people! (Russian: «Любить Харьковщину — работать для людей!») (Ukrainian: «Любити Харкiвщину — працювати для людей!»)
- Kharkiv City Council: 34 / 85
- Kharkiv Oblast Council: 46 / 120

Website
- uspishniy.kharkiv.ua

Kernes Bloc — Successful Kharkiv (Ukrainian: Блок Кернеса — Успішний Харків, romanized: Blok Kernesa — Uspishnyi Kharkiv) is a political party of Ukraine, registered on April 12, 2016. The founder and first head of the political party was Hennadiy Kernes, who created it with the aim of participating in local elections in the Kharkiv Oblast, both in the City Council and in the Oblast Council.

== History ==
=== Name ===
- 12 April 2016 – 17 October 2019: Unitary European Ukraine (Унітарна Європейська Україна)
- since 17 October 2019: Kernes Bloc — Successful Kharkiv (Блок Кернеса — Успішний Харків)

=== Establishment ===
On June 2, 2019, the founding congress of the new party Trust in Deeds took place in Kharkiv, the two co-chairs of which were chosen as the city heads of Kharkiv and Odesa, Hennadiy Kernes and Gennadiy Trukhanov.

In the July 2019 Ukrainian parliamentary election, Kernes and Trukhanov was placed in the top ten of the party list of Opposition Bloc. However, the nationwide list of this party won just 3.23% of the votes, failing to overcome the 5% election barrier and keeping Kernes from a seat in the Verkhovna Rada.

At the end of 2019, the party was renamed into "Kernes Bloc — Successful Kharkiv", after which many rumors began to circulate around the party about its participation in the 2020 local elections, led by Mayor of Kharkiv Hennadiy Kernes, which he himself did not deny.

Already in early 2020, Hennadiy Kernes announced that he was going to the elections to the Kharkiv City Council with his own bloc, without the Trust in Deeds party, which he led together with Gennadiy Trukhanov and the Opposition Bloc, which did not participate in the local elections as a united front. in favor of small electoral blocs such as the Vadym Boychenko Bloc, Vilkul Bloc — Ukrainian Perspective, Volodymyr Buryak — United, and Gennadiy Trukhanov Trust Deeds party.

=== 2020/2021 Kharkiv local elections ===
Support for the party in 2020 Kharkiv local elections (marked in green)

In the 2020 Kharkiv local elections, Kernes won the first round of voting with a result of 61.2%, and the Kernes Bloc – Successful Kharkiv received a result of 37.98% in the Kharkiv City Council and 30.1% in the Kharkiv Oblast Council.

Kernes died on 17 December 2020. The snap mayoral election in Kharkiv to determinate Kernes successor was set on 31 October 2021. In this election Kernes Bloc — Successful Kharkiv nominated Ihor Terekhov as its mayoral candidate. Terekhov had been acting Kharkiv Mayor since 24 December 2020. Terekhov officially won the election with 50.66% of the votes. At an extraordinary session of the Kharkiv City Council on 11 November 2021 Terekhov was sworn in as the new Mayor of Kharkiv.

==== Post-election ====
From the first days of 2022 Russian invasion of Ukraine, the Kernes Bloc – Successful Kharkiv took a pro-Ukrainian position. Despite the position of the political party, collaborationism was widespread among its members. Thus, the mayor of Balakliia, Ivan Stolbovy, agreed to cooperate with the Russian Armed Forces. Representatives of local councils from the Kernes Bloc began cooperation with the Russian administration.

On December 1, 2022, deputies from the party "for technical reasons" (they could not find electricity and connect to the Internet) did not appear at the session of the Kharkiv Oblast Council, which was supposed to be held online and during which it was planned to consider the issue of renaming the Kharkiv Academic Drama Theater named after Alexander Pushkin, awarding the title of honorary citizen of the Kharkiv Oblast (among the candidates is also the deputy from Successful Kharkiv Oleg Karatumanov, a former People's Deputy of Ukraine of the Party of Regions) and taking into account the balance of defensive fortifications in the Kharkiv Oblast. Deputies from the Restoration of Ukraine faction (formerly Opposition Platform — For Life) also did not appear at the session.

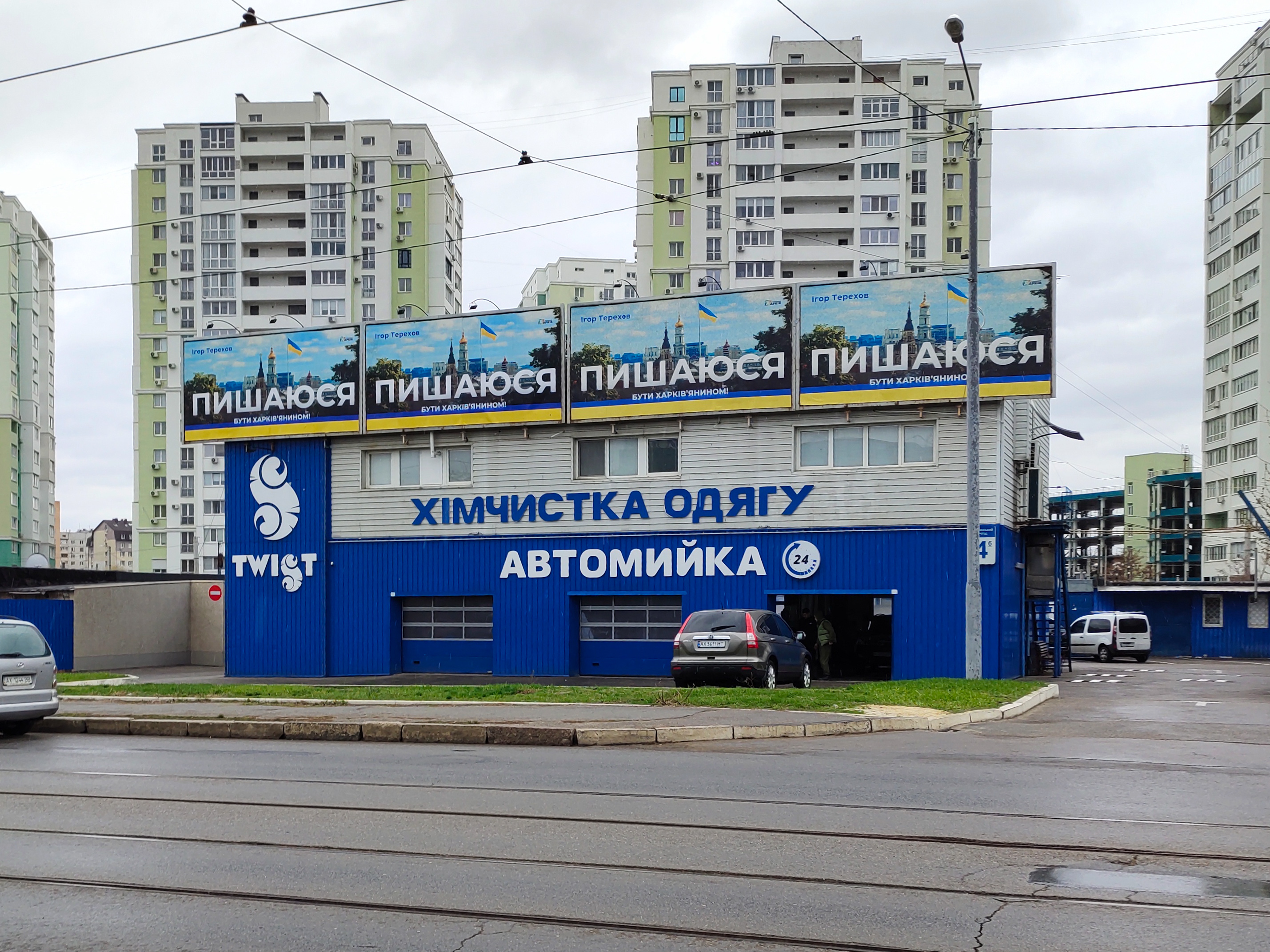

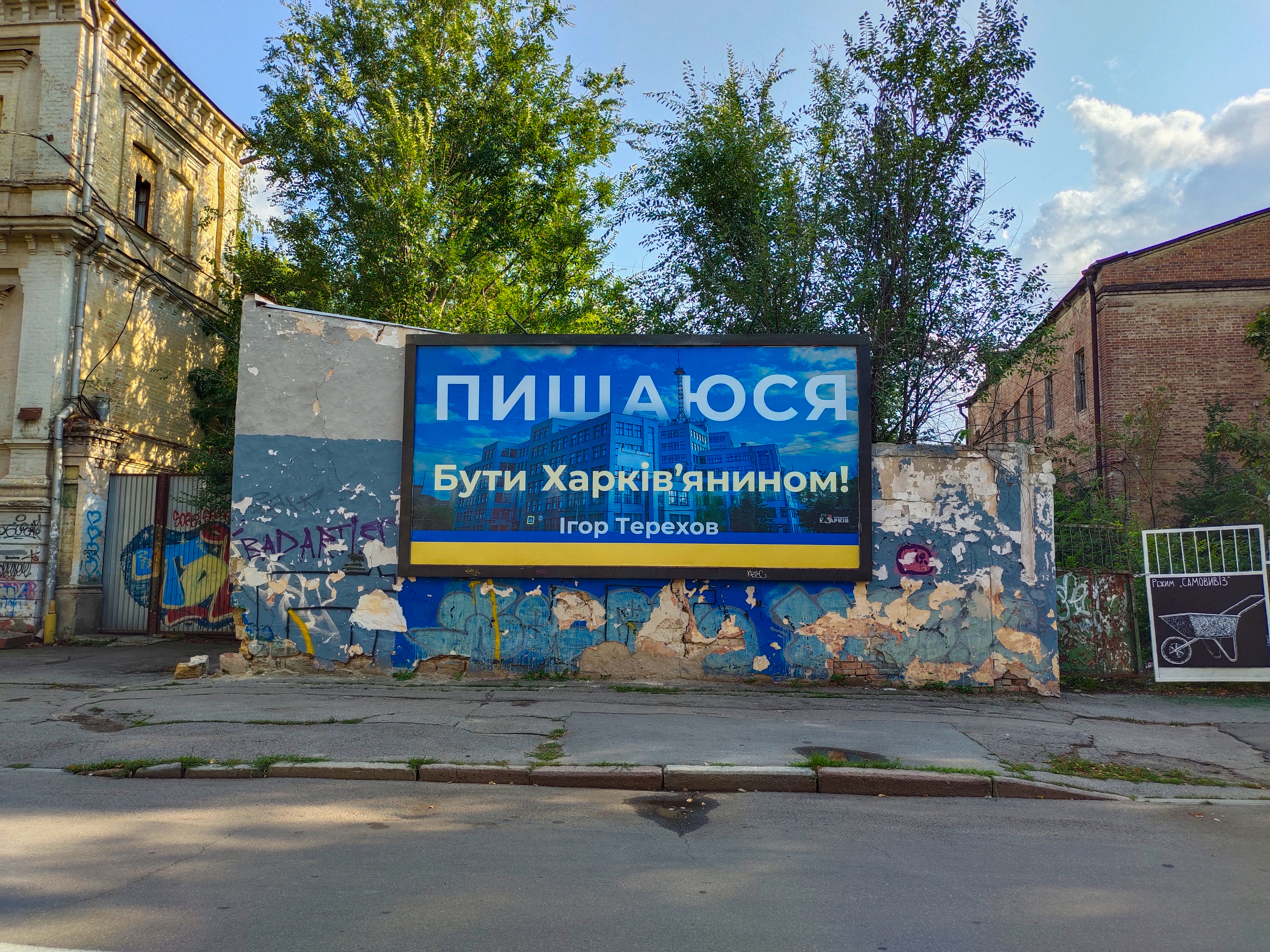
Posters of Ihor Terekhov and Successful Kharkiv in 2025. The text reads: "Proud to be a Kharkiv Resident!" They were installed throughout the city, for which they were criticized.

In 2023, the eldest son of the late Hennadiy Kernes, Kyrylo Kernes, sharply criticized the political force Successful Kharkiv, accusing his former party members of usurping power in the city. This happened a year after Kyrylo Kernes was officially expelled from the Kernes Bloc — Successful Kharkiv faction in the Kharkiv Oblast Council. At the same time, he announced his intention to run for mayor of Kharkiv in the next local elections to continue his father's policies.

In April 2025, former Vice Mayor of Kharkiv Andriy Rudenko, who had been cooperating with the Batkivshchyna party since at least the winter of 2025, left the party and the Kernes Bloc — Successful Kharkiv faction. Three months later, Rudenko was taken into custody in a case of embezzlement of money for the construction of fortifications during the Battle of Kharkiv.

In November 2025, the National Agency on Corruption Prevention began an investigation into the legality of placing advertisements on behalf of Ihor Terekhov on banners in Kharkiv with party branding.

In April 2026, reports emerged in several media outlets alleging that the Kernes Bloc — Successful Kharkiv had accumulated substantial unpaid debts for billboard advertising. While party spokesperson Madina Hololobova issued a formal denial refuting these claims, the allegations surfaced amidst a wave of corruption scandals and intensifying criticism of the party and its leader, Ihor Terekhov. Critics and political analysts have increasingly linked the party’s financial controversies to the broader fiscal challenges facing Kharkiv, specifically citing the city's significant debt levels. This financial strain is often attributed to the administration's "left-wing" social agenda, with particular scrutiny directed at the subsidized management of public transportation and communal services.

== Ideology ==
The party declares 30 strategic steps for the development of the Kharkiv Oblast and Kharkiv itself. In relation to the central government, it positions itself as the opposition, and between Hennadiy Kernes and the former Head of the Kharkiv Regional State Administration Oleksiy Kucher there were quite tense relations. According to political scientists, the party is regionalist in ideology.

The party was formed mainly from former members of the Party of Regions and took a moderate pro-Russian position. After the Russian invasion of Ukraine, the party adopted a pro-Ukrainian position, despite the fact that collaborationism was widespread among party members.

Many opponents of Kernes, accused him of establishing his personal power in Kharkiv, corruption and budget embezzlement on various city projects. In particular, Kernes was accused of creating a mafia clan in Kharkiv and putting enormous pressure on small and medium-sized businesses.

Since 2022, following the Russian invasion of Ukraine, Kharkiv Mayor Ihor Terekhov has declared all public transportation in Kharkiv free. During martial law in Ukraine, numerous social projects have been implemented in Kharkiv, including free lunches, free water stations, and a number of other initiatives. In April 2026, Ihor Terekhov and his administration faced intensifying criticism for their "left-wing" policy agenda, with opponents accusing the leadership of prioritizing political visibility through subsidized initiatives, such as free public transportation, at the expense of fiscal stability. These accusations emerged alongside concerns over the city's mounting municipal debt and the deteriorating financial condition of communal services, which critics argue have been neglected in favor of left-wing populist public relations campaigns.

== Youth wing ==
In 2021, the youth wing of the political party Kernes Bloc — Successful Kharkiv was created. Today, the youth of this political force is actively involved in organizing scientific, cultural, sports, environmental and educational events, and also participates in the formation and development of the youth environment in Kharkiv.

== Leadership ==
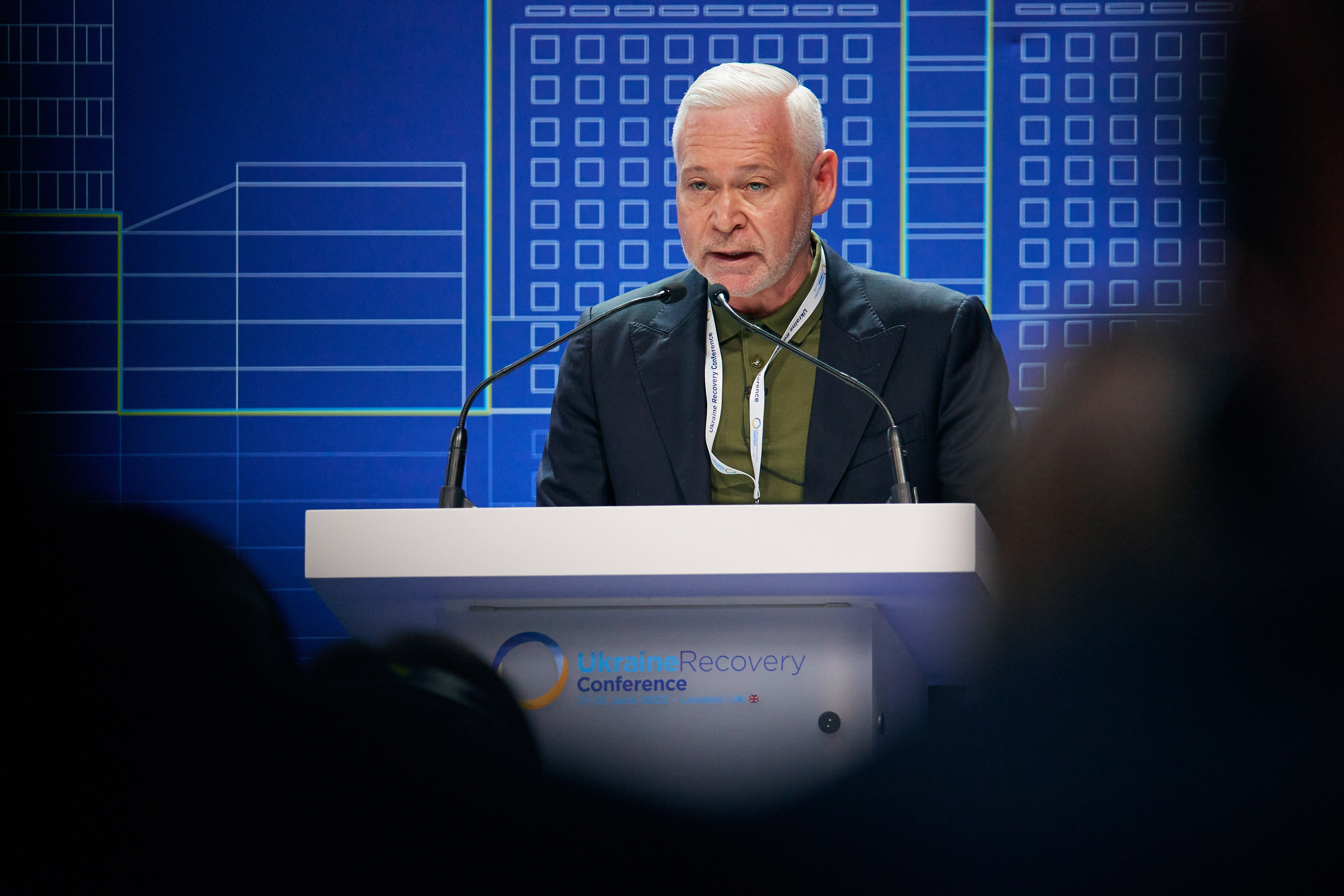
Ihor Terekhov, Mayor of Kharkiv, speaking at the Ukraine Recovery Conference 2023 in Greenwich, United Kingdom.

Until December 17, 2020, the leader of the party was the mayor of Kharkiv, Hennadiy Kernes, after his death, the party was headed by Ihor Terekhov.

Party Chair — Tetyana Chechetova-Terashvili.

Faction Chair in the Kharkiv City Council — Oleksandr Novak.

Faction Chair in the Kharkiv Oblast Council — Nelly Tsybulnyk.

== Election results ==
=== Kharkiv City Council ===
Year	Popular vote	% of popular vote	Overall seats won	Seat change	Government
2020	117,470	37.98	34 / 85	▲34	Majority

=== Kharkiv Oblast Council ===
Year	Popular vote	% of popular vote	Overall seats won	Seat change	Government
2020	211,952	30.1	46 / 120	▲46	Majority

=== Mayoral elections ===
Year	Candidate	First round			Second round		Won/Loss
Year	Candidate	Votes	%	Rank	Votes	%	Won/Loss
2020	Hennadiy Kernes	195,044	61.2%	1st			Won
2021	Ihor Terekhov	146,240	50.66%	1st			Won

== See also ==
- Volodymyr Saldo Bloc
- Our Land
- Opposition Bloc
- Proposition
- All-Ukrainian Union "Cherkashchany"
- Native Zakarpattia
- Bila Tserkva Together
