= 2020 Kharkiv local elections =

Local elections in Ukraine

- 25 October 2020
- Mayoral election
- Turnout: 31.36% ▼11.05 pp
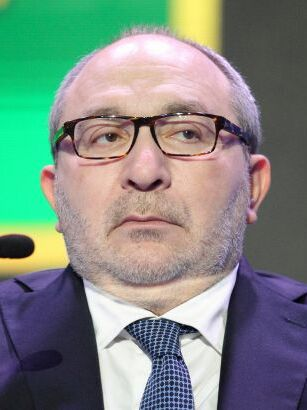

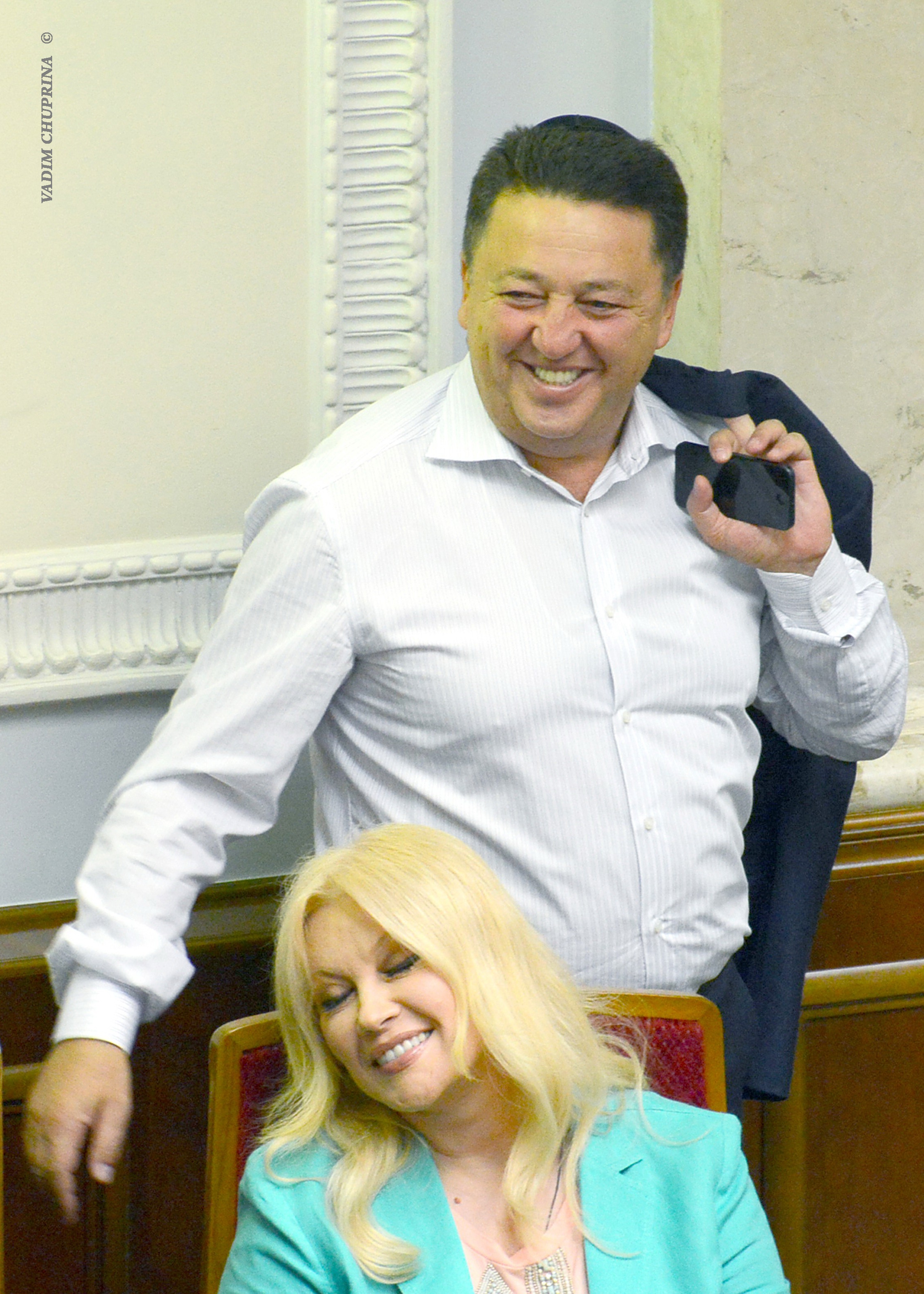

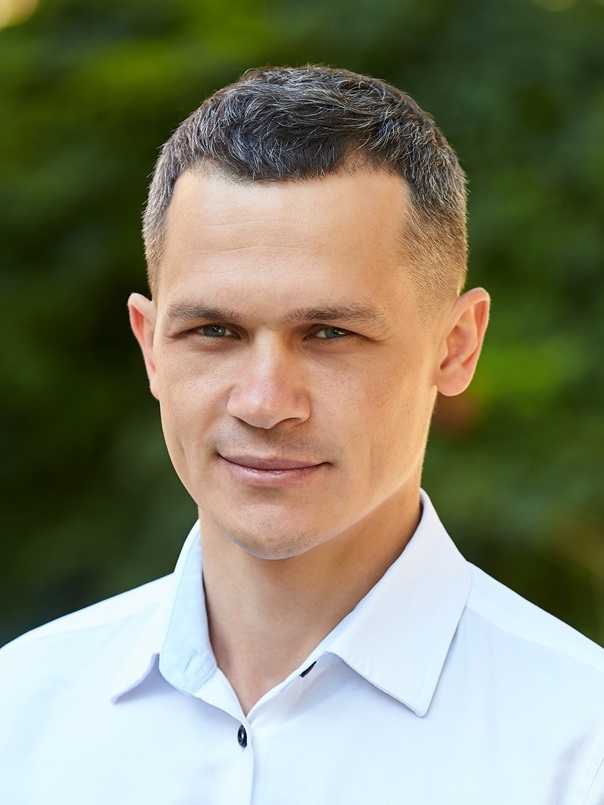
Candidate	Hennadiy Kernes	Oleksandr Feldman
Party	Kernes Bloc	Opposition Platform
Popular vote	195,044	46,278
Percentage	61.52%	14.60%
Candidate	Oleksiy Kucher	Oleh Abramychev
Party	Servant of the People	European Solidarity
Popular vote	23,401	21,315
Percentage	7.38%	6.72%
Mayor before election
Hennadiy Kernes
Revival
Elected mayor
Hennadiy Kernes
Kernes Bloc
- City Council election
- All 84 seats in the Kharkiv City Council; 43 seats needed for a majority
Party	Leader	Vote %	Seats	+/–
Kernes Bloc	Hennadiy Kernes	37.95	34	New
Opposition Platform	Oleksandr Feldman	20.96	19	New
European Solidarity	Oleh Abramychev	8.99	9	+2
Servant of the People	Oleksiy Kucher	8.76	7	New
PSh	Mykyta Rozhenko	6.55	7	New
Svitlychna Bloc	Yuliya Svitlychna	6.14	6	New
This lists parties that won seats. See the complete results below.
Results by district
Secretary before	Secretary after
Oleksandr Novak; Revival	Ihor Terekhov; Kernes Bloc

Local elections were held in Kharkiv on 25 October 2020 to elect the Mayor of Kharkiv and the 84-seat Kharkiv City Council as a part of wider 2020 Ukrainian local elections, which took place on the same day.

== Electoral system ==
These were the first elections held under the newly adopted Electoral Code, which provided a fully proportional electoral system at the both local and national levels.

Kharkiv was divided into 7 districts with an unfixed amount of seats. Each party had to form two lists: the first is united for the entire city, and the second is for individual territorial districts. The party would receive a mandate if it overcomes the 5% threshold. In this case, the No.1 candidate on the list is guaranteed to receive a seat. Candidates who receive 25% or more of the electoral quota of their district get to the top of the list in descending order of the number of votes for them. In the case of an equal number of votes, the order of candidates will remain as determined by the party at the time of voting. After the candidates who passed to the council according to the quota, the rest are placed in the order determined by the party.

Electoral quota is the number of votes needed to obtain one seat. The electoral quota is determined by the territorial election commission. For this, the commission needed to divide the total number of votes for those parties that won at least 5 percent of the voters' votes and are now participating in the distribution of mandates by the number of mandates. The number of seats into which the electoral votes had to be divided is the difference between the number of seats in the Kharkiv City Council and the number of guaranteed seats for each party that entered the council (one seat per party).

== Mayoral candidates ==
- Hennadiy Kernes - Kernes began his political career being elected to the Kharkiv City Council in 1998, serving three terms as the leader of the "New Kharkiv - New Opportunities" independent bloc. In 2006 he was elected to the council as a member of the Party of Regions and had been the incumbent mayor of Kharkiv since he won the 2010 Ukrainian local elections. Kernes was initially described as pro-Russian and was accused of organizing and supporting anti-Maidan forces in Kharkiv during Euromaidan. After his criminal trial for allegedly torturing Euromaidan participants was dropped, Kernes pivoted to being pro-Ukrainian, switching his party affiliation to Revival and was able to win re-election in the 2015 Ukrainian local elections. Kernes also unsuccessfully sought a seat in the Verkhovna Rada during the 2019 Ukrainian parliamentary election for the Opposition Bloc, getting only 3.23%, short of the 5% to enter parliament. In late 2019 Kernes effectively took over a small local party, "Unitary European Ukraine" and transformed it into Kernes Bloc — Successful Kharkiv as a vehicle for him and his supporters to establish themselves as the primer political force within the city, not beholden to any existing national parties.
- Oleksandr Feldman - Feldman is one of Kharkiv's leading oligarchs, worth USD$287m, making him the 35th richest man in Ukraine. President of the Ukrainian Jewish Committee, Feldman was elected to the Verkhovna Rada in the 2002 Ukrainian parliamentary election for United Ukraine, joining the party in its merger with Batkivshchyna. He would be re-elected in 2006 and 2007 as a member of the Yulia Tymoshenko Bloc before leaving the party and joining Party of Regions, citing an uncomfortable amount of nationalism within the former. Feldman would be re-elected in 2012, and became a political independent for his re-election in 2014 before joining Our Land and being re-elected in 2019, shortly afterwards he joined Opposition Platform — For Life and was named the party's candidate for mayor.
- Oleksiy Kucher - Kucher is a Kherson native and attended the Yaroslav Mudryi National Law University, choosing to stay in Kharkiv after his graduation. Kucher was elected to the Verkhovna Rada in the 2019 Ukrainian parliamentary election as a member of Servant of the People. On 19 October 2019, Kucher was appointed the Governor of Kharkiv Oblast by Ukrainian president Volodymyr Zelenskyy and was named Servant of the People's candidate for the mayoral election.
- Oleh Abramychev
- Ihor Cherniak
- Oleksandra Naryzhna
- Mykyta Soloviov

== Opinion polls ==
=== City Council election ===
Fieldwork date	Polling firm	Sample size	Revival (Ukraine)	Self Reliance (political party)	European Solidarity	Our Land (Ukraine)	Batkivshchyna	Svoboda (political party)	Opposition Bloc	Civil Position	Trust the Deeds	Holos (political party)	Opposition Platform — For Life	Servant of the People	Strength and Honor	Victory of Palchevskyi	Party of Shariy	Kernes Bloc — Successful Kharkiv	Bloc Svitlychna — Together!	Other	Lead
25 October 2020	Liberty Report/Ukraine 24	12,765	—	—	9,2	1,7	1,5	1,1	—	—	—	2,1	17,0	12,4	0,4	0,7	6,4	39,5	5,4	2,6	22,5
Exit polls
5-11 October 2020	Dialogue	1,600	—	—	4,2	1,0	1,8	0,3	—	—	—	0,9	15,4	7,8	—	0,9	3,5	54,7	7,0	2,5	39,3
25-27 September 2020	Public Opinion	1,200	—	—	5,8	7,9	—	—	—	—	—	—	21,4	11,4	—	—	—	31,7	13,3	8,5 (Note: Against all - 3,7%)	3,7
20-22 September 2020	Info Sapiens/IRI	600	—	0,5	11	1	1	1	3	0,2	0,3	2	15	11	1	—	6	31	5	11 (Note: None of the above - 4%)	16
25 January-17 February 2020	Rating/IRI	633	—	1,2	4,9	—	3,7	—	2,4	1,2	—	2,4	29,3	30,5	2,4	—	6,1	—	—	15,9	1,2
6 September-10 October 2019	Rating/IRI	689	—	—	3,4	—	1,1	—	14,8	—	—	2,3	17,0	48,9	1,1	—	4,6	—	—	6,8	31,9
6-11 November 2019	SMC	833	2,3	1,1	3,4	—	3,4	3,1	3,4	2,3	28,7	2,3	14,9	29,9	0,9	—	2,3	—	—	2,0	25,5
25 October 2015	2015 Kyiv local election		53,64	11,85	6,76	6,67	3,43	1,99	—	—	—	—	—	—	—	—	—	—	—	15,67	41,79

=== Mayoral election ===
Fieldwork date	Polling firm	Sample size	Kernes	Davtian	Abramychev	Feldman	Kucher	Svitlychna	Cherniak	Naryzhna	Solovyov	Yaroslavskyi	Other	Lead
25 October 2020	Liberty Report/Ukraine 24	12,765	57,9	—	6,2	12,1	12,0	—	4,5	2,4	1,2	1,0	2,7	45,8
Exit polls
20-22 September 2020	Info Sapiens/IRI	600	63	—	—	4	5	13	—	—	—	—	15 (Note: None of the above - 9%)	50
5-11 October 2020	Dialogue	1,600	79,8	—	1,6	7,3	5,3	—	2,3	0,5	0,6	1,2	1,4	72,5
6-11 November 2019	SMC	1,014	56,8	0,5	—	9,1	1,1	15,9	—	—	—	—	16,6	40,9
25 October 2015	2015 Kyiv local election		65,8	4,5		—	—	—		—	—	—	29,7	53,5

== Results ==
=== City Council ===
Graph of the party split among 81 seats.
Party	Votes	%	Seats	+/–
Kernes Bloc — Successful Kharkiv	117,470	37.95	34	New
Opposition Platform — For Life	64,892	20.96	19	New
European Solidarity	27,843	8.99	9	+2
Servant of the People	27,107	8.76	9	New
Party of Shariy	20,266	6.55	7	New
Svitlychna Bloc — Together!	19,016	6.14	6	New
Holos	6,659	2.15	0	New
Our Land	5,936	1.92	0	–7
Batkivshchyna	3,911	1.26	0	New
Democratic Axe	3,647	1.18	0	New
For the Future	2,985	0.96	0	New
Victory of Palchevskyi	2,813	0.91	0	New
Svoboda	2,380	0.77	0	New
Party of Pensioners of Ukraine	2,095	0.68	0	New
Strength and Honor	1,500	0.48	0	New
Aktsent	574	0.19	0	New
Ukrainian Democratic Alliance for Reform	485	0.16	0	New
Total	309,579	100.00	84	0
Valid votes	309,579	95.83		
Invalid/blank votes	13,456	4.17		
Total votes	323,035	100.00		
Registered voters/turnout	1,030,787	31.34		
Source: CEC

=== Mayor ===
Candidate	Party	Votes	%
Hennadiy Kernes	Kernes Bloc — Successful Kharkiv	195,044	61.52
Oleksandr Feldman	Opposition Platform — For Life	46,278	14.60
Oleksiy Kucher	Servant of the People	23,401	7.38
Oleh Abramychev	European Solidarity	21,315	6.72
Ihor Cherniak	Svitlychna Bloc — Together!	10,085	3.18
Oleksandra Naryzhna	Holos	6,282	1.98
Mykyta Soloviov	Democratic Axe	4,199	1.32
Denys Yaroslavskyi	Independent	3,233	1.02
Serhii Kushnariov	Victory of Palchevskyi	2,471	0.78
Ihor Prykhodko	Batkivshchyna	1,888	0.60
Iryna Denysova	For the Future	1,371	0.43
Valerii Bezlepkin	Independent	564	0.18
Nataliia Pylypenko	Independent	558	0.18
Heorhii Lahovskyi	Ukrainian Democratic Alliance for Reform	349	0.11
Total		317,038	100.00
Valid votes		317,038	98.09
Invalid/blank votes		6,180	1.91
Total votes		323,218	100.00
Registered voters/turnout		1,030,787	31.36
Source: CEC

== Aftermath ==
Incumbent mayor and front runner Kernes saw his health rapidly deteriorate in the days before the election and was last seen in public on 23 August 2020. On 17 September 2020 it was announced that Kernes was hospitalized in Germany for COVID-19 and he won the 25 October election from his hospital bed. On 9 December 2020, Kernes was sworn in as mayor without being present and it was announced on 11 December that Kernes had suffered a kidney failure. On 17 December, Kernes' close personal friend, Pavel Fuks, announced that Kernes had died due to complications of COVID-19, exasperated by his kidney failure. Ihor Terekhov would take over the Kernes Block, and a snap election for mayor was scheduled for 2021. Terekhov won these (31 October 2021) election with 50.66% of the vote.
