= Kharkiv City Council =

City council of Kharkiv, Ukraine

Kharkiv City Council Харківська міська рада
- Coat of arms of Kharkiv

Type
- Type: Unicameral

Leadership
- Mayor: Ihor Terekhov, Successful Kharkiv since 11 November 2021
- Secretary: Vacant

Structure
- Seats: 84
- Political groups: Government (34): Kernes Bloc — Successful Kharkiv (34); Supported by (22): Restoration of Ukraine (13) (Note: Formed from former party representatives of Opposition Platform — For Life.); Servant of the People (9); Opposition (21): European Solidarity (9); Svitlychna Bloc — Together! (6); Independent (6) (Note: Opposition Platform — For Life (3); Party of Shariy (3)); Vacant (7): Vacant (7)
- Length of term: 5 years

Elections
- Voting system: Proportional representation
- Last election: 25 October 2020

Meeting place
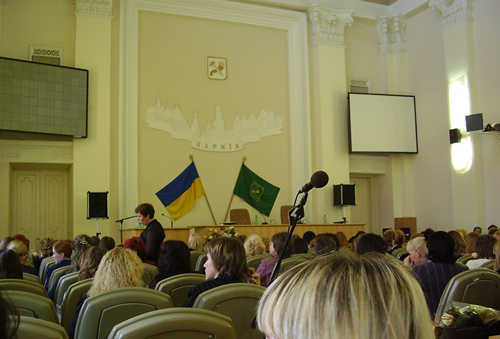
- 7 Constitution Square, Kharkiv, Ukraine

Website
- www.city.kharkiv.ua

Kharkiv City Council (Ukrainian: Харківська міська рада, romanized: Kharkivska miska rada) is the city council for the Ukrainian city of Kharkiv, and is elected every five years to run the city's local government.

== History ==
Until 1870, members of the city council were elected according to the estate order, and later according to property.

=== 20th Century ===
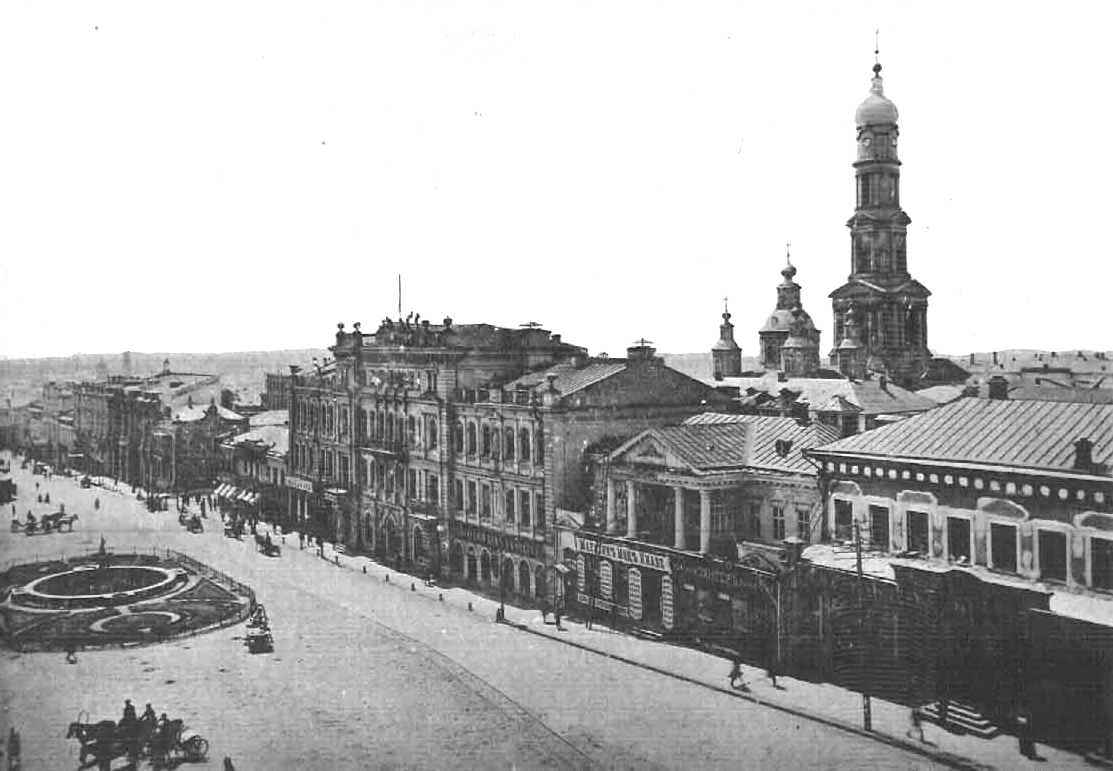
Kharkiv City Duma, 1900

In 1905, workers at the city's enterprises established the first councils. On November 14, 1905, during the 1905 Revolution, members of the united Social Democrats (SD) and later by representatives of the workers at Malyshev Factory and Hammer and Sickle factory established the Kharkov Federal Council, which lasted until January 1906. Initially, the council consisted of 3 people from each of the Social Democratic factions. From November to December 1905, the council published a newspaper called Izvestia Federativnogo Soveta, which ran until the revolution in the city was suppressed.

=== Russian Revolution ===
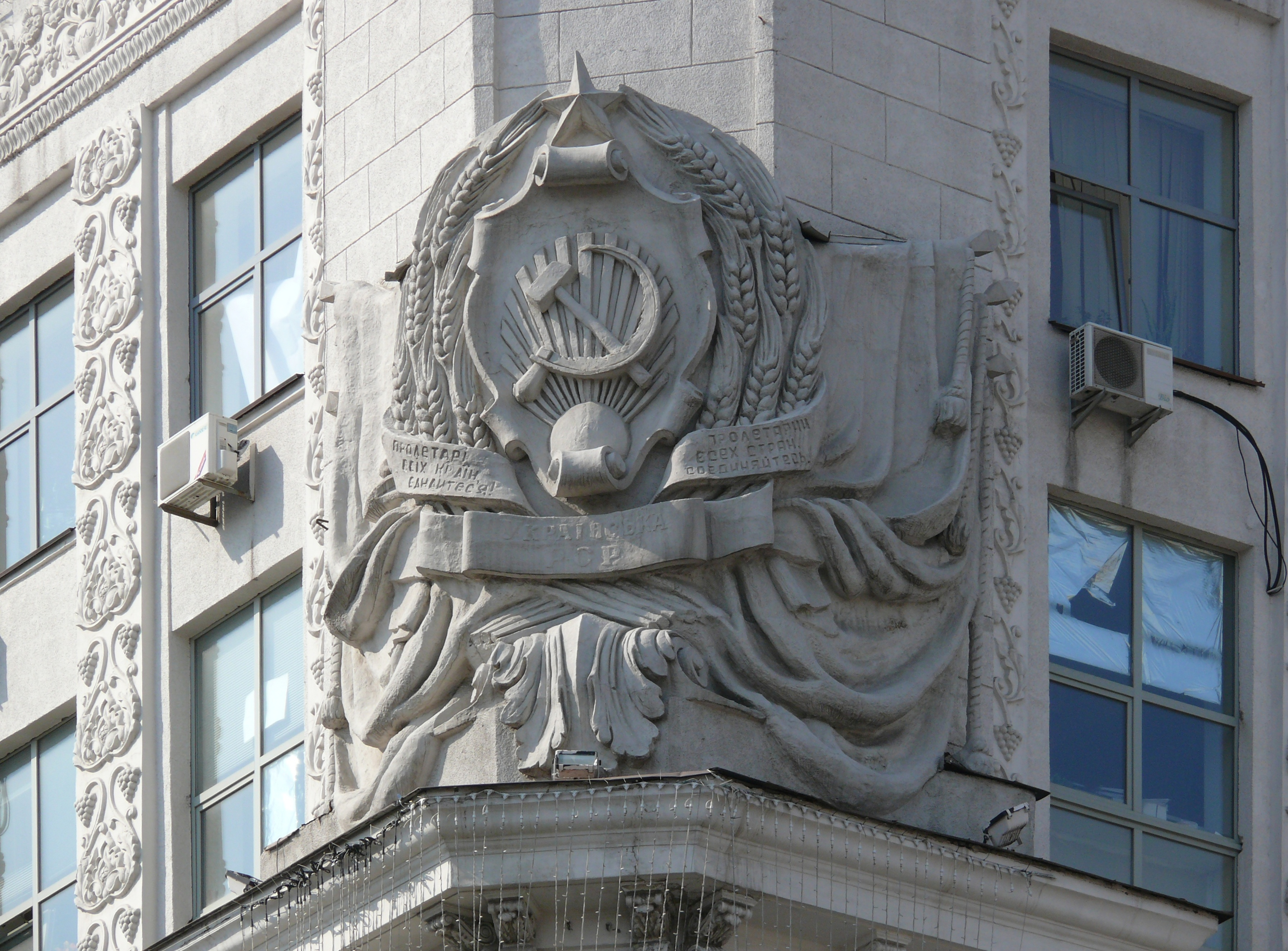
The coat of arms of the Ukrainian SSR on the corner of the Kharkiv City Council building

Following the February Revolution on March 2, 1917, the Kharkov Council of Workers' Deputies was created as an elected local government body. Later on March 8, the Kharkov Council of Soldiers' Deputies was created since WWI was still underway. Both the soldiers and workers councils were then united into the Council of Workers' and Soldiers' Deputies on March 20. Until after the October Revolution, the majority of the Kharkov Council were either Mensheviks or Socialist Revolutionaries. In 1917, the Kharkov Council created a workers' militia, and reforms were introduced. These included disarming the Police Department of Russia, introducing an 8-hour work day at all workplaces, creating a food rationing system, regulating labor relations, and regulating municipal economy and its other functions after the liquidation of the city council. The Kharkov Council of Workers' Deputies remained throughout the Soviet era, where the first chairman was Mikhail Lazko (in 1917), and the last was Yevhen Kushnaryov (in 1990–1991).

In 1917, the council existed for some time under conditions of dual power and tri-power: 1) the Russian Provisional Government (late February - early November); 2) the Provincial Public Committee headed by the Commissar and the Central Rada (April 6 - November 10); 3) the Provincial Ukrainian Rada headed by Mr. Rubas. At the same time, the former Kharkov City Duma also worked in 1917. On April 8, 1918, about the time of the 1918 Ukrainian coup d'état, the authorities of the German Empire abolished the councils that were set up in the city.

=== World War II ===
From October 26, 1941, to April 30, 1943, with a short break in February–March 1943, the city was governed by the Nazi military administration, and Kharkov's city council was responsible for some functions of city government, including collecting taxes, organizing a census, regulating schools and businesses, and deporting certain populations (e.g. Jews) to other areas in Nazi Germany. These were largely headed by the Ober-Burgomaster, under the control of the German military administration. The first Ober-Burgomaster was Wehrmacht Colonel Peters-Knotte (until January 1942), the last was Pavel Kozakevich (until April 30, 1943).

Since the end of August 1943, the Kharkiv City Council has been working in the city without interruption.

=== Independent Ukraine ===
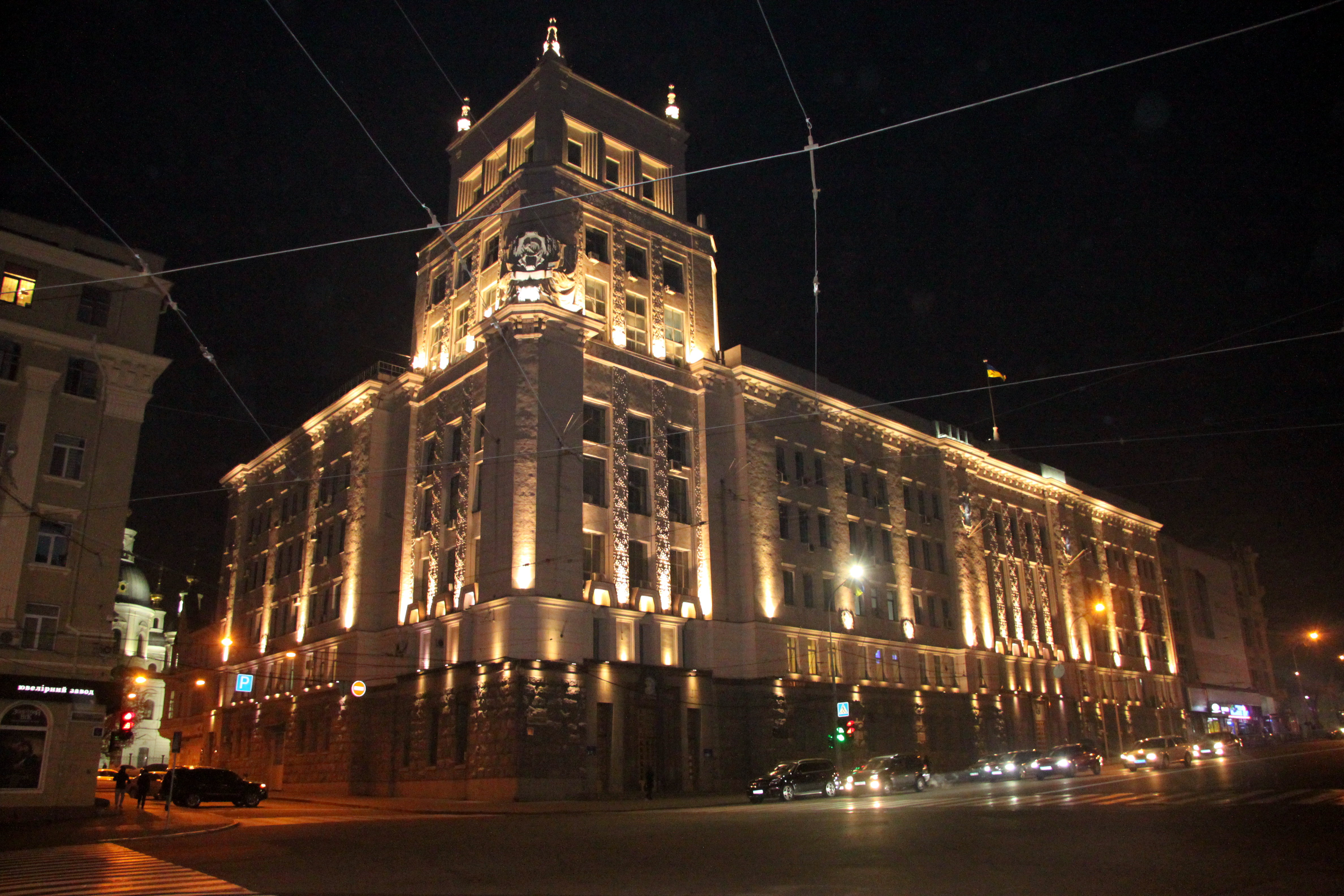
City Council building, Kharkiv, Ukraine

Since Ukrainian independence in 1991, one major point of contention has been the status of the Russian language.

In 1996, the Kharkiv City Council decided to use Russian as a working language along with the state language of Ukrainian. However, the Supreme Court of Ukraine later declared this decision illegal.

In the summer of 2000, the Kharkiv City Council again adopted a decision on the official use of both Russian and Ukrainian in the city's bodies and institutions.

On March 31, 2002, a consultative referendum was held in Kharkiv, where 87% of voters agreed to give Russian official status in the areas that are within the jurisdiction of the Kharkiv City Council.

On March 6, 2006, the Kharkiv City Council decided to recognize Russian as a regional language. Later, a prosecutor appealed this decision to the regional Court of Appeals. On February 6, 2007, the court rejected the prosecutor's appeal, leaving the city council's decision in force.

On July 4, 2007, the Kharkiv City Council enshrined in the city charter the provision that the Russian language is a regional language in the territory of the city of Kharkiv.

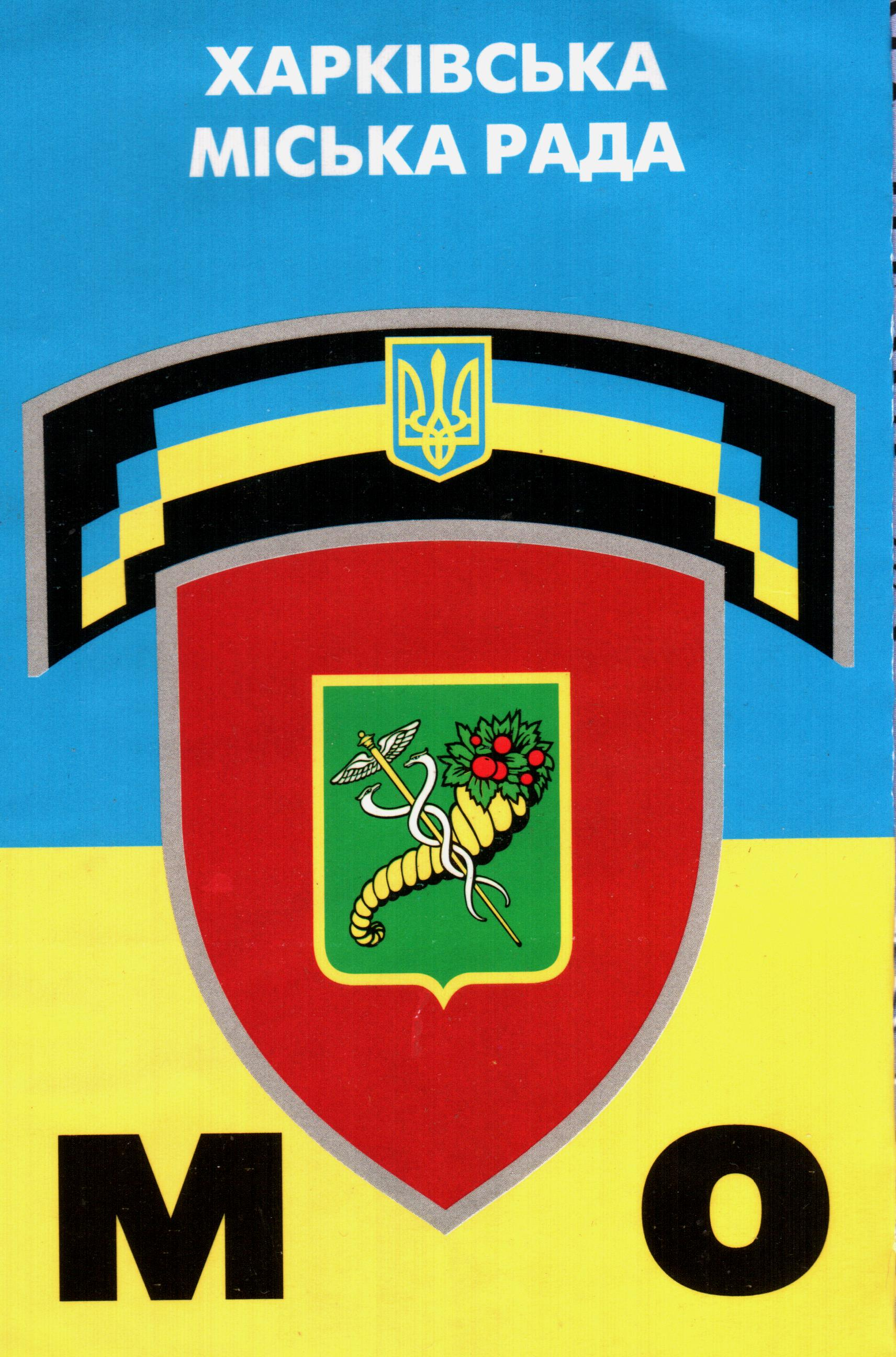
Emblem of the municipal guard of the Kharkiv City Council, 2010

On August 20, 2012, after the Verkhovna Rada (Ukraine's national parliament) adopted a new national language law ("On the Principles of State Language Policy"), the city council approved Russian as the regional language of communication and office work. On the territory of the city of Kharkiv, the following areas were allowed to be conducted in Russian: acts of the city council and its executive bodies, officials; names of state authorities and local governments, associations of citizens, enterprises, institutions and organizations are written, inscriptions on their seals and stamps, official forms and plates; documentation of local referendums; Ukrainian and Russian were used in the work and office work of local governments and in correspondence with higher-level state authorities; texts of official announcements and messages were written in the state language (Ukrainian) and distributed in Russian. On April 25, 2019 the Verkhovna Rada replaced the August 2012 language law with the Law of Ukraine "On protecting the functioning of the Ukrainian language as the state language". In February 2018 the Constitutional Court of Ukraine had ruled the 2012 language law unconstitutional.

Since January 16, 2021, all meetings of the city council, in accordance with the language law on the protection of the Ukrainian language, are held exclusively in Ukrainian.

In 2023, Kharkiv Mayor Ihor Terekhov announced that the Soviet coat of arms on the city council building has been covered up, with plans for removing and replacing it with "Ukrainian symbols", though he has not specified what the new symbol will be or when the work would be completed.

== Structure ==
The Kharkiv City Council of the 8th convocation has the following structure:

- Kharkiv City Council (84 deputies)
- Kharkiv Mayor: Ihor Terekhov
- Secretary of the Kharkiv City Council
- Executive Committee of the Kharkiv City Council
- Deputy Mayors of Kharkiv:
  - First Deputy Mayor
  - Deputy Mayor for Strategic Development of the City
  - Deputy Mayor — Manager of the Executive Committee of the City Council
  - Deputy Mayor — Director of the Department of Housing and Communal Services
  - Deputy Mayor for City Life
  - Deputy Mayor for Digital Transformation
  - Deputy Mayor for Urban Planning and Architecture
  - Deputy Mayor for Family, Youth and Sports
  - Deputy Mayor for Health and Social Protection of the Population
  - Deputy Mayor — Director of the Budget and Finance Department
  - Deputy Mayor — Director of the Department of Economy and Communal Property
  - Deputy Mayor — Director of the Control Department
- City Council and Executive Committee Office:
  - Assistants Service
  - Personnel Management Service
  - Accounting and Reporting Service
  - Corruption Prevention Service
  - Public Procurement Service
  - Organizational Work Department
  - Clerical Department
  - Administrative and Business Activities Department
  - Technical Support Department
  - Archival Department
  - Special Work Department
- Individual departments:
  - Legal Department
  - Department of Municipal Management Development
  - Department of Information and Public Relations
  - Control Department
  - Department of Housing and Communal Services
    - Housing Management
    - Communal Services and Improvement Management
    - Housing Allocation and Accounting Management
  - Department for Cooperation with Law Enforcement Agencies and Civil Protection
    - Civil Protection Management
    - Defense and Mobilization Work Management
  - Department for Urban Life Support
    - Engineering Infrastructure Management
    - Advertising Management
  - Department of International Cooperation
  - Department of Education
  - Department of Culture
  - Department of Administrative Services and Consumer Market
    - Consumer Market Management
    - Entrepreneurship and Regulatory Policy Management
    - Administrative Services Management
  - Department of Construction and Road Facilities
    - Road Facilities Management
    - Economics and Contractual Relations Management
    - Transport and Passenger Transportation Management
  - Department of Registration
  - Department of Digital Transformation
  - Department of Land Relations
  - Department of Inspection Work
    - State Architectural and Construction Control Inspection
    - Improvement Inspection
  - Department of Urban Planning and Architecture
    - Kharkiv Urban Planning Cadastre Service
  - Department for Family, Youth and Sports Affairs
    - Family and Youth Affairs Management
    - Physical Culture and Sports Management
    - Sports Management and Marketing Department
  - Department of Healthcare
  - Department of Social Policy
    - Social Affairs Management
    - Social Monitoring Management
  - Department of Children’s Services
  - Department of Budget and Finance
    - Activity Support and Document Control Management
    - Consolidated Planning Management
    - Revenue and Information Activities Management
    - Social and Cultural Sphere Financing Management
    - Housing and Communal Sphere Financing Management
    - Local Self-Government Bodies Financing Management
    - Finance and Accounting Management
    - District Administrations Financing Management
    - Communications Management
  - Department of Economy and Municipal Property
    - Socio-Economic Development, Planning, and Accounting Management
    - Tariff Policy Management
    - Municipal Property and Privatization Management
  - Department of Emergency Situations
  - Department of Improvement, Reconstruction, and Restoration
  - Department of Inclusive Accessibility and Barrier-Free Environment
  - Department for Veteran Policy
  - Department for Work with Internally Displaced Persons
- District Administrations:
  - Shevchenkivskyi District Administration
  - Kyivskyi District Administration
  - Slobidskyi District Administration
  - Kholodnohirskyi District Administration
  - Saltivskyi District Administration
  - Novobavarskyi District Administration
  - Industrialnyi District Administration
  - Nemyshlianskyi District Administration
  - Osnovianskyi District Administration

== Latest election ==
Results by district

Party	Votes	%	Seats	+/–
Kernes Bloc — Successful Kharkiv	117,470	37.95	34	New
Opposition Platform — For Life	64,892	20.96	19	New
European Solidarity	27,843	8.99	9	+2
Servant of the People	27,107	8.76	9	New
Party of Shariy	20,266	6.55	7	New
Svitlychna Bloc "Together!"	19,016	6.14	6	New
Holos	6,659	2.15	0	New
Our Land	5,936	1.92	0	–7
Batkivshchyna	3,911	1.26	0	New
Democratic Axe	3,647	1.18	0	New
For the Future	2,985	0.96	0	New
Victory of Palchevskyi	2,813	0.91	0	New
Svoboda	2,380	0.77	0	New
Party of Pensioners of Ukraine	2,095	0.68	0	New
Strength and Honor	1,500	0.48	0	New
Aktsent	574	0.19	0	New
Ukrainian Democratic Alliance for Reform	485	0.16	0	New
Total	309,579	100.00	84	0
Valid votes	309,579	95.83		
Invalid/blank votes	13,456	4.17		
Total votes	323,035	100.00		
Registered voters/turnout	1,030,787	31.34		
Source: CEC

== List of elections ==
- 4 March 1990
- 26 June 1994
- 29 March 1998
- 31 March 2002
- 26 March 2006
- 31 October 2010
- 25 October 2015
- 25 October 2020

== List of deputies ==
8th convocation (since 2020)

Member	Faction	Committee
Oleksiy Artykulenko	Successful Kharkiv	Standing Committee on Transport and Communications
Alla Bobeyko	Successful Kharkiv	Standing Committee on Local Self-Government, Transparency and Deputy Activities
Oksana Buhakova	Successful Kharkiv	Standing Committee on Transport and Communications
Oleksandr Vasylenko	Successful Kharkiv	Standing Commission on Urban Planning, Architecture and Land Relations
Olga Velmozhna	Successful Kharkiv	Standing Committee on International Cooperation, Investment, Sports and Image Projects
Alisa Gagarina	Successful Kharkiv	Standing Commission on Ensuring Public Order, Observance of the Law, Protection of Rights, Freedoms and Legitimate Interests of Citizens
Hanna Holovchanska	Successful Kharkiv	Standing Committee on Planning, Budget and Finance
Svitlana Horbunova-Ruban	Successful Kharkiv	Standing Committee on Social Protection and Health Care
Oleksandr Hudymenko	Successful Kharkiv	Standing Committee on Social Protection and Health Care
Evelina Zhuhanets	Successful Kharkiv	Standing Commission on Ensuring Public Order, Observance of the Law, Protection of Rights, Freedoms and Legitimate Interests of Citizens
Volodymyr Zinchenko	Successful Kharkiv	Standing Committee on Industry, Economic Development and Property
Volodymyr Zolotaryov	Successful Kharkiv	Standing Committee on Industry, Economic Development and Property
Vyacheslav Ilyenko	Successful Kharkiv	Standing Committee on Transport and Communications
Nelli Kazanzhieva	Successful Kharkiv	Standing Committee on Planning, Budget and Finance
Oleksandr Kasyanov	Successful Kharkiv	Standing Committee on Industry, Economic Development and Property
Viktoriya Kytayhorodska	Successful Kharkiv	Standing Committee on Environmental Policy
Svitlana Kyrychenko	Successful Kharkiv	Standing Commission on Humanitarian Issues (Education, Culture, Spirituality, Youth Policy and Sports)
Volodymyr Kotkovsky	Successful Kharkiv	Standing Committee on Planning, Budget and Finance
Vasyl Kuhar	Successful Kharkiv	Standing Commission on Ensuring Public Order, Observance of the Law, Protection of Rights, Freedoms and Legitimate Interests of Citizens
Oleksandr Lobanovskyi	Successful Kharkiv	Standing Commission on Urban Planning, Architecture and Land Relations
Yuriy Medvedyev	Successful Kharkiv	Standing Commission on Urban Planning, Architecture and Land Relations
Tetyana Myronenko	Successful Kharkiv	Standing Commission on Humanitarian Issues (Education, Culture, Spirituality, Youth Policy and Sports)
Habriel Mykhaylov	Successful Kharkiv	Standing Commission on Urban Planning, Architecture and Land Relations
Oleh Murashov	Successful Kharkiv	Standing Committee on Environmental Policy
Roman Nekhoroshkov	Successful Kharkiv	Standing Commission on Housing and Communal Services, City Improvement and Engineering Infrastructure
Oleksandr Novak	Successful Kharkiv	Standing Committee on Planning, Budget and Finance
Oksana Ostrohlyad	Successful Kharkiv	Standing Commission on Housing and Communal Services, City Improvement and Engineering Infrastructure
Nataliya Pohoryelova	Successful Kharkiv	Standing Commission on Humanitarian Issues (Education, Culture, Spirituality, Youth Policy and Sports)
Tetyana Pozdyeyeva	Successful Kharkiv	Standing Commission on Housing and Communal Services, City Improvement and Engineering Infrastructure
Tymofyeyeva Nadiya	Successful Kharkiv	Standing Commission on Humanitarian Issues (Education, Culture, Spirituality, Youth Policy and Sports)
Oleh Tovkun	Successful Kharkiv	Standing Committee on International Cooperation, Investment, Sports and Image Projects
Oleksiy Topchiy	Successful Kharkiv	Standing Committee on Transport and Communications
Volodymyr Tupitsyn	Successful Kharkiv	Standing Committee on Planning, Budget and Finance
Tetyana Tsybulnyk	Successful Kharkiv	Standing Committee on Local Self-Government, Transparency and Deputy Activities
Yevheniy Andriychuk	Restoration of Ukraine	Standing Committee on Transport and Communications
Anastasiya Hubina	Restoration of Ukraine	Standing Committee on Transport and Communications
Serhiy Danylo	Restoration of Ukraine	Standing Committee on Industry, Economic Development and Property
Vitaliy Kyrylenko	Restoration of Ukraine	Standing Commission on Humanitarian Issues (Education, Culture, Spirituality, Youth Policy and Sports)
Viktor Larchenko	Restoration of Ukraine	Standing Committee on Planning, Budget and Finance
Ihor Ovechkin	Restoration of Ukraine	Standing Commission on Urban Planning, Architecture and Land Relations
Ihor Polupanov	Restoration of Ukraine	Standing Committee on Planning, Budget and Finance
Said Javid	Restoration of Ukraine	Standing Committee on Social Protection and Health Care
Andriy Spasskyi	Restoration of Ukraine	Standing Commission on Ensuring Public Order, Observance of the Law, Protection of Rights, Freedoms and Legitimate Interests of Citizens
Eduard Tychkov	Restoration of Ukraine	Standing Commission on Urban Planning, Architecture and Land Relations
Viktor Fesun	Restoration of Ukraine	Standing Commission on Housing and Communal Services, City Improvement and Engineering Infrastructure
Dmytro Khivrenko	Restoration of Ukraine	Standing Committee on Local Self-Government, Transparency and Deputy Activities
Ihor Shram	Restoration of Ukraine	Standing Commission on Housing and Communal Services, City Improvement and Engineering Infrastructure
Oleh Abramichev	European Solidarity	Standing Commission on Humanitarian Issues (Education, Culture, Spirituality, Youth Policy and Sports)
Ruslan Ahibalov	European Solidarity	Standing Committee on Local Self-Government, Transparency and Deputy Activities
Iryna Honcharova	European Solidarity	Standing Committee on Environmental Policy
Andrii Ivanov	European Solidarity	Standing Committee on Industry, Economic Development and Property
Ihor Isayenko	European Solidarity	Standing Committee on Social Protection and Health Care
Kateryna Malbiyeva	European Solidarity	Standing Committee on International Cooperation, Investment, Sports and Image Projects
Ihor Pushkarov	European Solidarity	Standing Commission on Ensuring Public Order, Observance of the Law, Protection of Rights, Freedoms and Legitimate Interests of Citizens
Artem Revchuk	European Solidarity	Standing Commission on Housing and Communal Services, City Improvement and Engineering Infrastructure
Bohdan Tkachuk	European Solidarity	Standing Commission on Urban Planning, Architecture and Land Relations
Alyeksyeychuk Viktoriya	Servant of the People	Standing Committee on Local Self-Government, Transparency and Deputy Activities
Maksym Bondarenko	Servant of the People	Standing Committee on Social Protection and Health Care
Dmytro Butenko	Servant of the People	Standing Commission on Ensuring Public Order, Observance of the Law, Protection of Rights, Freedoms and Legitimate Interests of Citizens
Oleksandr Venglinsky	Servant of the People	Standing Committee on Industry, Economic Development and Property
Oleksandr Kotukov	Servant of the People	Standing Committee on International Cooperation, Investment, Sports and Image Projects
Anzhelika Krutova	Servant of the People	Standing Committee on Planning, Budget and Finance
Alina Mustafayeva	Servant of the People	Standing Committee on Social Protection and Health Care
Eduard Pavlenko	Servant of the People	Standing Committee on Environmental Policy
Anastasiya Fedoryk	Servant of the People	Standing Committee on Industry, Economic Development and Property
Oleksandr Abramov	Svitlychna Bloc — Together!	Standing Committee on Social Protection and Health Care
Anatoliy Babichev	Svitlychna Bloc — Together!	Standing Commission on Humanitarian Issues (Education, Culture, Spirituality, Youth Policy and Sports)
Dmytro Bulakh	Svitlychna Bloc — Together!	Standing Commission on Housing and Communal Services, City Improvement and Engineering Infrastructure
Maksym Radchenko	Svitlychna Bloc — Together!	Standing Committee on Local Self-Government, Transparency and Deputy Activities
Ihor Chernyak	Svitlychna Bloc — Together!	Standing Commission on Urban Planning, Architecture and Land Relations
Tetyana Shtal	Svitlychna Bloc — Together!	Standing Committee on Planning, Budget and Finance
Andriy Lesyk	Independent	Standing Committee on International Cooperation, Investment, Sports and Image Projects
Davito Matveychenko	Independent	Standing Committee on Transport and Communications
Serhiy Nasinnik	Independent	Standing Committee on Environmental Policy
Volodymyr Pletnev	Independent	Standing Commission on Ensuring Public Order, Observance of the Law, Protection of Rights, Freedoms and Legitimate Interests of Citizens
Anatoliy Rodzynskyy	Independent	Standing Committee on International Cooperation, Investment, Sports and Image Projects
Mykyta Rozhenko	Independent	Standing Committee on International Cooperation, Investment, Sports and Image Projects
Serhiy Syrota	Independent	Standing Committee on Environmental Policy
Serhiy Tereshchuk	Independent	Standing Committee on Local Self-Government, Transparency and Deputy Activities

== See also ==
- List of mayors of Kharkiv
- Kharkiv Oblast Council
