= Frunzensky District =

Frunzensky District may refer to:

- Frunzensky District, Russia, name of several districts and city districts in Russia
- Nemyshlyanskyi District, formerly Frunzensky District, a city district of Kharkiv, Ukraine
- Frunzenski District, a city district of Minsk, Belarus
- Frunze District, former name of Medeu District, Almaty

== See also ==
- Frunzensky (disambiguation)
- Frunze (disambiguation)
