= Frunzensky District, Russia =

Frunzensky District is the name of several administrative and municipal districts in Russia. The districts are generally named for Mikhail Frunze, a Bolshevik leader.

Location of St. Petersburg in Russia

== Districts of the federal subjects ==
- Frunzensky District, Saint Petersburg, an administrative district of the federal city of Saint Petersburg

== City divisions ==
- Frunzensky City District, Ivanovo, a city district of Ivanovo, the administrative center of Ivanovo Oblast
- Frunzensky City District, Saratov, a city district of Saratov, the administrative center of Saratov Oblast
- Frunzensky City District, Vladimir, a city district of Vladimir, the administrative center of Vladimir Oblast
- Frunzensky City District, Vladivostok, a city district of Vladivostok, the administrative center of Primorsky Krai
- Frunzensky City District, Yaroslavl, a city district of Yaroslavl, the administrative center of Yaroslavl Oblast
Cities in Russia with a city division called "Frunzensky"

== See also ==
- Frunzensky (disambiguation)
- Frunze (disambiguation)
