= Frunze =

Frunze may refer to:

== Places ==
- The old name for Bishkek, the capital city of Kyrgyzstan
- Frunze, Osh, a village in Nookat District, Osh Region, Kyrgyzstan
- Frunze, Chuy, a village in Sokuluk District, Chuy Region, Kyrgyzstan
- Frunze, Russia, several rural localities in Russia
- Frunze, Tajikistan, a town in Sughd Province, Tajikistan
- Frunze, former name of Hacırüstəmli, a village in Imishli District, Azerbaijan
- Frunze, former name of Tuganbay, a village in Almaty Province, Kazakhstan
- Frunze, former name of Kadamjay, a town in Batken Region, Kyrgyzstan
- Frunze, former name of Sabriston, a town in Sughd Region, Tajikistan
- Frunze, former name of Sentianivka, a town in Luhansk Oblast, Ukraine

== People ==
- Frunze Dovlatyan (1927–1997), Armenian film director and actor
- Mikhail Frunze (1885–1925), Russian Bolshevik leader

== Other ==
- Frunze Airport, former name of the Manas International Airport, Kyrgyzstan
- Frunze Military Academy, in Moscow, active between 1918 and 1998
- M.V. Frunze Naval School, former name of the St. Petersburg Naval Institute, Saint Petersburg
- Soviet ship Frunze, several ships of the Soviet/Russian Navy named for Mikhail Frunze

== See also ==
- Frunzensky (disambiguation)
- Imeni Frunze, several rural localities in Russia
- Frunză (disambiguation), several places in Moldova
- Frunzeni (disambiguation), several places in Romania
