= Zhovtnevyi Raion (disambiguation) =

Zhovtnevyi Raion (Ukrainian: Жовтневий район) is a common Soviet Ukrainian name for raions (districts) in a number of cities across Ukraine as well as a subdivision of Mykolaiv Oblast. The name is dedicated to the October Revolution.

== Existing ==
- Zhovtnevyi Raion, Luhansk

== Former ==
- Zhovtnevyi Raion, Kiev
- Zhovtnevyi Raion, Odesa Oblast, in Odesa Oblast (1923–59)
- Zhovtnevyi Raion, Dnipropetrovsk
- Zhovtnevyi Raion, Zaporizhzhia
- Zhovtnevyi Raion, Kryvyi Rih
- Zhovtnevyi Raion, Mariupol
- Zhovtnevyi Raion, Kharkiv
- Vitovka Raion, until 2016 Zhovtneve Raion, in Mykolaiv Oblast
