= Frunzeni =

Frunzeni may refer to:

- Frunzeni, a village in Lunca, Mureș
- Frunzeni, a village in Costișa Commune, Neamţ County, Romania

== See also ==
- Frunză (disambiguation)
- Frunzeni (disambiguation)
