= Osnovianskyi District =

Coordinates: 49°58′59″N 36°13′59″E

Osnovianskyi District Основ'янський район
- Urban district in Kharkiv
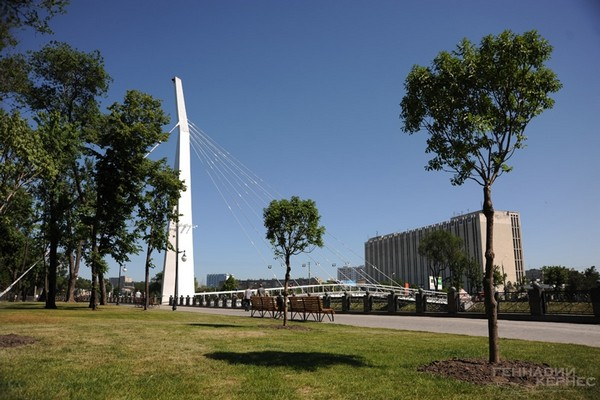
- Pedestrian suspension bridge in Strelka Park

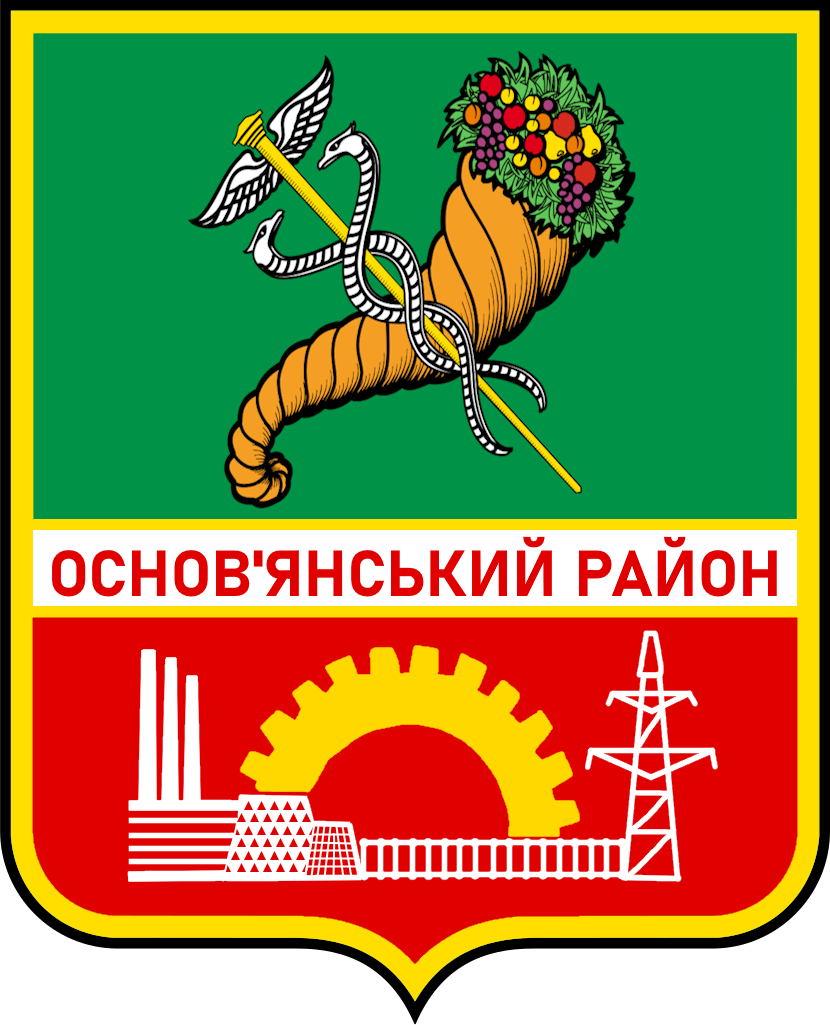
- Seal
- Interactive map of Osnovianskyi District
- Country: Ukraine
- Oblast: Kharkiv Oblast
- City: Kharkiv

Government
  - Head of Administration: Hanna Holovchanska (Kernes Bloc — Successful Kharkiv)

Area
  - Total: 45.54 km^{2} (17.58 sq mi)

Population
  - Total: 93,000
- Time zone: UTC+2 (EET)
  - Summer (DST): UTC+3 (EEST)

1. Kholodnohirskyi District; 2. Shevchenkivskyi District; 3. Kyivskyi District; 4. Saltivskyi District; 5. Nemyshlianskyi District; 6. Industrialnyi District; 7. Slobidskyi District; 8. Osnovianskyi District; 9. Novobavarskyi District

Osnovianskyi District (Ukrainian: Основ'янський район) is an urban district of the city of Kharkiv, Ukraine, named after a neighborhood in the city Osnova.

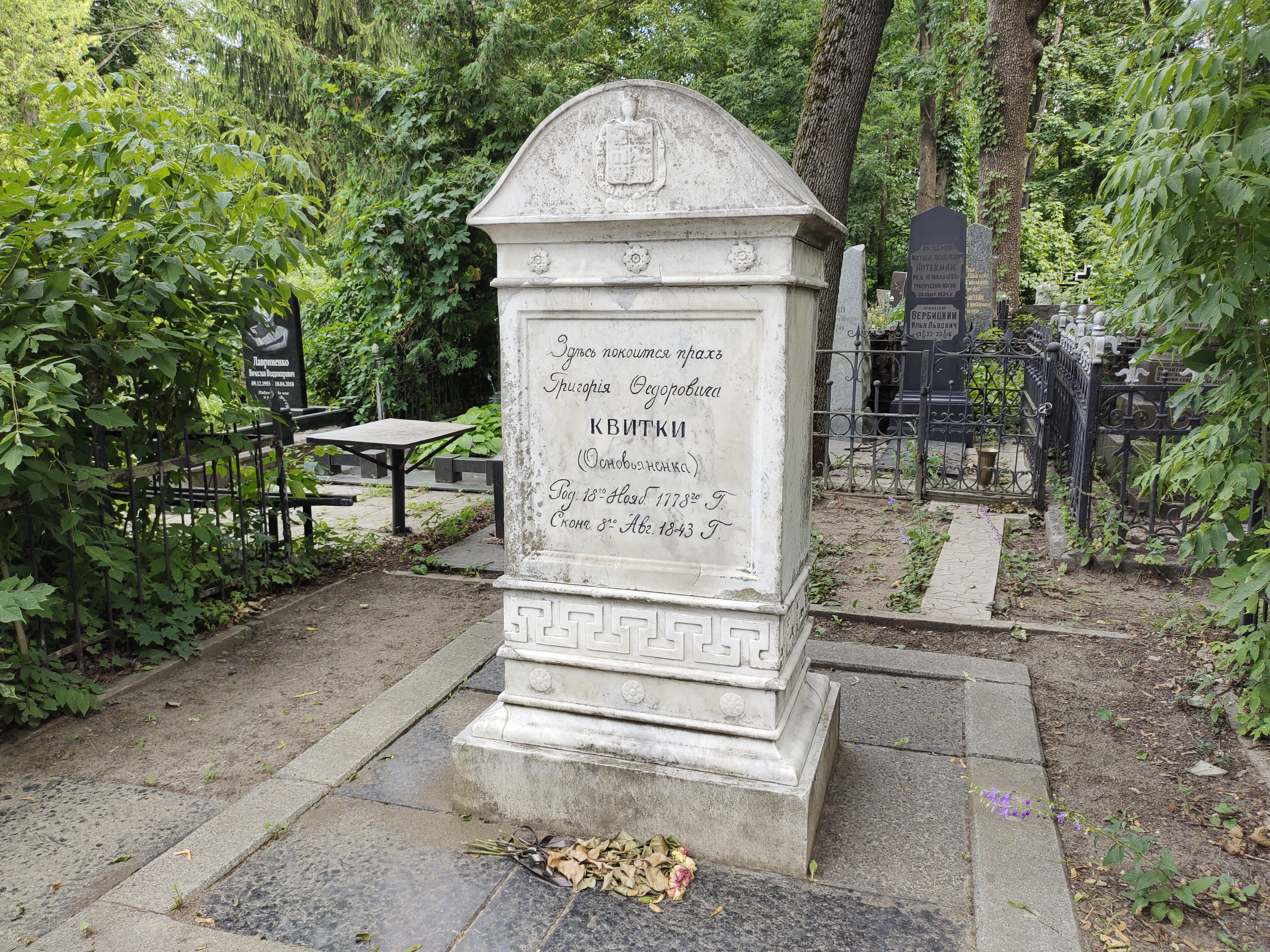
Grave of Hryhorii Kvitka-Osnovianenko on the Second City Cemetery in Kharkiv

The district was established in January 1919 as Petynsko-Zhuravlivskyi. In September 1924, it was renamed Chervonozavodskyi. In 2016, it was renamed to its current name to comply with decommunization laws.

== Industry and trade ==
There are 68 industrial and 11 transport enterprises, 23 construction organizations operating in the district.

There is a developed network of trade and catering enterprises in the district, which includes more than 300 shops, 2 shopping areas, 2 shopping complexes, 115 catering enterprises, 14 summer areas with cafes, 187 kiosks. There are 192 enterprises in the field of household services.

== Education and science ==
More than 6,000 students study in 9 higher educational institutions, 2 of which have the III level of accreditation. 6,460 students are educated in 8 secondary schools and 2 gymnasiums. There are 17 preschool educational institutions in the district.

There are 15 research institutes and design bureaus operating in the district.

== Culture ==
About 3,000 pupils attend 2 schools of aesthetic education and a children's and youth sports school. More than 700 children and teenagers are engaged in groups and sections of 12 clubs by place of residence.

To meet the cultural needs of the population, the district Palace and House of Culture, the Center for Children's and Youth Creativity work.

In the district there is a Central Library of the Osnovianskyi district, which manages the district's centralized library system, which includes 8 libraries.

== Notable people ==
The former village of Osnova, which gave its name to the district, is known as the birthplace of Ukrainian classical writer Hryhorii Kvitka-Osnovianenko.
