= Industrialnyi District, Kharkiv =

Coordinates: 49°57′00″N 36°22′00″E

Industrialnyi District Індустріальний район
- Urban district in Kharkiv
- Interactive map of Industrialnyi District
- Country: Ukraine
- Oblast: Kharkiv Oblast

Government
  - Head of Administration: Olga Velmozhna (Kernes Bloc — Successful Kharkiv)

Area
  - Total: 33.4 km^{2} (12.9 sq mi)

Population
  - Total: 157,900
- Time zone: UTC+2 (EET)
  - Summer (DST): UTC+3 (EEST)

1. Kholodnohirskyi District; 2. Shevchenkivskyi District; 3. Kyivskyi District; 4. Saltivskyi District; 5. Nemyshlianskyi District; 6. Industrialnyi District; 7. Slobidskyi District; 8. Osnovianskyi District; 9. Novobavarskyi District

Industrialnyi District (Ukrainian: Індустріальний район) is an urban district of the city of Kharkiv, Ukraine, named after its industrial hub built in 1930s at its city's eastern outskirts.

It was originally developed as a "socialist city" (sotsgorod) to house the workers of the newly built Kharkiv Tractor Plant (KhTZ). In 1936 the district was named Ordzhonikidzevskyi after Sergo Ordzhonikidze, Stalin's commissar for heavy industry.

On 24 October 1941, after a four-day battle, Kharkiv and the district was occupied by German forces. In advance of the Germans, most of the industrial plant, including the KhTZ, had been dismantled and moved east or rendered inoperative. On 14 December, the German Stadtkommandant ordered the Jewish population to be concentrated in a hut settlement near the KhTZ. In two days, 20,000 Jews were gathered there. Those an SS Sonderkommando did not shoot were killed throughout January in a gas van. The district and the city were liberated by Soviet forces in February 1943. The district was liberated again, following a German counteroffensive in March, in August 1943.

In February 2016 the district was renamed, Ordzhonikidzevskyi becoming the Industrialnyi District to comply with decommunization laws. The popular name for neighbourhood was, and has remained, "KhTZ", with a reputation of being the more socially deprived areas of the Kharkiv.

According to a February 28, 2022, report from Agroportal24h, the Kharkiv Tractor Plant was destroyed and "engulfed in fire" by "massive shelling" from Russian forces. There is video purporting to record explosions and fire at the plant on 25 and 27 February 2022.

On 4 March 2022, Human Rights Watch reported that on the fourth day of the invasion of Ukraine by the Russian Federation, 28 February 2022, Federation forces used cluster munitions in this, and two other districts, of Kharkiv. The rights group—which noted the "inherently indiscriminate nature of cluster munitions and their foreseeable effects on civilians"—based its assessment on interviews and an analyses of 40 videos and photographs.

== Industry and trade ==
Today, the district is represented by 29 industrial enterprises, 7 — construction, 5 — transport. The basis of industrial production consists of:

- production of agricultural machinery (JSC "HTZ");
- production of electrotechnical machines, equipment, apparatus and products of industrial purpose (SE "Electrovajmash");
- production of bearings (JSC "KHARP");
- production of metal cutting machines (JSC "Harverst");
- production of building materials (JSC "Kharkivskyi Tile Plant", SE "Experimental Cement Plant")
- processing industry (Kharkiv branch of OJSC "SAN InBev Ukraine", ATVT "Kharkiv dairy plant", SUB LLC "Ahmad-T", LLC "East Ukrainian company "Maltyrop", PF "GALS").

The Rohan industrial complex includes:

- dairy plant (ATVT "KHMK");
- Brewery "Rogan" (Kharkiv branch of OJSC "SAN InBev Ukraine");
- tea packing factory SUB "Ahmad-Ti" LLC
- PF "GALS".

There are 400 shops, 67 catering enterprises, 147 household service enterprises, 20 supermarkets, 6 shopping centers and 7 markets operating in the district.

== Education and science ==
On the territory of the district are located:

- 1 higher educational institution, college, vocational and technical education center;
- 26 schools, 20 children's preschool institutions. In May 2024 an underground school was opened so children could continue their education amidst the missile strikes in Kharkiv by the Russian Armed Forces during the Russian invasion of Ukraine. The school has 20 classrooms and can host 900 students who study in two shifts. This was the first of other underground school opened in the city.

== Culture ==
On the territory of the district are located:

- 2 music schools and 1 library with 7 branches;
- parks of culture and recreation: "Green Grove" and named after Mayakovsky;
- Church of the Holy Martyr Alexander Archbishop of Kharkiv;
- Palace of Culture of OJSC "KHTZ", Palace of Culture of Children of OJSC "KHTZ", Palace of Schoolchildren and Youth "Dzherelo".

== Health care ==
There are 6 medical institutions located on the territory of the district, including city polyclinic No. 9 — the only "family doctor" polyclinic in the city.

== Sport ==
On the territory of the Industrial District there are the stadium "East", the Palace of Sports "Zmina", children's and youth sports school No. 11, the city complex children's and youth sports school, children's and youth sports school "East", the city center of physical health of the population "Sports for all".

== Places ==
- KhTZ
- Chunykhy
- Obriy
- micro-districts: 759

== Gallery ==
State factory "Elektrovazhmash"

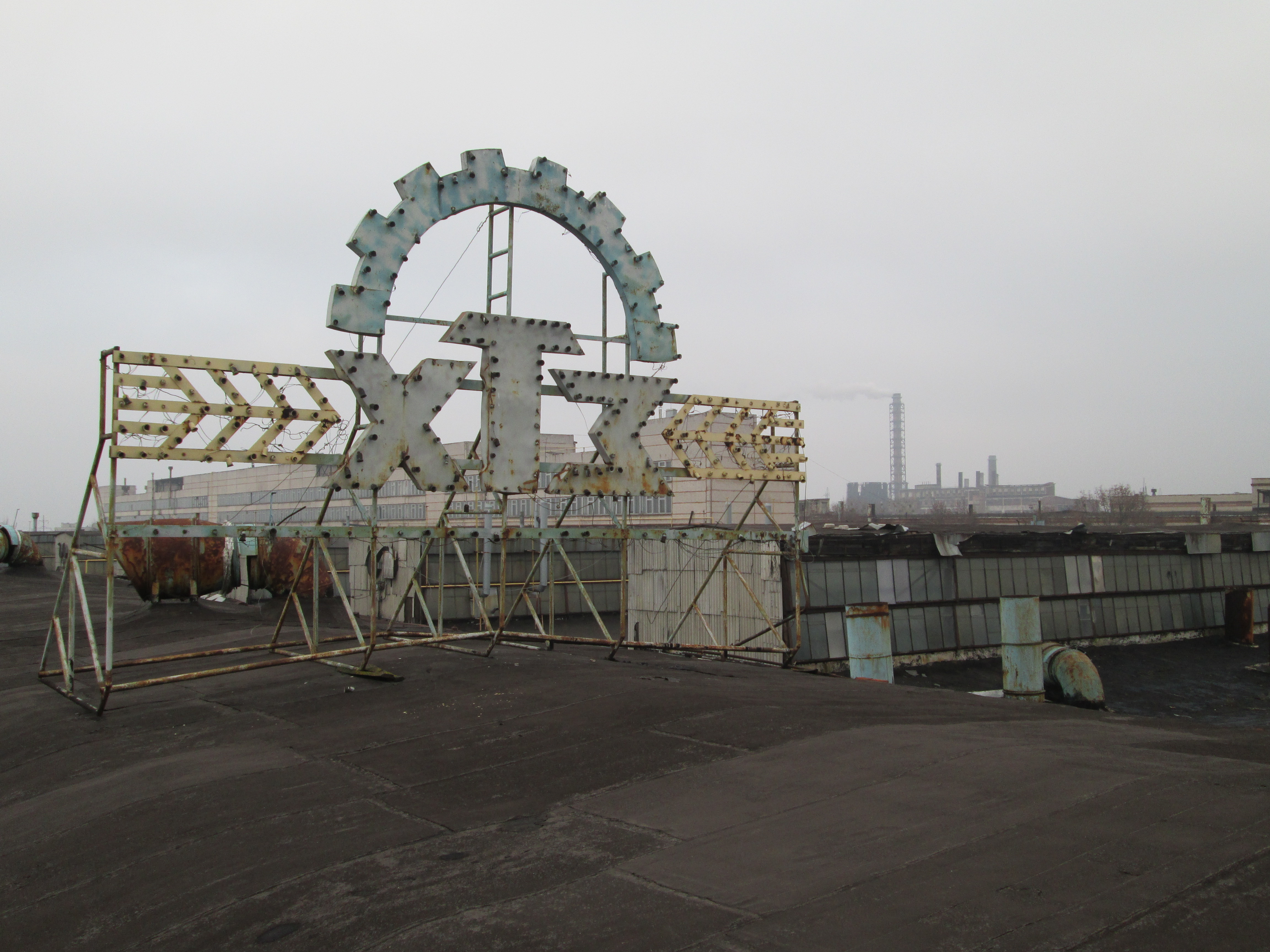
KhTZ (Kharkiv Tractor Plant)

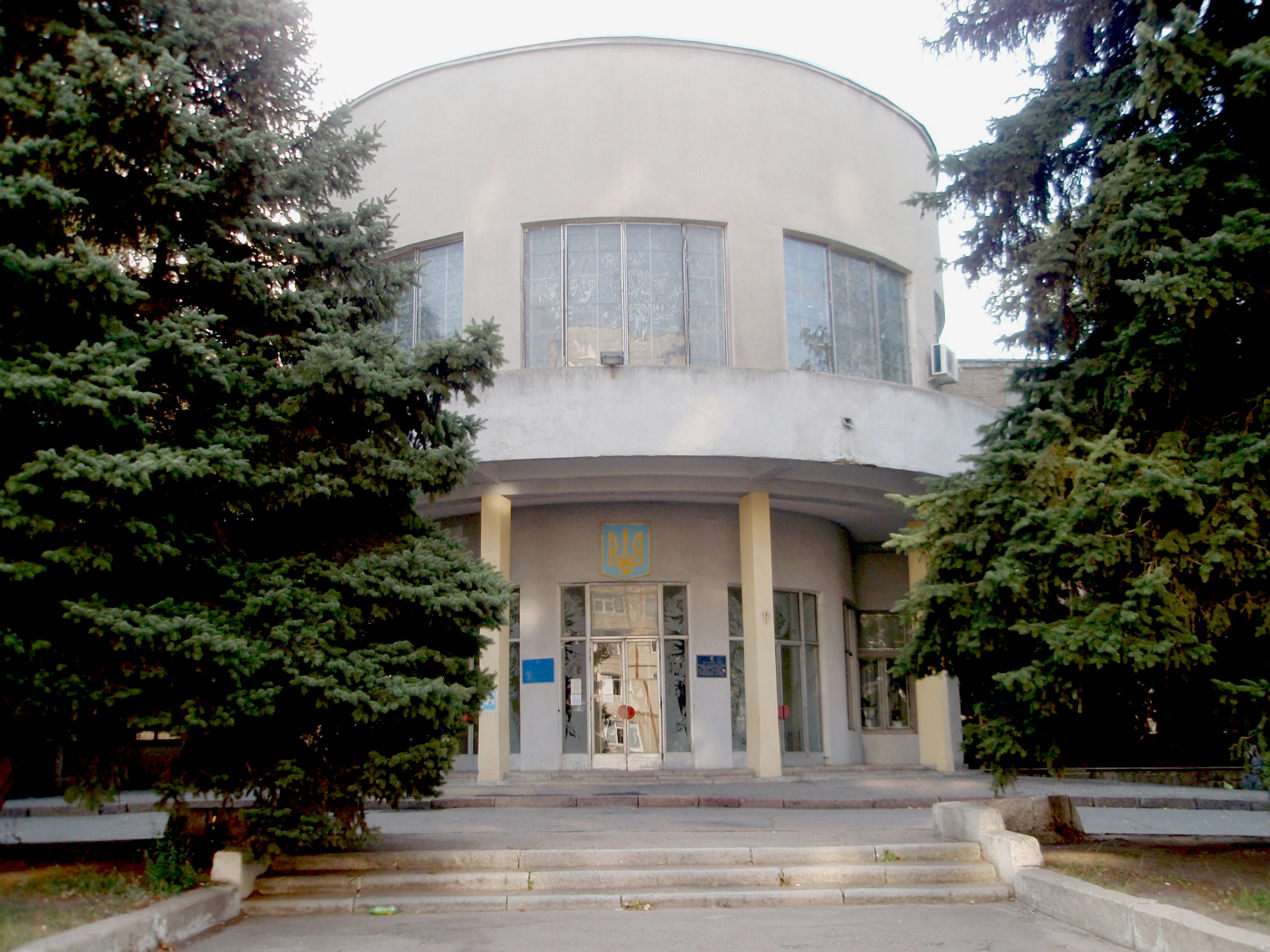
Palace of newlyborn and newlywed
