= Shevchenkivskyi District, Kharkiv =

Coordinates: 50°01′N 36°13′E

Shevchenkivskyi District Шевченківський район
- Urban district in Kharkiv
- Interactive map of Shevchenkivskyi District
- Country: Ukraine
- Oblast: Kharkiv Oblast

Government
  - Head of Administration: Volodymyr Kotkovsky (Kernes Bloc — Successful Kharkiv)

Area
  - Total: 62 km^{2} (24 sq mi)

Population
  - Total: 231,641
- Time zone: UTC+2 (EET)
  - Summer (DST): UTC+3 (EEST)

| 1. Kholodnohirskyi District; 2. Shevchenkivskyi District; 3. Kyivskyi District; 4. Saltivskyi District; 5. Nemyshlianskyi District; 6. Industrialnyi District; 7. Slobidskyi District; 8. Osnovianskyi District; 9. Novobavarskyi District |

Shevchenkivskyi District (Ukrainian: Шевченківський район) is an urban district of the city of Kharkiv, Ukraine, named after the Ukrainian poet Taras Shevchenko.

The district was created in 1932 out of parts of Ivano-Lysohirskyi and Petynsko-Zhuravlivskyi districts. It was named as Dzerzhynskyi after the communist mass murderer Felix Dzerzhinsky, head of Cheka (All-Russian Extraordinary Commission). It was renamed to its current name in February 2016 to comply with decommunization laws.

== Industry and trade ==
The following industrial enterprises operate in the district: DPU "Kharkivgazvydobuvannya", CJSC "Biolik", SE "Zavod chemical reagents", NTK "Institute of Monocrystals", CJSC "Food Acid Plant", JSC "Kharkivsky Zavod Metalist", JSC "Tochprilad", etc. .

As of July 1, 2005, there were 26,859 subjects of business activity, including 11,488 legal entities and 15,371 individuals, registered with the State Tax Inspectorate in the Dzerzhinsky district.

As of July 1, 2006, the consumer market of the district included 683 trade enterprises. There are 9 markets and trading platforms, 541 public catering enterprises, and 498 household service enterprises operating in the district.

== Education and science ==
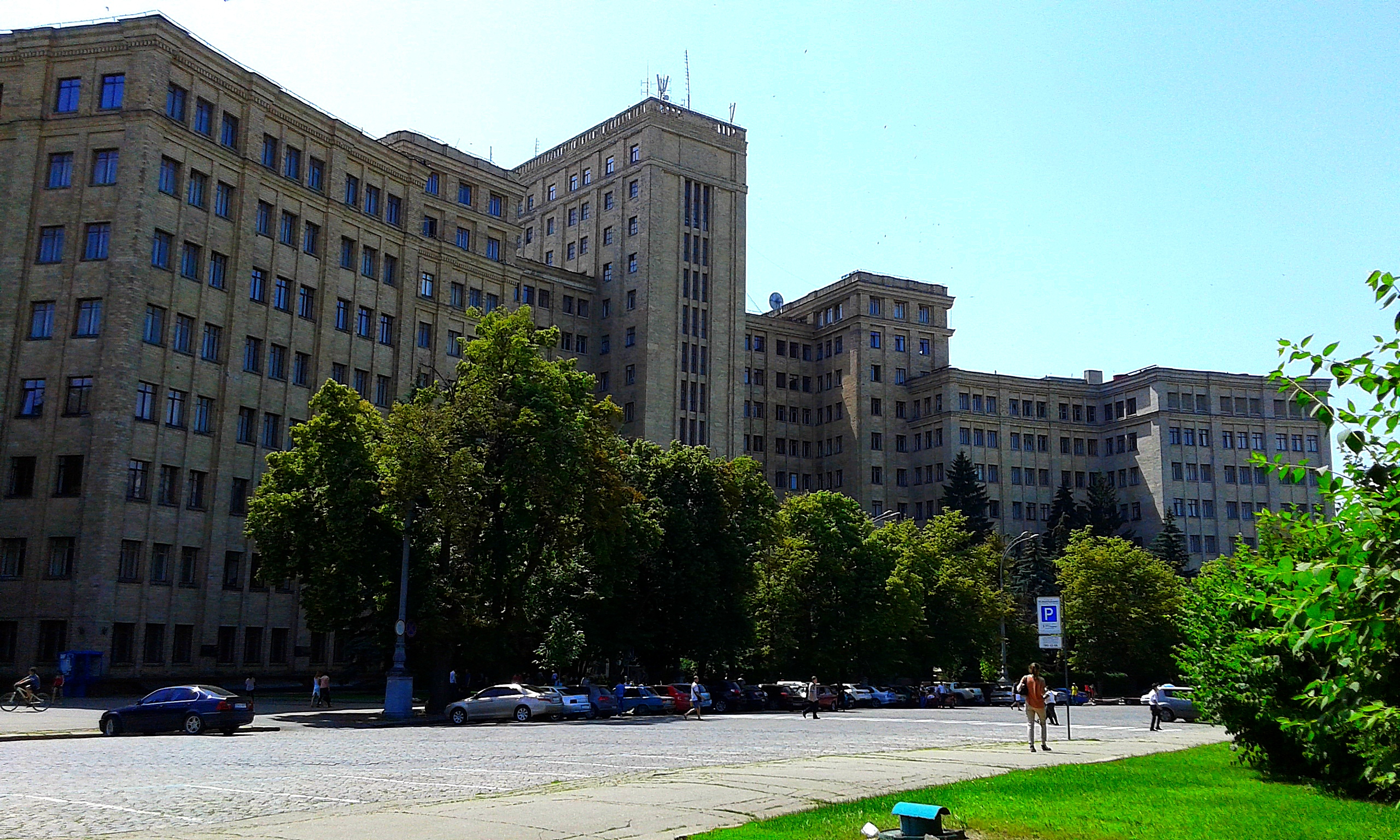
Central building of National University of Kharkiv

There are 18 higher educational institutions in the district, where 67.5 thousand students study. On the territory of the district are located: National University of Kharkiv, Kharkiv National Medical University, Kharkiv National University of Radioelectronics, Kharkiv National University of Economics, etc.

There are 33 secondary educational institutions, including two private and one evening school. A total of 18,865 students study in educational institutions. There are 24 children's preschools, which are attended by 3,783 children, 3 out-of-school institutions and the NVK. The number of their pupils is 9,247.

52 scientific and technical institutions are registered on the territory of Shevchenkiv district. Among them are the Scientific and Technological Complex "Institute of Single Crystals" of the National Academy of Sciences of Ukraine, the Verkin Institute for Low Temperature Physics and Engineering, UkrDNTC "Energostal", JSC "Vazhpromavtomatika", JSC "Vazpromelektroproekt", Ukrainian Research Institute of Environmental problems etc.

== Culture ==
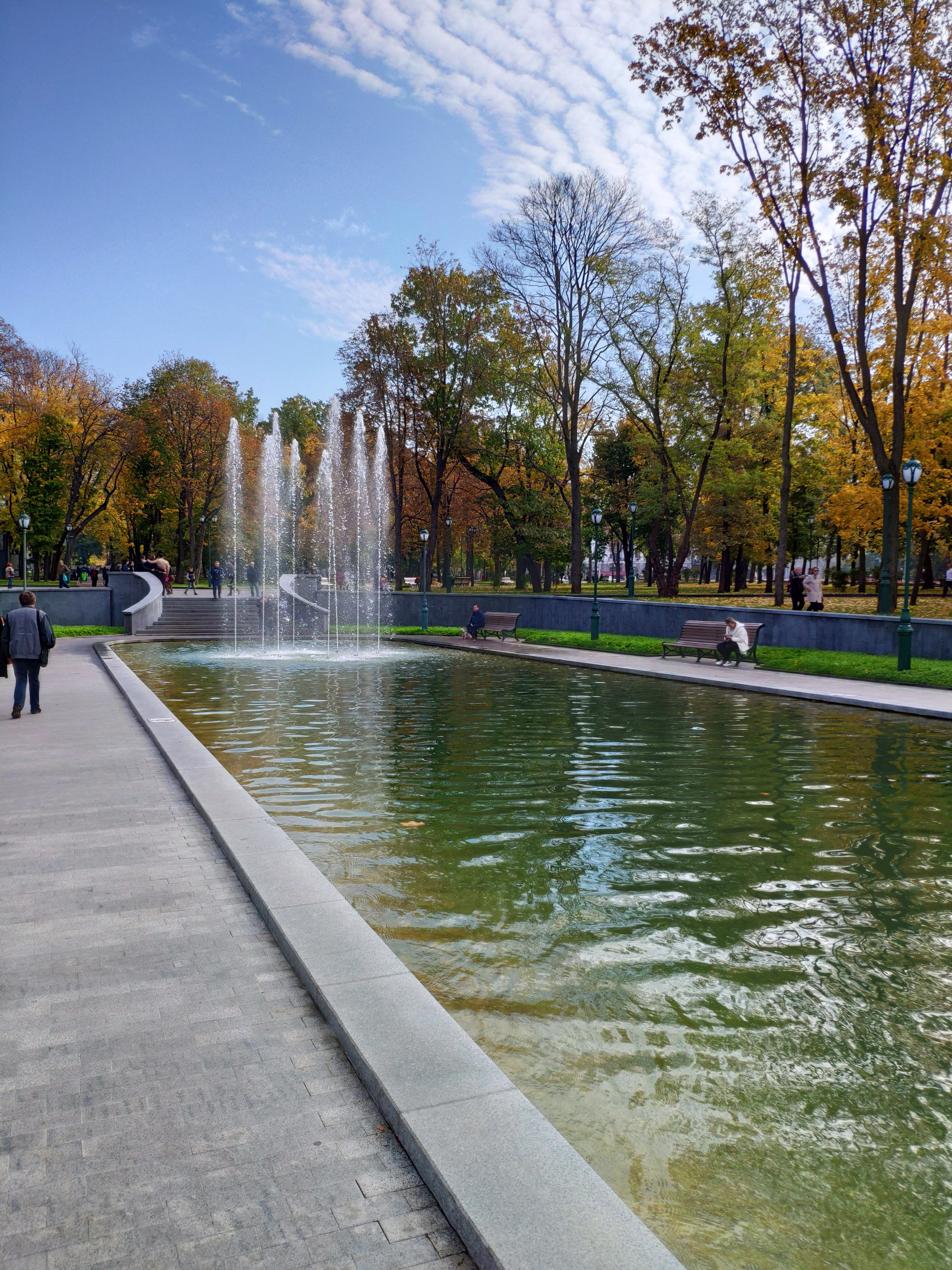
City Garden named after Shevchenko

On the territory of the district are located:

- Kharkiv State Academic Theater of Opera and Ballet named after Lysenko;
- Kharkiv State Academic Ukrainian Drama Theater named after Shevchenko;
- Kharkiv Philharmonic Society;
- Cinema concert hall "Ukraine";
- Kharkiv Planetarium;
- Kharkiv Zoo;
- Ukrainian Cultural Center;
- Historical Museum;
- UTOG House of Culture;
- 5 clubs and cultural centers in higher educational institutions;
- Cinemas named after Dovzhenko, "Park", "1st Komsomolskyi".
- Centralized library system of Shevchenkiv district

The largest hotels of the city are located in the area: "Kharkiv", "National", "Mir", "Kyivskyi".

== Health care ==
The district has 5 hospitals, 8 polyclinics and polyclinic departments, a maternity hospital, 4 dispensaries, 1 sanatorium, a regional blood transfusion station, a Children's Home, a Center for Clinical Genetics and Perinatal Diagnostics, a military hospital. On the territory of the district are the Research Institute of General and Emergency Surgery, the Ukrainian Research Institute of Prosthetics, the Research Institute of Occupational Hygiene and Occupational Diseases.

== Sport ==
On the territory of the district there are 5 swimming pools with a total water surface area of 3,647 m², including the Palace of Water Sports of the Olympic Educational and Sports Center "Akvarena", the sports complex of KhNU named after V.N. Karazina "High School", "Dynamo", "Zirka", "Pioneer", "Spartak" stadiums.

== Places ==
- Universytetska hirka
- Derzhprom
- Pavlivka
- Shatylivka
- Sokolnyky
- Pavlove Pole
- Oleksiivka
- Tykhi Vulytsi
