= Slobidskyi District =

Coordinates: 49°56′N 36°16′E

Slobidskyi District Слобідський район
- Urban district in Kharkiv
- Interactive map of Slobidskyi District
- Country: Ukraine
- Oblast: Kharkiv Oblast

Government
  - Head of Administration: Vyacheslav Ilyenko (Kernes Bloc — Successful Kharkiv)

Area
  - Total: 24.3 km^{2} (9.4 sq mi)

Population
  - Total: 146,850
- Time zone: UTC+2 (EET)
  - Summer (DST): UTC+3 (EEST)

1. Kholodnohirskyi District; 2. Shevchenkivskyi District; 3. Kyivskyi District; 4. Saltivskyi District; 5. Nemyshlianskyi District; 6. Industrialnyi District; 7. Slobidskyi District; 8. Osnovianskyi District; 9. Novobavarskyi District

Slobidskyi District (Ukrainian: Слобідський район) is an urban district of the city of Kharkiv, Ukraine, named after historical eastern region of Ukraine, Sloboda Ukraine.

The district was created in 1940 as Kominternivskyi after the Kharkiv Locomotive Factory of Komintern (today Malyshev Factory. In May 2016 it was renamed to its current name to comply with decommunization laws.

== Industry and trade ==
According to the data of the regional statistics office, 52 subjects of economic activity are registered in the register of industrial enterprises of the district. In 2006, more than 18,000 people were employed at processing industry enterprises.

There are eight leading industries in the structure of the district's industry:

1. The machine-building complex — 26.4% — includes three main sub-sectors:

- the production of machines and equipment, where the main producers are: "Malyshev Factory" (special equipment and engines for it, agricultural machines, diesel engines and diesel generators and others); JSC "Plant named after Frunze" — (latticed canvases, nets, etc.); JSC "Budgidroprivid" — (production and operation of volumetric regulation hydraulic drives, hydraulic pumps, equipment for agricultural and construction complexes, etc.);
- transport engineering, where the main producer is JSC KhVZ named after Petrovsky" — services for the production of various models and modifications of bicycles;
- production of electrical and electronic equipment — SE "KhRZ" and SE "Z-d "Radiorele"" — relay equipment.

2. Food and processing industry — 53.3%, where the main producers are enterprises that are part of the "Technocom" corporation: "Technocom" LLC, "EF-JI-FOOD" LLC, "Harproduct" LLC — production of food concentrates.

3. Chemical and petrochemical industry — 11.2% (JSC "Stoma" — medical equipment and pharmaceuticals).

4. Light industry — 2.6% (Kachanivska VTK No. 54, Proteks LLC).

5. Pulp, paper and printing industry — 2.1% (Pakservice LLC and Uchbovy Druk LLC).

6. Production of non-metallic mineral products (building materials) — 1.2% (JSC ZhBK and LLC S.K.S.M.).

7. Metallurgy and metal processing — 0.5% (SE "MK SKSM" and LLC "Blysk").

8. Other productions not classified as other industries — 1.2% (JSC "Kharkivderev" and JSC "Vtormet").

== Education and science ==
In 2006, a network of educational institutions operated:

- 19 secondary schools, including: 1 lyceum: #46; 3 gymnasiums No. 82, 83, 178; 2 specialized schools — No. 77, 114;

NEC "Kindergarten School No. 112"; Technical Lyceum No. 173; 6 private schools; Children's School of Arts; Sports school (DYSSH — 6);

- 14 children's preschool institutions;
- 3 extracurricular institutions, including: Station of young technicians; Center for children's creativity.

There are 522 classes in communally owned schools with a total number of students — 13,713 people, the average capacity is 26.3 people. with an average population in the city of 28 people.

There are 50 classes, 530 students and 11 preschool groups (165 children) in 6 private schools.

130 groups attended by 2,627 children in 14 children's preschool institutions. There are 9 groups, including 167 children, in the structure of NEC No. 112. There are a total of 139 groups in the district attended by 2,794 children. The average capacity is 20.1 people.

On the basis of preschool institutions, there are four 1st grades, where 78 students study.

The National University of Internal Affairs is located on the territory of the district, there are scientific institutions — KP "HKBM named after O. O. Morozova", OJSC "KHNTK", OJSC HDKTB refrigerating machines, KP "HKBD".

== Culture ==
The provision of services to the population in the field of culture is carried out by 11 cultural institutions:

- 6 public libraries, with a book collection of 370.4 thousand copies, serve more than 25 thousand readers;
- The Park of Culture and Recreation of the Machine Builders, located on 70 hectares, receives more than 8,000 visitors a year.
- Children's Art School No. 5 unites 408 children and teenagers in 4 departments: music, theater, choreography, art;
- Palace of Culture "Metalist" SE "Zavod named after Malysheva".

== Health care ==
There are 12 medical institutions with 1,315 beds on the territory of the district, including:

- City Polyclinic No. 21,
- City Polyclinic No. 19,
- City Children's Polyclinic No. 1,
- City Dental Polyclinic No. 2,
- Dermatology and Venereal Dispensary No. 13,
- City Hospital No. 13 — 305 beds,
- Regional Clinical Infectious Disease Hospital No. 22 — 240 beds,
- Regional Clinical Children's Infectious Disease Hospital No. 8 — 350 beds,
- Dispensary anti-tuberculosis department No. 4 of city PDD No. 1 — 120 beds,
- City Children's Specialized Sanatorium No. 6 — 100 beds,
- Regional narcological inpatient complex — 200 beds,
- State-supported dental polyclinic "Lia".

352 doctors of all specialties and 616 people are involved in the health care system. average medical staff. The number of the served population is 123.6 thousand people, of which 83.5% are adults.

Expanded and stable functions in the 19th polyclinic of the department of general practitioners — family medicine in 8 districts. In the 1st children's polyclinic, the process of vision correction for children is organized on the basis of purchased computer programs.

In the 19th polyclinic, a speleotherapy room was reconstructed for the treatment of patients with diseases of the upper respiratory tract. Cholesterol in the blood is determined on the basis of new laboratory equipment "photomeasures".

== Sport ==
One of the largest stadiums in Ukraine, Metalist, is located on the territory of the Slobodsky district. Until 2016, the FC Metalist was based at the stadium, but after the dissolution of the club, FC Shakhtar Donetsk became based at the stadium until 2020.

== Places ==
- Hertzena
- Kachanivka
- Horbani
- Novi Domy

== Gallery ==
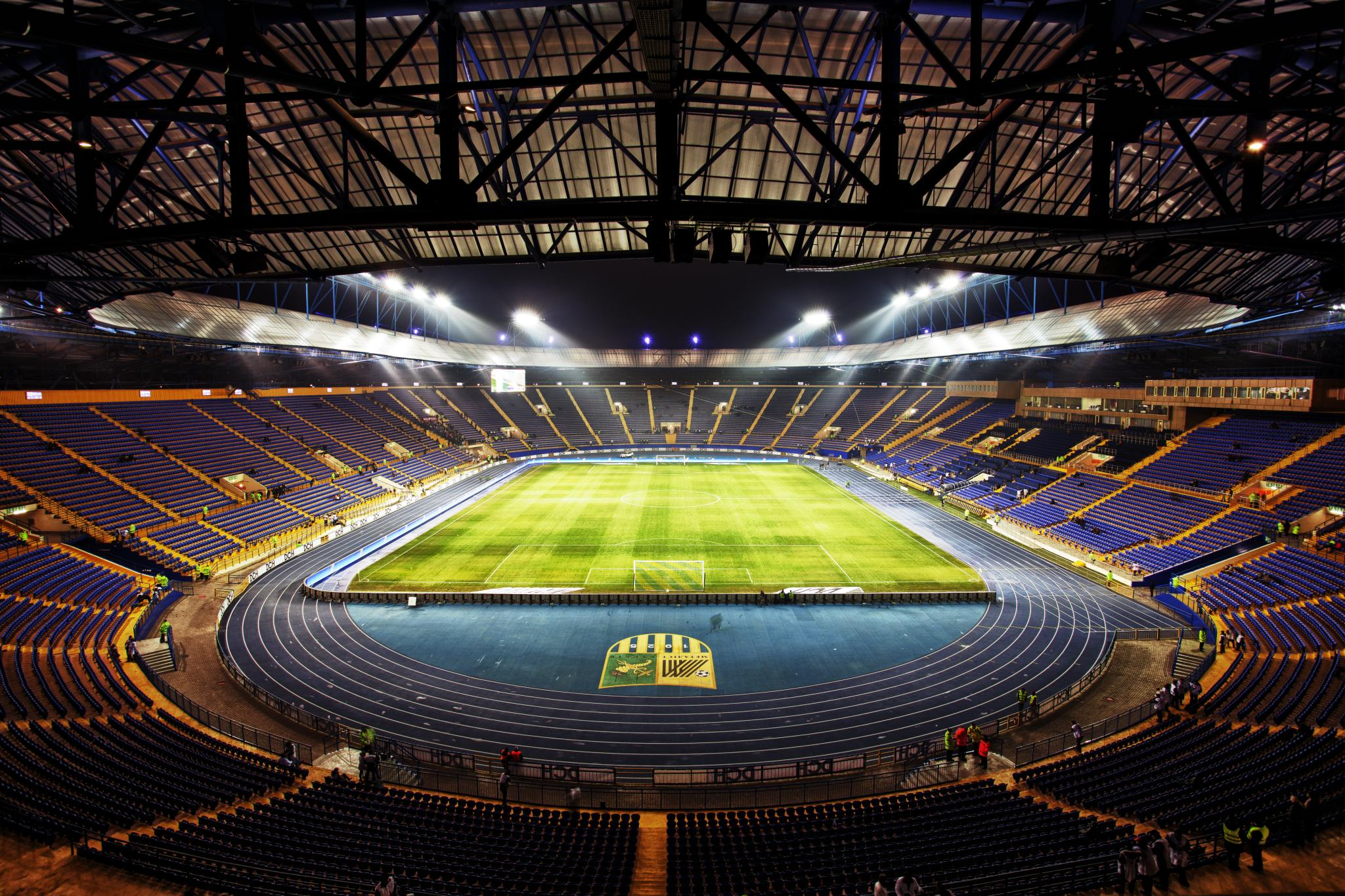
Metalist Stadium

Malyshev Factory

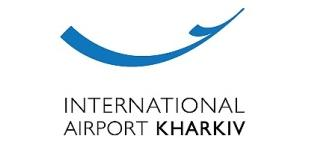
Kharkiv International Airport
