= Kyivskyi District, Kharkiv =

Urban district in Kharkiv, Ukraine

Coordinates: 50.000°N 36.250°E

Kyivskyi District Київський район
- Urban district in Kharkiv
- Seal
- Interactive map of Kyivskyi District
- Country: Ukraine
- Oblast: Kharkiv Oblast

Government
  - Head of Administration: Nelli Kazanzhieva (Kernes Bloc — Successful Kharkiv)

Area
  - Total: 46.2 km^{2} (17.8 sq mi)

Population
  - Total: 182,900
- Time zone: UTC+2 (EET)
  - Summer (DST): UTC+3 (EEST)

1. Kholodnohirskyi District; 2. Shevchenkivskyi District; 3. Kyivskyi District; 4. Saltivskyi District; 5. Nemyshlianskyi District; 6. Industrialnyi District; 7. Slobidskyi District; 8. Osnovianskyi District; 9. Novobavarskyi District

Kyivskyi District (Ukrainian: Київський район) is an urban district of the city of Kharkiv, Ukraine, named after the capital city of Ukraine, Kyiv. It is the biggest raion of the city and one of the oldest.

The district was created in 1937 when Petynsko-Zhuravlivskyi District was split into Kahanovychskyi and Stalinskyi districts. In 1957 Kahanovchskyi District was renamed Kyivskyi District.

== Industry and trade ==
According to the results of 2005, 2,928 small enterprises — subjects of entrepreneurial activity — were registered in the district, including 2,090 of them had sales volumes. Compared to 2004, the number of small enterprises increased by 4.6%, is the largest among other districts of Kharkiv and accounts for 19.6% of the city indicator. The number of subjects of entrepreneurial activity — natural persons — is 12,750 (by 9.3% more than in 2004).

The average registered number of employees working at small business enterprises was 18,521 (including part-time workers). On average, one small enterprise employed 6 people. The wage fund in 2005 increased by 25.9% compared to 2004 and amounted to UAH 106.15 million. The average monthly salary of employees in 2005 increased by 31.2% compared to 2004 and is the highest among the districts of Kharkiv and the region — UAH 478.42. (in the region — 427.16 hryvnias, in the city of Kharkiv — 438.76 hryvnias).

In 2005, small enterprises of the district sold products (works, services) in the total amount of UAH 802.8 million, which is 109.9% of the volume of sales in 2004 and 18.5% of the city volume (2nd place in Kharkiv). The total amount of operating expenses for the sale of products (works, services) amounted to UAH 811.26 million.

On 1.01. In 2006, the number of shops in Kyiv district was 668:

- food - 250 units. catering enterprises — 365 units.
- in communal ownership (school canteens) — 23 units.
- in collective ownership — 170 units.
- in private ownership — 172 units.

household objects — 370 units.

- in communal ownership - 2 units.
- in collective ownership — 180 units.
- in private ownership - 188 units.

== Education and science ==
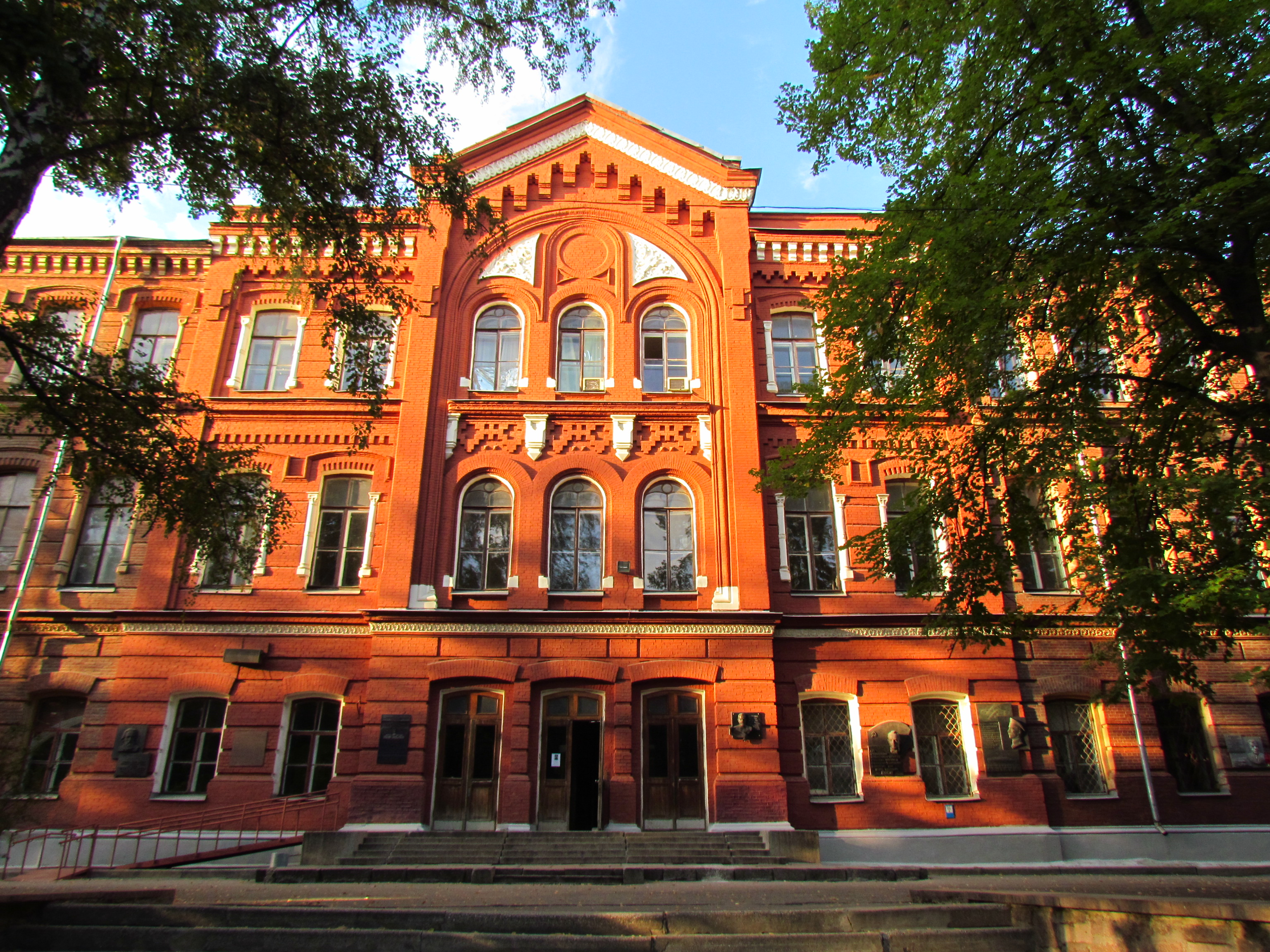
Main building of the Kharkiv Polytechnic Institute

There are 21 higher educational institutions on the territory of the Kyiv district, which is the largest number among the districts of the city of Kharkiv. 17 of them are state-owned. On the territory of the district are located: National Aerospace University – Kharkiv Aviation Institute, Yaroslav Mudryi National Law University, Kharkiv Polytechnic Institute, Kharkiv National Automobile and Highway University, etc.

== Culture ==
On the territory of the district there are municipal institutions of the city network, which are financed from the district budget:

The cultural center of the Kyiv district (which includes the cultural center in V. Danylivka m/r and the memorial aviation museum of the Gryzodubov family), which has 700 seats;

- Lyceum of Arts No. 133, which has 863 students;
- Children's Music School No. 6 named after M.V. Lysenko and children's music school No. 14 — 439 students.
- 9 libraries of the centralized district library system with a book fund of 374,000 copies.

On the territory of the district there are also:

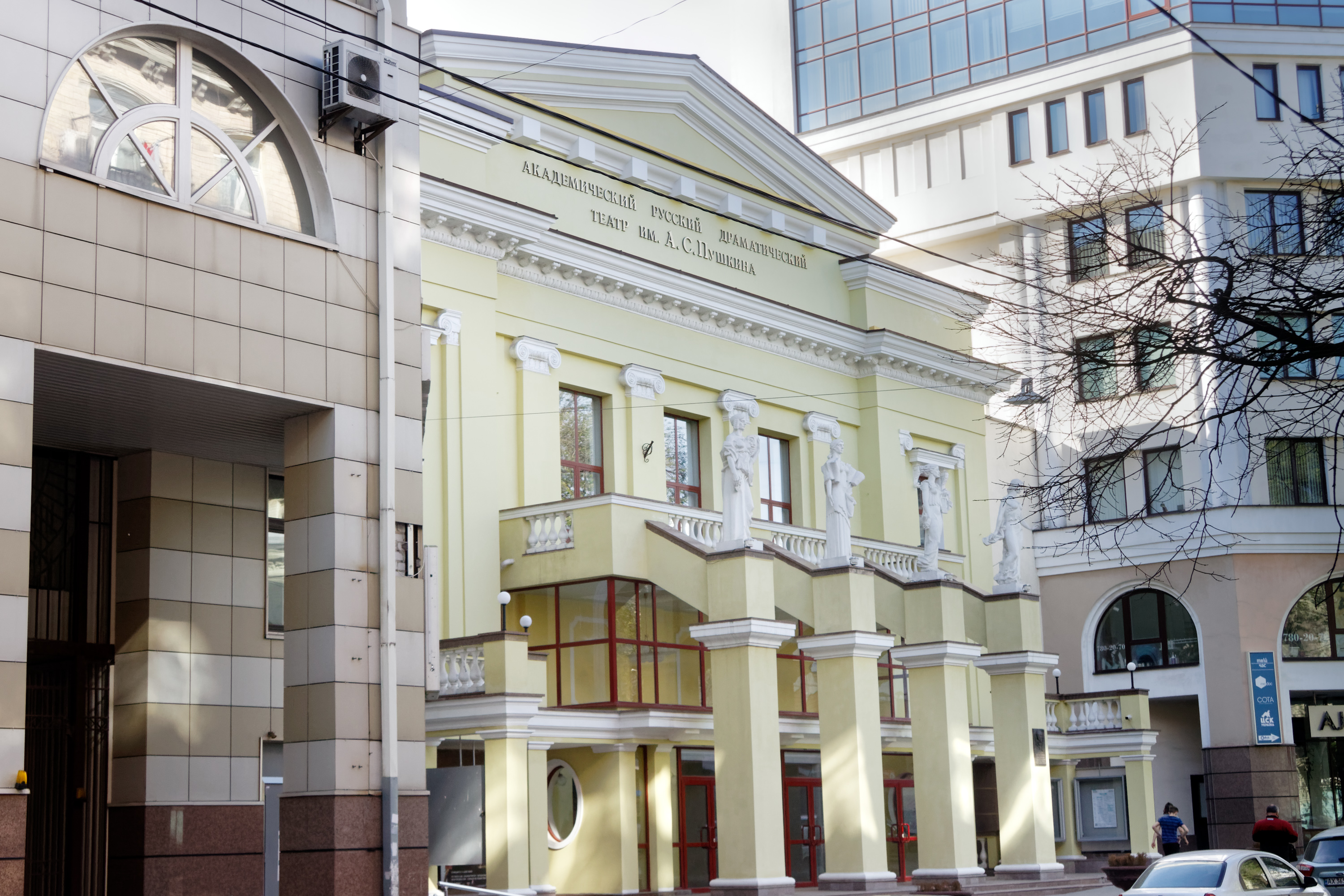
Kharkiv Academic Drama Theater

- Kharkiv Academic Drama Theater
- Academic Puppet Theater named after V. Afanasyeva
- City Art Gallery named after Vasylkivskyi
- Regional center of folk art
- Art and literary museums
- State Scientific Library named after Korolenko
- Regional children's library
- Kharkiv branch of national creative unions: writers, artists, photo artists, theater actors and other creative associations.

Club institutions:

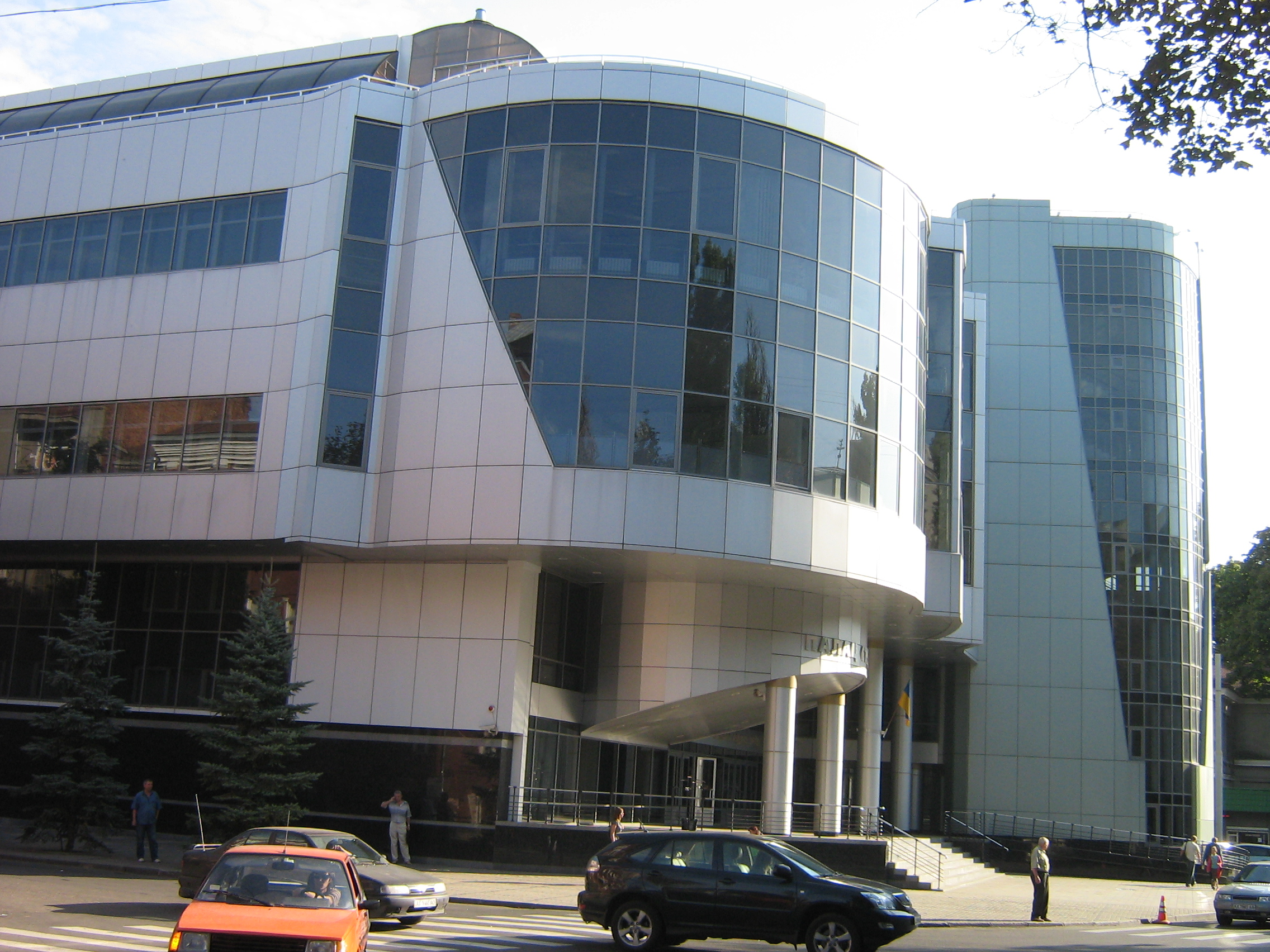
Palace of Students of the Yaroslav Mudryi National Law University

- Palace of Culture of the NVP "Union of Communards"
- Palace of Students of the Yaroslav Mudryi National Law University
- Palace of Students of the National Polytechnic University "KhPI"
- Palace of Culture of the Department of Internal Affairs of the Kharkiv region
- Palace of Culture of Vocational Training
- House of scientists
- Teacher's house

== Health care ==
There are a total of 7 medical and preventive institutions in the health care management system of the Kyiv District Council: medical and preventive institutions (city clinical hospital No. 27, city hospital No. 28, city polyclinic No. 10, city children's polyclinic No. 23), which provide the first medical sanitary assistance;

- maternity hospital No. 3 with women's consultation, gynecological department, maternity department;
- 2 medical and preventive institutions, providing specialized medical care (dental polyclinic No. 1, city clinical skin and venereological dispensary No. 5).

The bed fund of the district is 605 beds, the capacity of polyclinics is 2474 visits per shift.

Out of 7 medical and preventive institutions, only city polyclinic No. 10 and polyclinic No. 1 of the city children's polyclinic No. 23 are located in new typical buildings, all other medical and preventive institutions are in adapted buildings with a high percentage of wear and tear.

Municipal hospitals:

- city clinical hospital No. 30 — 210 beds
- city clinical hospital No. 14 — 270 beds
- psychoneurological dispensary No. 3
- anti-tuberculosis dispensary department No. 5 of the city clinical anti-tuberculosis dispensary No. 1 — 120 beds

Regional subordination:

- regional student hospital — 240 beds
- regional tuberculosis dispensary — 200 beds
- regional clinical oncology dispensary — 450 beds
- regional psychoneurological dispensary

Departmental institutions:

- Specialized medical and sanitary unit No. 13 — 160 beds
- Children's Hospital of the Southern Railway - 150 beds
- Polyclinic of the Ukrainian Armed Forces, SBU
- Dental polyclinic No. 220

== Sport ==
Kharkiv regional higher school of physical culture and sports, 10 secondary schools work in the district.

== Places ==
- District's center
- Saltivka micro-district 522
- Pivnichna Saltivka (micro-districts): 2, 3, 4, 5
- Piatykhatky
- settlement Zhukovskoho (after Nikolay Yegorovich Zhukovsky)
- Verkhnya Shyshkivka, Nyzhnia Shyshkivka
- Velyka Danylivka
- Zhuravlivka
- Shevchenky
- Komunar
- Tiurinka
