= Frunzensky =

Frunzensky (masculine), Frunzenskaya (feminine), or Frunzenskoye (neuter) may refer to:

- Frunzensky District (disambiguation), name of several districts in countries of the former Soviet Union
- Frunzensky (rural locality) (Frunzenskaya, Frunzenskoye), name of several rural localities in Russia
- Frunzenskaya (Moscow Metro), a rail station in Russia
- Frunzenskaya (Saint Petersburg Metro), a rail station in Russia
- Frunzenskaya (Minsk Metro), a rail station in Belarus
- Frunzenskoye, former name of the village of Pülgön, Kyrgyzstan
- Frunzenskoe, Tüp, a village in Issyk-Kul Region, Kyrgyzstan

== See also ==
- Frunze (disambiguation)
