= Kholodnohirskyi District =

Coordinates: 49°59′43″N 36°10′39″E

Kholodnohirskyi District Холодногірський район
- Urban district in Kharkiv
- Interactive map of Kholodnohirskyi District
- Country: Ukraine
- Oblast: Kharkiv Oblast

Government
  - Head of Administration: Alina Titova (Kernes Bloc — Successful Kharkiv)

Area
  - Total: 30.4 km^{2} (11.7 sq mi)

Population
  - Total: 91,300
- Time zone: UTC+2 (EET)
  - Summer (DST): UTC+3 (EEST)

1. Kholodnohirskyi District; 2. Shevchenkivskyi District; 3. Kyivskyi District; 4. Saltivskyi District; 5. Nemyshlianskyi District; 6. Industrialnyi District; 7. Slobidskyi District; 8. Osnovianskyi District; 9. Novobavarskyi District

Kholodnohirskyi District (Ukrainian: Холодногірський район) is an urban district of the city of Kharkiv, Ukraine, named after a neighborhood in the city Kholodna Hora.

The district appeared sometime around 1930 when Ivano-Lysohirskyi District was renamed into Leninskyi District. In 2016 it was renamed into Kholodnohirskyi to comply with decommunization laws.

== Industry and transport ==
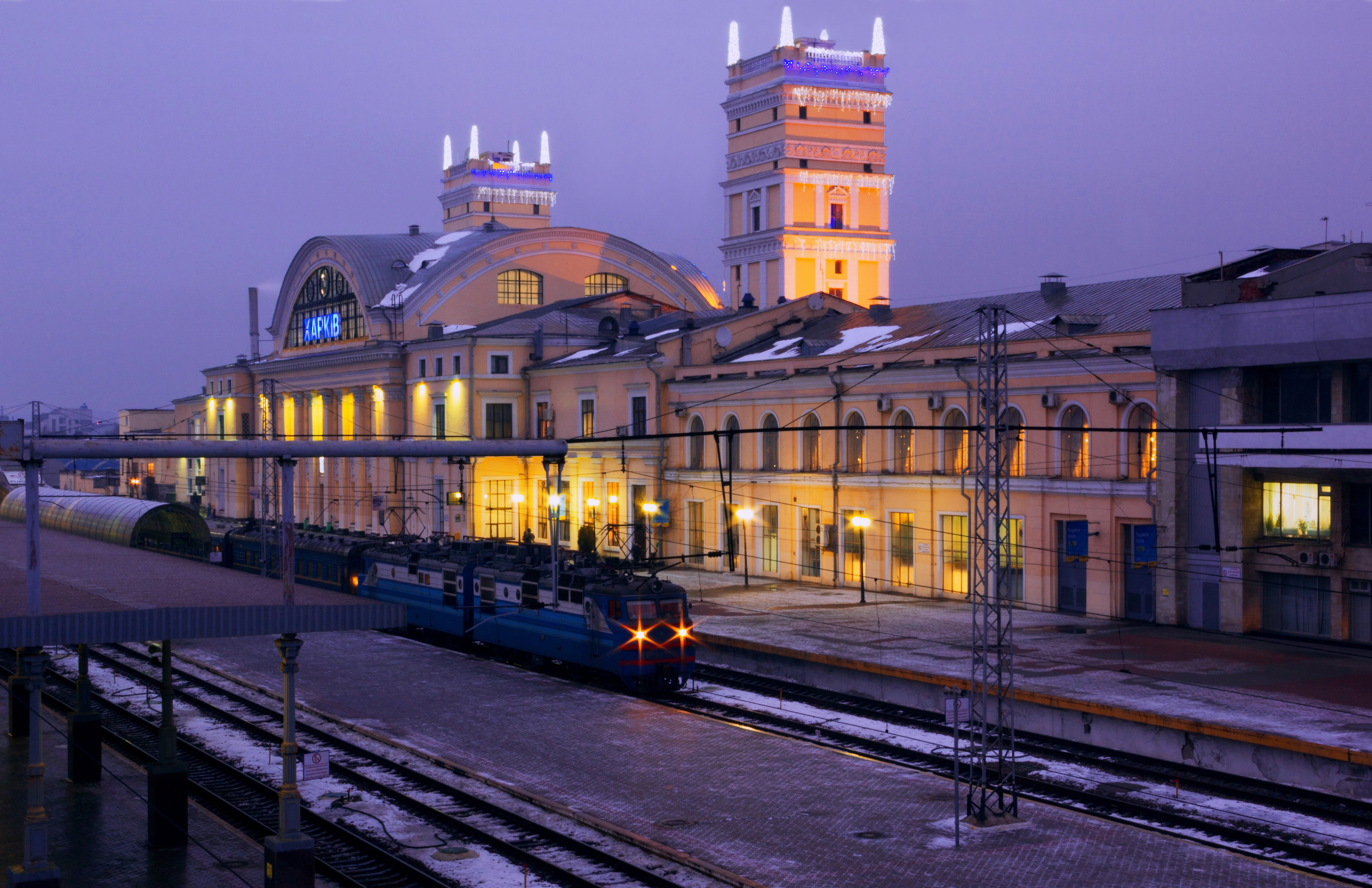
Kharkiv railway station

In the area there are the Kharkiv-Pasazhirskyi and Kharkiv-Sortuvalnyi railway stations, as well as the administration of the Southern Railway and the administration of the Kharkov Metro.

The region's industry is represented by 61 enterprises, of which:

- mechanical engineering - 19 enterprises
- metallurgy and metal processing - 8 enterprises
- food industry - 8 enterprises
- light industry - 7 enterprises
- wood production - 1 enterprise
- pulp, paper and printing industry - 5 enterprises
- chemical and petrochemical industry - 5 enterprises
- heat production - 4 enterprises
- production of building materials - 2 enterprises
- other production - 2 enterprises

More than 51% of the total volume of production is produced by enterprises of the processing and food industry.

The city's industrial products included: refrigerating and freezing equipment, heating boilers, metal cutting machines, pumps, hydraulic stations, presses, stamps and molds, engines, direct current machines, electric motors for mine electric locomotives, electric pumps, electromagnetic clutches, circuit breakers, prosthetics— orthopedic products, electric razors, electric, heat, and water meters, freight cars, plastic and film products, heat exchange equipment, secondary aluminum alloys, prefabricated concrete and reinforced concrete products; food industry products included grape champagne, table and strong wines, confectionery from the Kharkiv Biscuit Factory, and ice cream and chocolate wafer products from Polyus LTD JV; light industry products included outerwear and bed linen; and book and magazine production.

== Education and science ==
There are 12 secondary schools in the district with 8,032 students and a special evening secondary school with 151 pupils. 2256 children are educated in 20 preschool institutions.

In the district there is a technical school of the dairy industry, a medical school of the Southern Railway, an art school, a professional lyceum of sewing technologies, a professional lyceum of railway transport, vocational and technical school No. 41.

== Culture ==
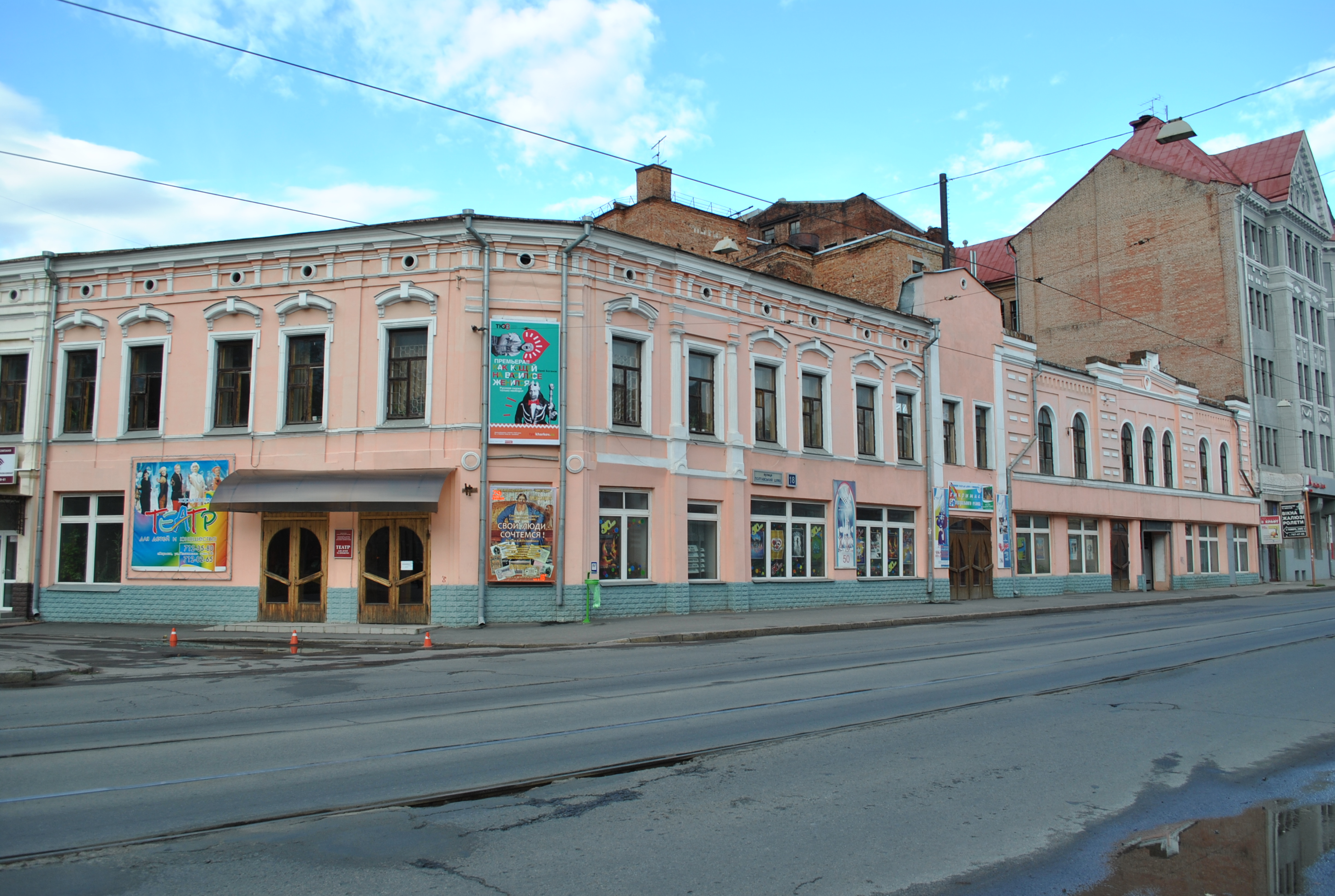
Kharkiv Theater for Children and Youth

In the Kholodnohirskyi District there are 6 museums, 48 architectural monuments, 34 monuments. There are two theaters — the Musical Comedy and the Theater for Children and Youth, two cinemas, 8 centralized libraries, 9 parks and squares, clubs and houses of culture (the House of Science and Technology of Railway Workers, the garrison House of Officers with 840 seats, the House of Culture of the Novyi byt microdistrict).

For physical education and sports, there is a stadium and three sports palaces in the area. There are 9 medical institutions in the region.

== Health care ==
There are 9 medical institutions operating in the district, of which 3 are under district control, 2 are under city control, 3 are under regional control, and 1 is under departmental control.

== Sport ==
There is 1 stadium, 3 sports palaces, 4 physical culture and health centers, 7 shooting ranges, 20 sports halls, 37 sports grounds and fields, 17 gymnasiums with simulators and equipment in the district for physical education and sports.

== Places ==
- Kholodna Hora
- Lysa Hora
- Ivanivka
- Zaliutyne
- Zalopan
- Panasivka
- Laherne
- Hyivka
- Sortyrovka
