= Frunzensky (rural locality) =

Frunzensky (Russian: Фрунзенский; masculine), Frunzenskaya (Фрунзенская; feminine), or Frunzenskoye (Фрунзенское; neuter) is the name of several rural localities in Russia:

- Frunzensky, Orenburg Oblast, a settlement in Krasnogvardeysky District of Orenburg Oblast
- Frunzensky, Samara Oblast, a settlement in Bolsheglushitsky District of Samara Oblast
- Frunzenskoye, Chechen Republic, a stanitsa in Naursky District of the Chechen Republic
- Frunzenskoye, Kaliningrad Oblast, a settlement in Pravdinsky District of Kaliningrad Oblast
