= Frunză =

Frunză, the Romanian word for "leaf", may refer to:

- Frunză, Ocnița, a town in Ocniţa district, Moldova
- Frunză, Transnistria, a commune in Slobozia district, Transnistria, Moldova
- Frunza, a village in Logrești, Gorj County, Romania

== People with the surname ==
- Axinte Frunză (1859–1933), Bessarabian Romanian scholar, novelist, and revolutionary
- Mikhail Frunze (known in Romanian as Mihail Frunză; 1885–1925), Soviet general and politician
- Sorin Frunză (born 1978), Romanian footballer
- Viorel Frunză (born 1979), Moldovan footballer

== See also ==
- Frunze (disambiguation)
