= Novobavarskyi District =

Coordinates: 49°58′N 36°12′E

Novobavarskyi District Новобаварський район
- Urban district in Kharkiv
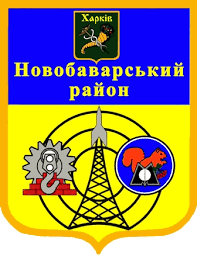
- Seal
- Interactive map of Novobavarskyi District
- Country: Ukraine
- Oblast: Kharkiv Oblast

Government
  - Head of Administration: Tetyana Tsybulnyk (Kernes Bloc — Successful Kharkiv)

Area
  - Total: 34.7 km^{2} (13.4 sq mi)

Population
  - Total: 108,100
- Time zone: UTC+2 (EET)
  - Summer (DST): UTC+3 (EEST)

1. Kholodnohirskyi District; 2. Shevchenkivskyi District; 3. Kyivskyi District; 4. Saltivskyi District; 5. Nemyshlianskyi District; 6. Industrialnyi District; 7. Slobidskyi District; 8. Osnovianskyi District; 9. Novobavarskyi District

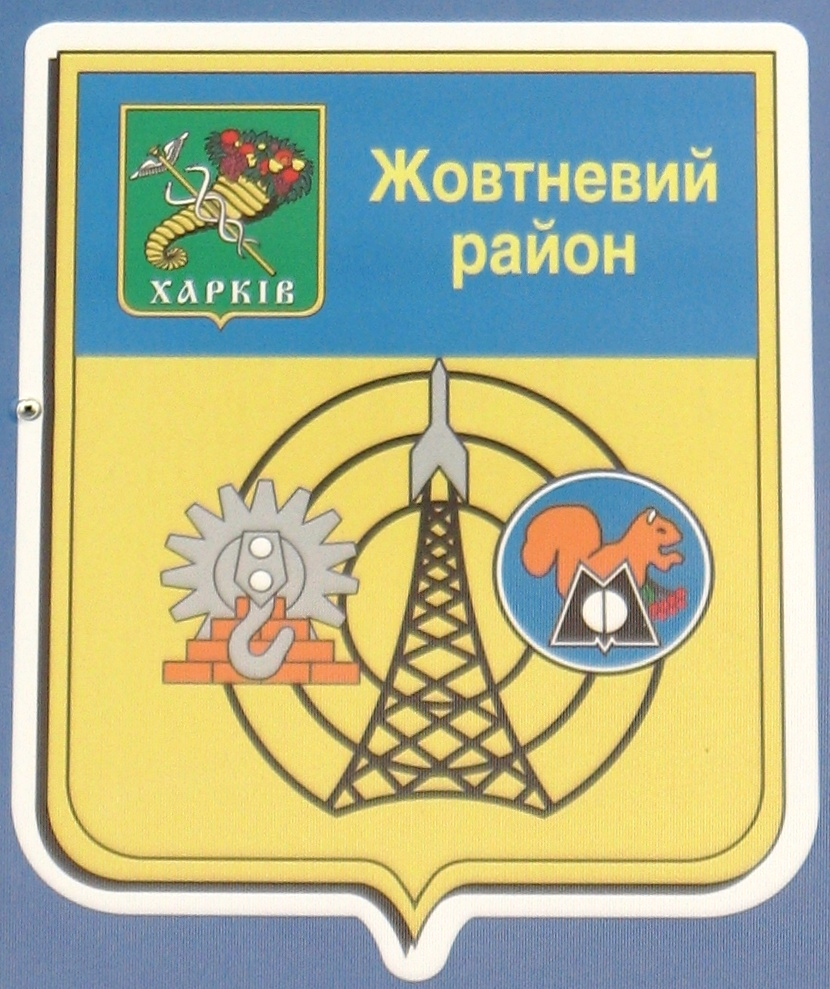
Coat of arms of the former Zhovtnevyi District

Novobavarskyi District (Ukrainian: Новобаварський район), formerly known as Zhovtnevyi District, is an urban district of the city of Kharkiv, Ukraine, named after a neighborhood in the city Nova Bavariia.

The district was established in 1924. In 2016 it was renamed to its current name to comply with decommunization laws.

== Industry and trade ==
The total number of industrial enterprises is 51. The total number of employed persons is 18,569.

The structure of industrial production (the specific weight of types of economic activity to the total output of industrial products of the district):

- mechanical engineering 37.4%
- light industry 10.5%
- food industry 8.0%
- metallurgy 4.7%
- chemical industry 3.6%
- wood production 0.2%
- pulp and paper industry 0.8%
- other production (production of office furniture) 34.8%

== Education and science ==
On the territory of the district operates:

- 19 schools with 9,187 students, including: Physics and Mathematics Lyceum No. 27 with 558 students; Kharkiv Gymnasium No. 65 for 714 students;
- two specialized schools: No. 162 with in-depth study of a foreign language for 1,240 students; No. 93 of the aesthetic direction for 537 students;
- two educational complexes: "Kindergarten School" No. 153 for 842 students; No. 182 for 46 students.
- private school "The Beginning of Wisdom" for 110 students;
- 11 preschool institutions for 2,053 children, including: 2 sanatoriums (No. 38, 231), in which 233 tubin-infected children undergo a course of treatment; specialized preschool institution No. 143 with speech therapy groups for 285 children.

The Center for Children's Creativity has 70 groups, in which 1,365 children are engaged. In children's and youth sports school No. 5, 1,076 people play sports in 73 circles in 4 departments. At the station of young technicians, 69 clubs for 1480 people have been opened.

== Culture ==
There are eight club-type cultural institutions on the territory of the district, of which there are seven departmental club cultural institutions and one private youth club.

In the Novobavar district of Kharkiv, there are three educational institutions of aesthetic education (in which 890 students study):

- Children's Art School No. 2 named after P. I. Tchaikovsky;
- Children's School of Arts No. 4 named after M. D. Leontovich;
- Children's Music School No. 7 named after M. P. Mussorgsky,

10 mass libraries with a book collection of more than 431,000 copies serve more than 25,000 readers a year.

== Sport ==
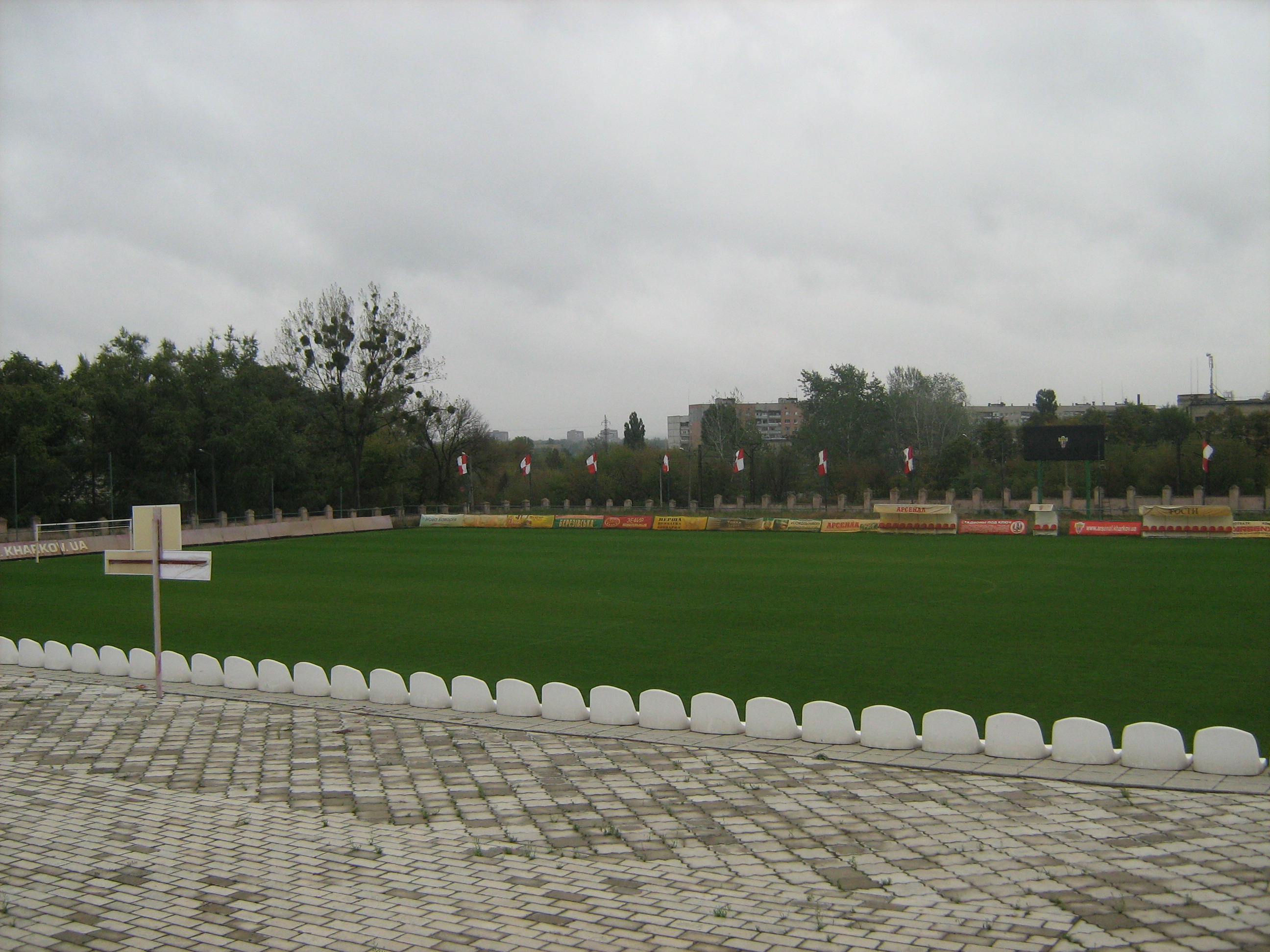
Helios-Arena, Kharkiv (formerly Arsenal-Bavaria Stadium)

In the district, there are two children's sports schools No. 5 and sports schools "Mayak", sports club "Miner's Light", "Helios Arena", 7 sports clubs at the place of residence. The "Helios Arena" stadium is hosting the championship of Ukraine of the first football league with the participation of the FC Helios Kharkiv.
