= Nemyshlianskyi District =

Coordinates: 49.950°N 36.317°E

Nemyshlianskyi District Немишлянський район
- Urban district in Kharkiv
- Interactive map of Nemyshlianskyi District
- Country: Ukraine
- Oblast: Kharkiv Oblast

Government
  - Head of Administration: Tetyana Myronenko (Kernes Bloc — Successful Kharkiv)

Area
  - Total: 31.07 km^{2} (12.00 sq mi)

Population
  - Total: 146,300
- Time zone: UTC+2 (EET)
  - Summer (DST): UTC+3 (EEST)

| 1. Kholodnohirskyi District; 2. Shevchenkivskyi District; 3. Kyivskyi District; 4. Saltivskyi District; 5. Nemyshlianskyi District; 6. Industrialnyi District; 7. Slobidskyi District; 8. Osnovianskyi District; 9. Novobavarskyi District |

Nemyshlianskyi District (Ukrainian: Немишлянський район) is an urban district of the city of Kharkiv, Ukraine, named after a neighborhood and river in the city Nemyshlia.

== History ==
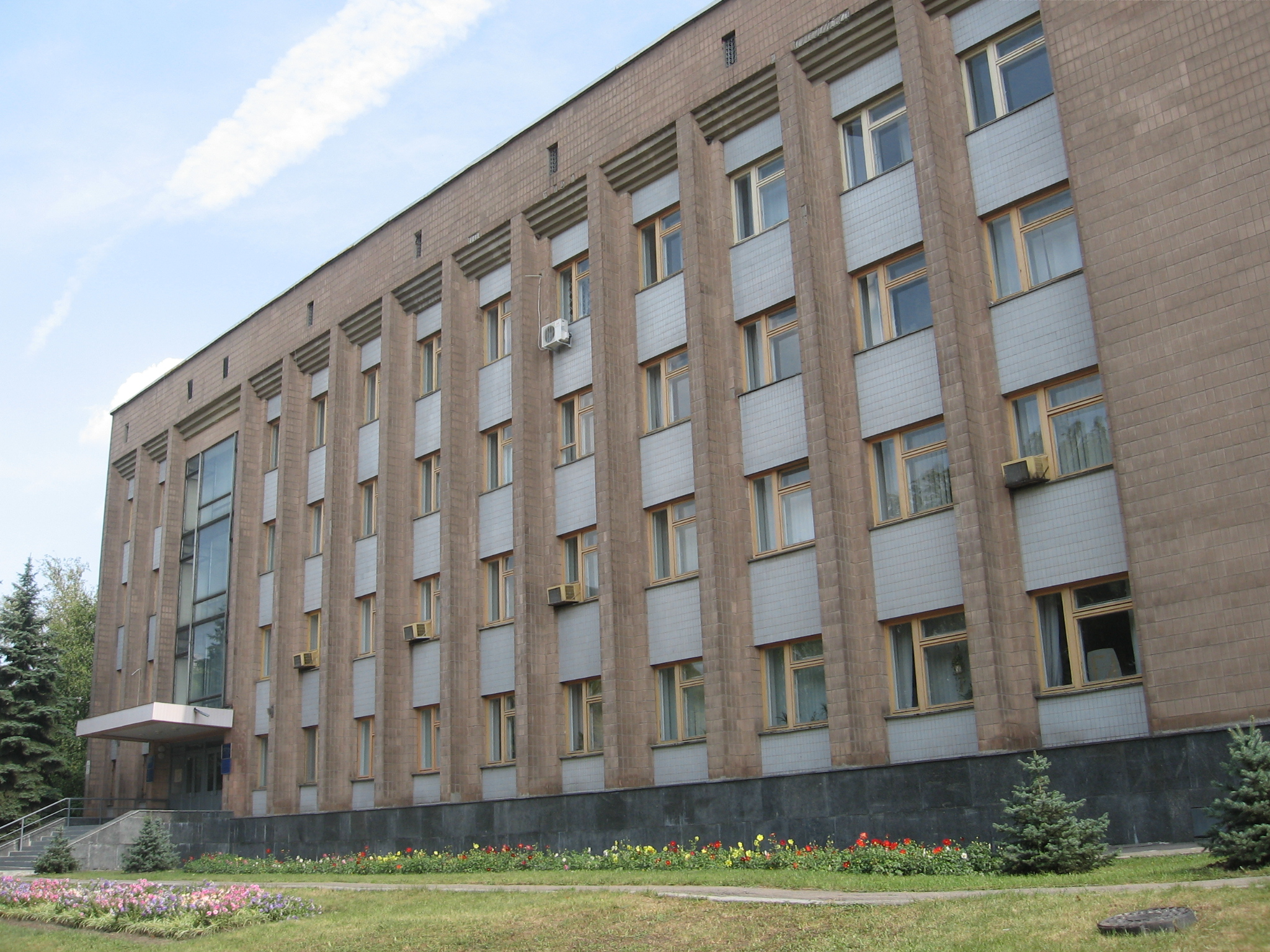
Administration of Nemyshlianskyi District

The district was formed by the Decree of the Presidium of the Supreme Soviet of the Ukrainian SSR on April 12, from part of the territories of the Moskovskyi, Ordzhonikidzevskyi, and Kominternivskyi districts of the city and was named after the military leader, commander of the Southern Front of the Red Army, whose headquarters was located in Kharkiv, Mikhail Frunze. In 2016 it was renamed to its current name to comply with decommunization laws.

The establishment of the district was driven by rapid industrial, social, and cultural development, alongside the construction of new residential complexes and major facilities. These included the Printing Complex, the Institute for Mechanical Engineering Problems, and new facilities for the Turbine Plant.

At the time of its establishment, the newly formed district accommodated 21 industrial enterprises, 20 construction firms, five transport organizations, and several scientific institutions. The educational and childcare infrastructure included 12 schools with an enrollment of 17,000 students, and 15 preschools serving 6,000 children.

Cultural and healthcare facilities comprised three clubs, the Kyiv Cinema, seven libraries, and six medical institutions. The local commerce and service sector consisted of 64 retail stores, 60 catering establishments, and 54 public service outlets. Sports and recreational infrastructure featured three stadiums, 14 gymnasiums, 11 football pitches, 15 basketball courts, and 35 volleyball courts.

On March 5, 2013, the Kharkiv Oblast Council passed a resolution incorporating the urban-type settlement of Kulynychi, the settlement of Peremoha, and the village of Brazhnyky into the Nemyshlyanskyi District of Kharkiv.

During the Russian Invasion of Ukraine, three drones hit the petrol station in the district following a Russian attack on Kharkiv.

== Industry and trade ==
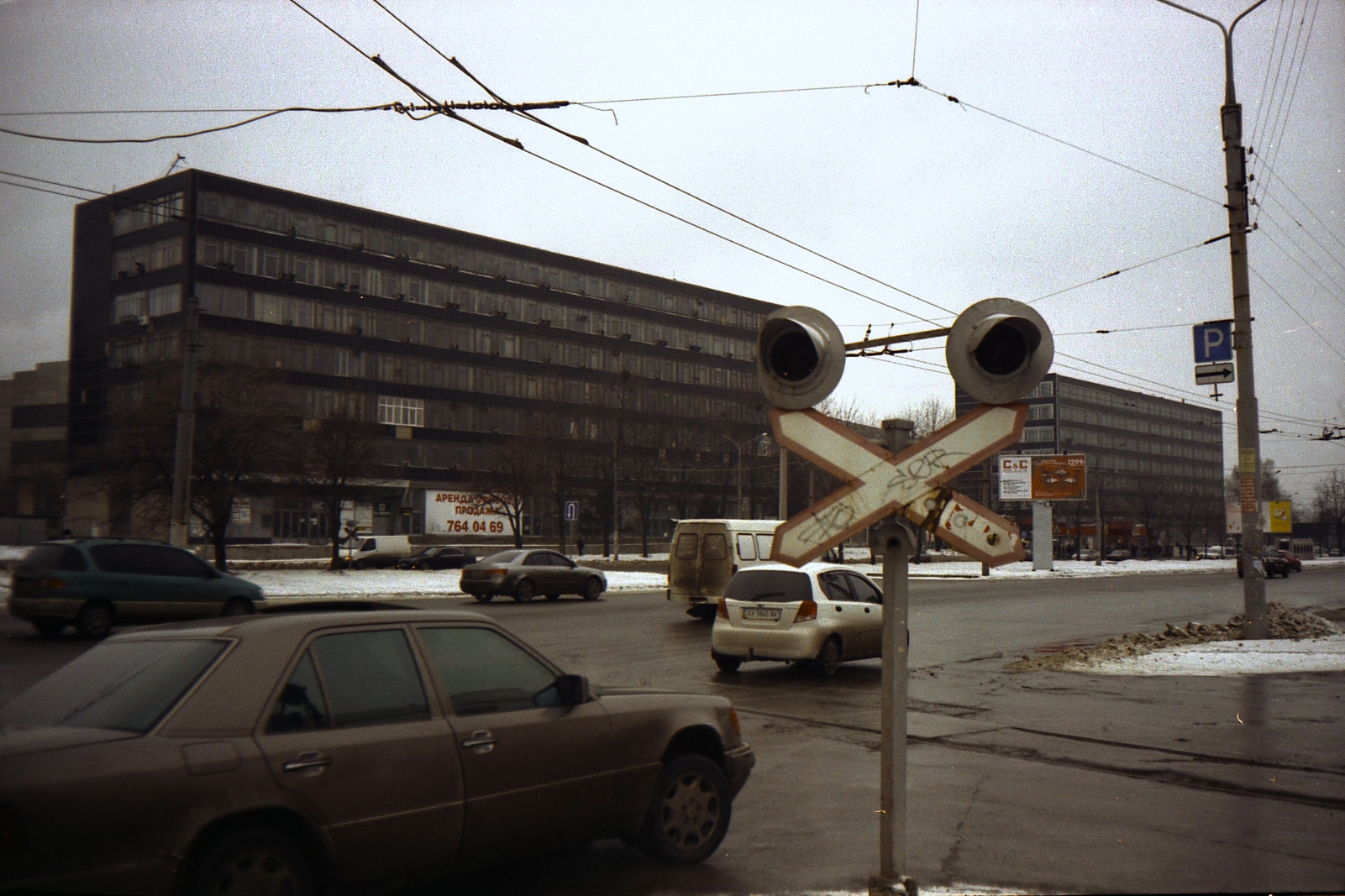
Ukrainian Energy Machines Joint Stock Company "Turboatom"

The district's industrial sector is represented by power engineering, agricultural machinery, and construction materials manufacturing.

The major enterprises operating within the district include:

- Turboatom – a leading manufacturer of power engineering equipment for thermal, nuclear, and hydroelectric power plants;
- Yuzhkabel Plant – a major producer of insulated wires and cables designed for high-responsibility facilities;
- Saltivsky Meat Processing Plant – a sausage and meat products manufacturer;
- Khladoprom – an ice cream manufacturer.

The construction sector comprises 21 organizations, with SB Rembudservice LLC and Firm Scorpion RP LLC being the most prominent.

== Education and science ==
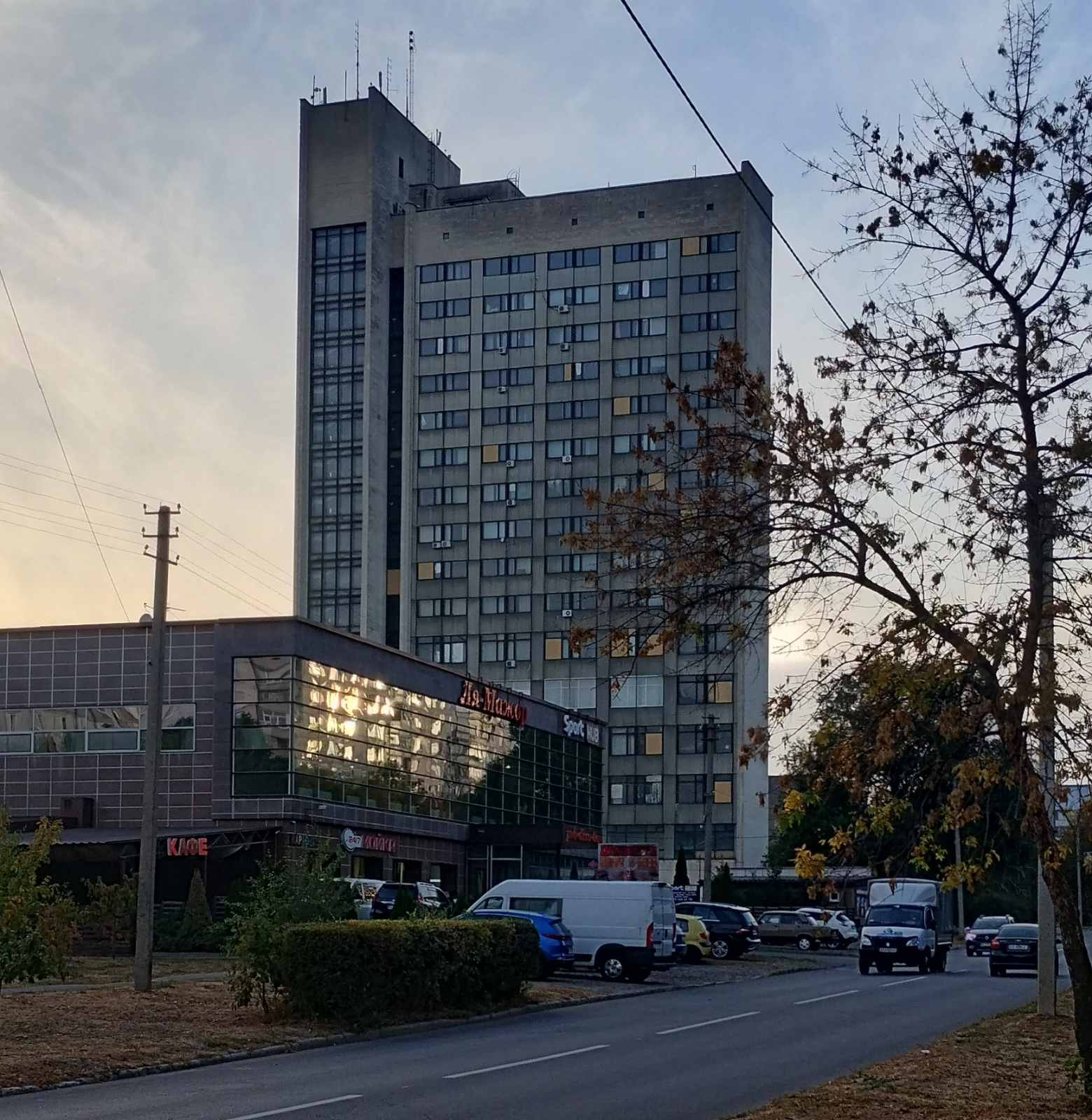
Institute for Mechanical Engineering Problems of the National Academy of Sciences of Ukraine, the Research

The Nemyshlyanskyi District is home to 46 educational institutions. The public education system comprises 20 general education schools and 17 preschools. Additionally, the district hosts two extracurricular educational institutions and three private schools. Higher and vocational education is represented by the Kharkiv Medical College No. 2, the Kharkiv Professional Lyceum of Construction, the Kharkiv Industrial and Pedagogical Technical School (branch), and the Medical College of the Kharkiv Medical Academy of Post-graduate Education.

The district also accommodates nine research and design institutes, many of which have international recognition. Prominent institutions include the V. Ya. Yuryev Institute of Plant Production, the Institute for Mechanical Engineering Problems of the National Academy of Sciences of Ukraine, the Research, Design and Technological Institute of Micrography, and the Kharkiv Medical Academy of Post-graduate Education.

== Culture and sports ==
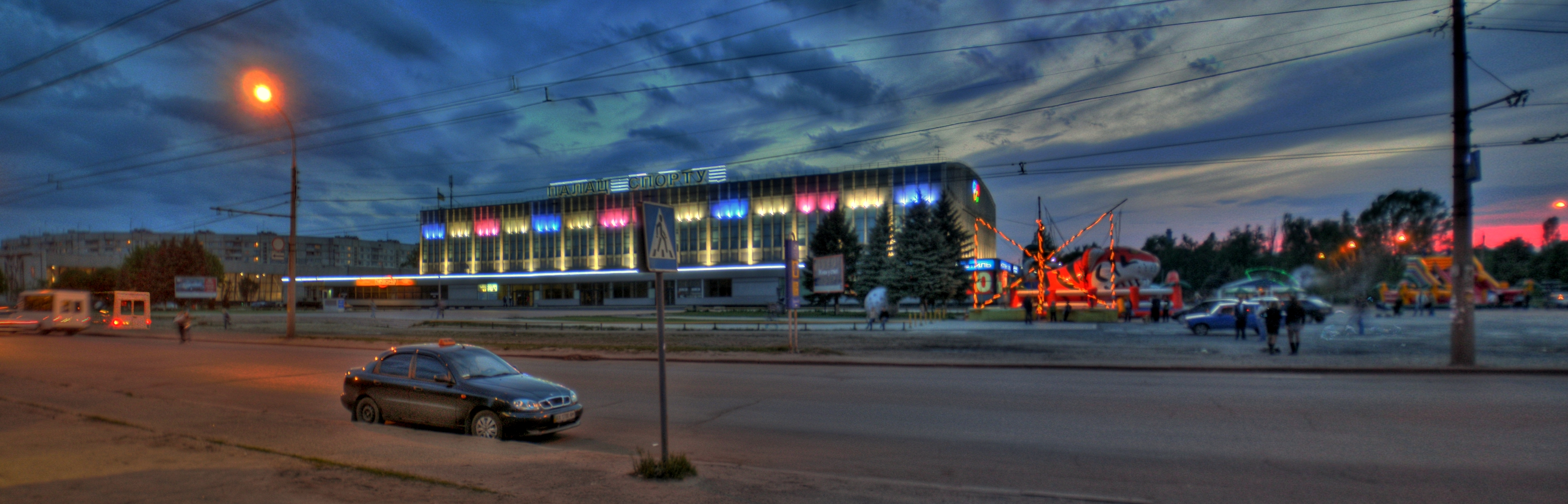
Kharkiv Palace of Sports

The district features three arts education schools with a total enrollment of 950 students: the School of Modern Theatre and Stage Arts, the K. I. Shulzhenko Children's Music School No. 12, and the Children's School of Arts No. 7. The local cultural infrastructure also includes two main libraries and six branch libraries, serving over 25,000 readers.

The district houses two sports schools, two swimming pools, and the Palace of Sports. The latter is the largest indoor sports arena in Ukraine and was partially destroyed by a Russian airstrike on September 1, 2024.

== Infrastructure and business ==
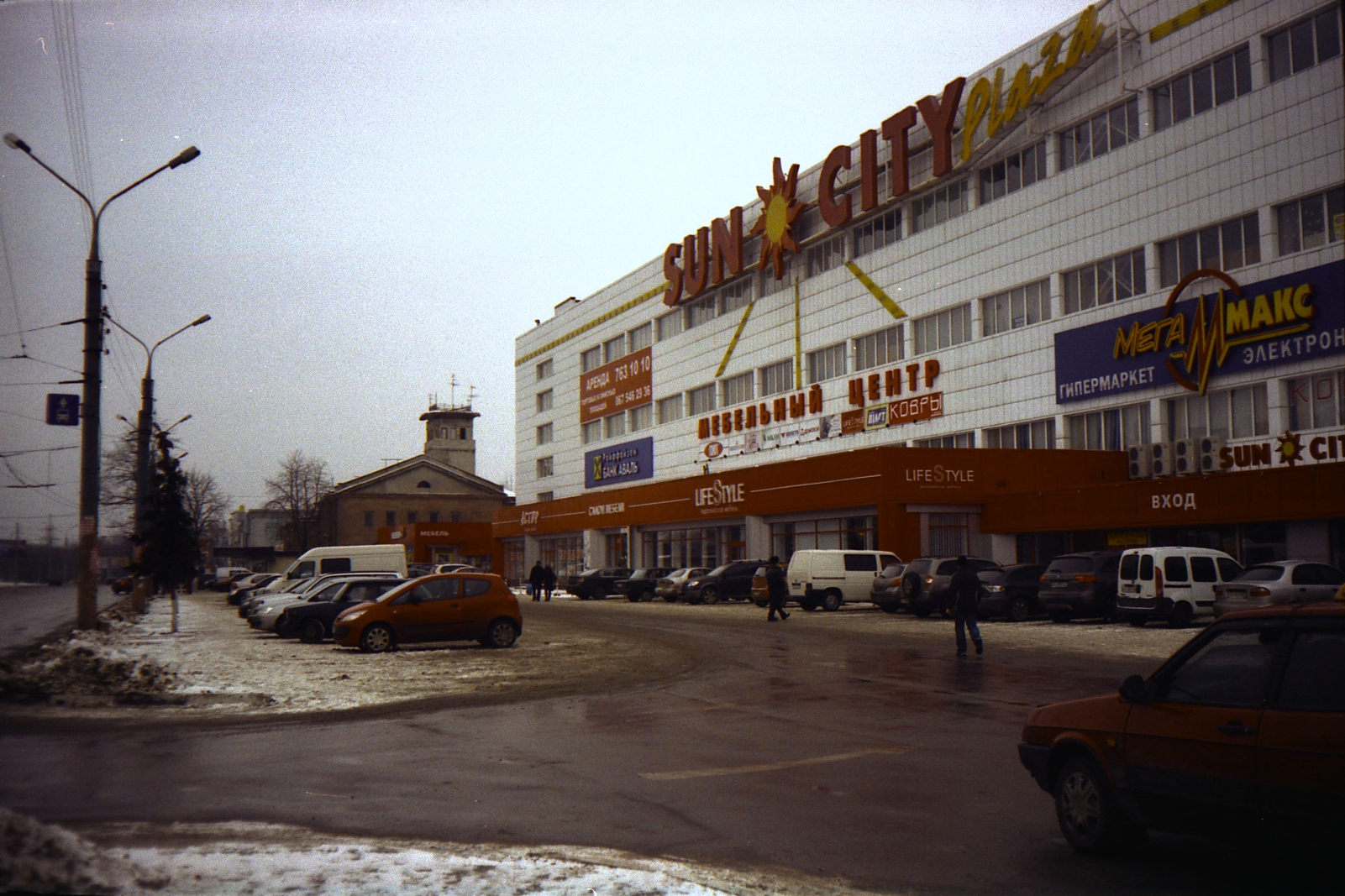
The Sun City shopping center located near the Turboatom metro station.

The district features 21 shopping centers and supermarkets. Infrastructure modernization projects are underway at four local marketplaces, focusing on upgrading material and technical facilities and replacing older stalls with modern architectural pavilions.

Economic activity in the district includes 4,682 registered enterprises, organizations, and institutions, alongside 10,191 sole proprietorships. Additionally, 4,811 citizens are employed by individual entrepreneurs.

== Health care ==
On the territory of the district work:

- city polyclinics No. 3 and 5;
- children's city polyclinic No. 15;
- dental polyclinic No. 3;
- two women's consultations;
- two outpatient clinics of family medicine.

On the territory of the district there is a unique institution of its kind in Ukraine - a medical complex.

== Places ==
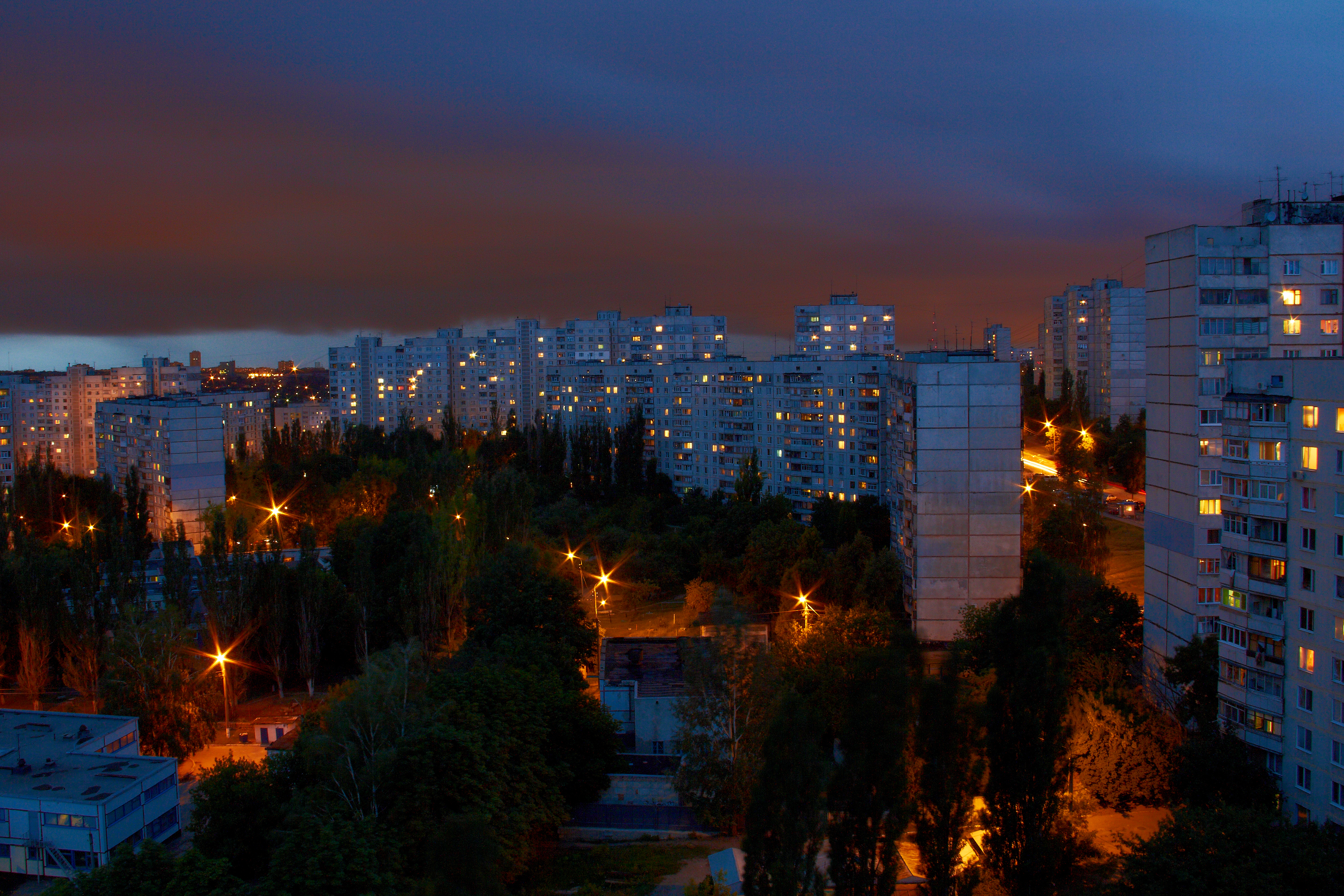
Saltivsky residential massif in Nemyshlianskyi District

- Nemyshlia
- Horbany
- Pavlenky
- Fedortsi
- Novo-Zakhidnyi
- Saltivka: Druhe Saltivske selyshche, Tretye Saltivske selyshche,
- micro-districts: 624, 625, 626, 627

== Gallery ==
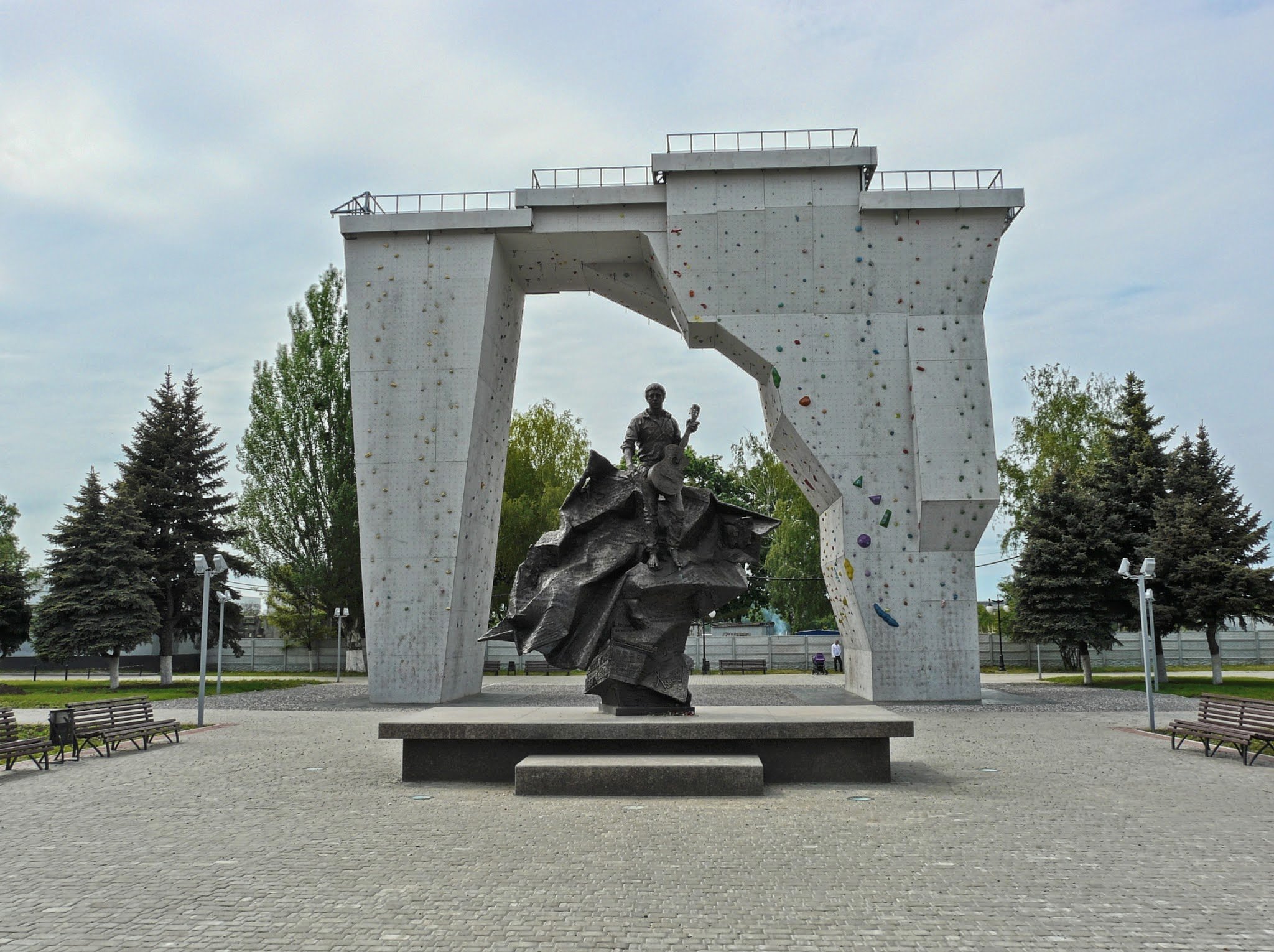
Monument to Vladimir Vysotsky

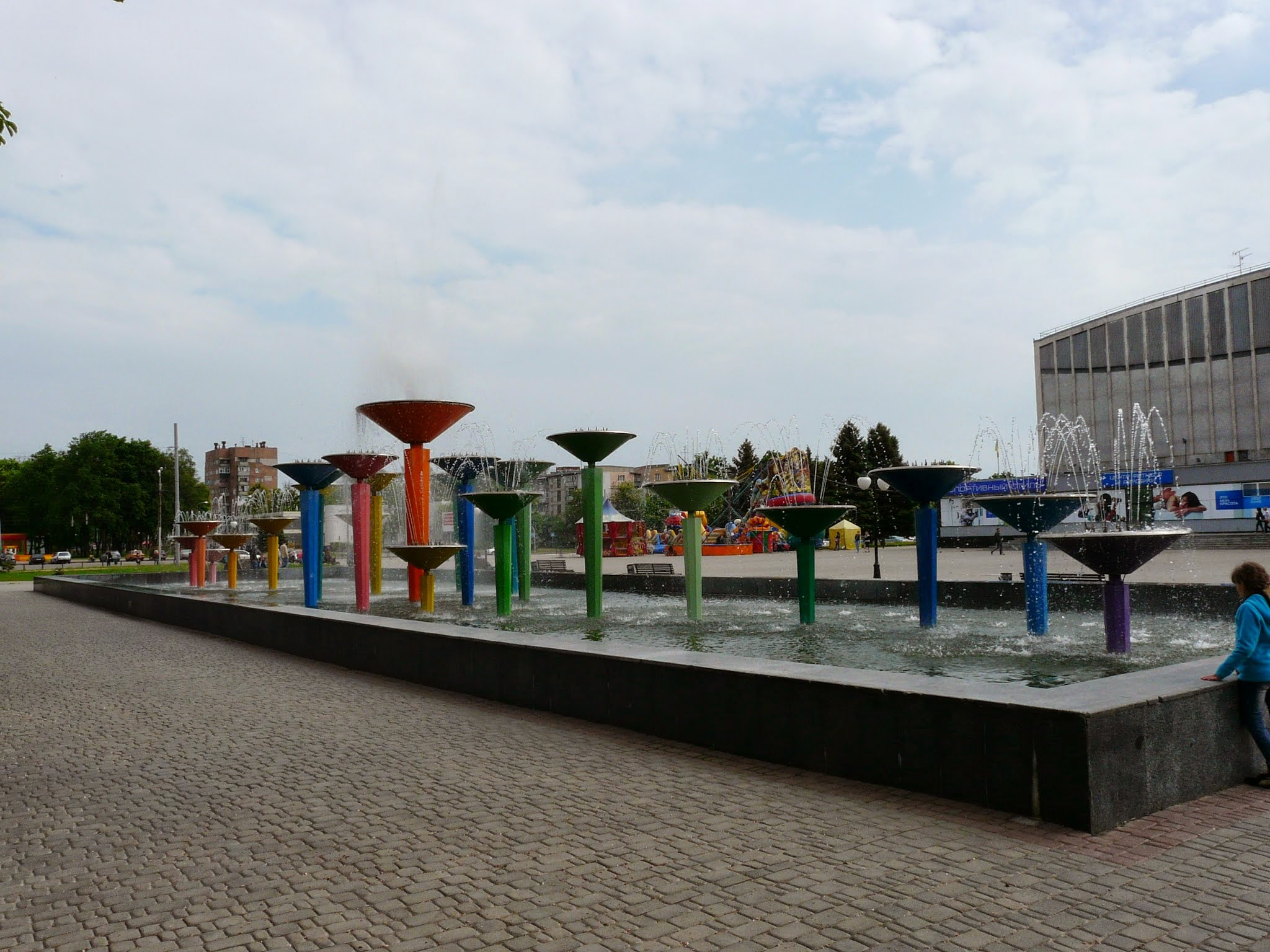
Fountain near the Palace of Sports

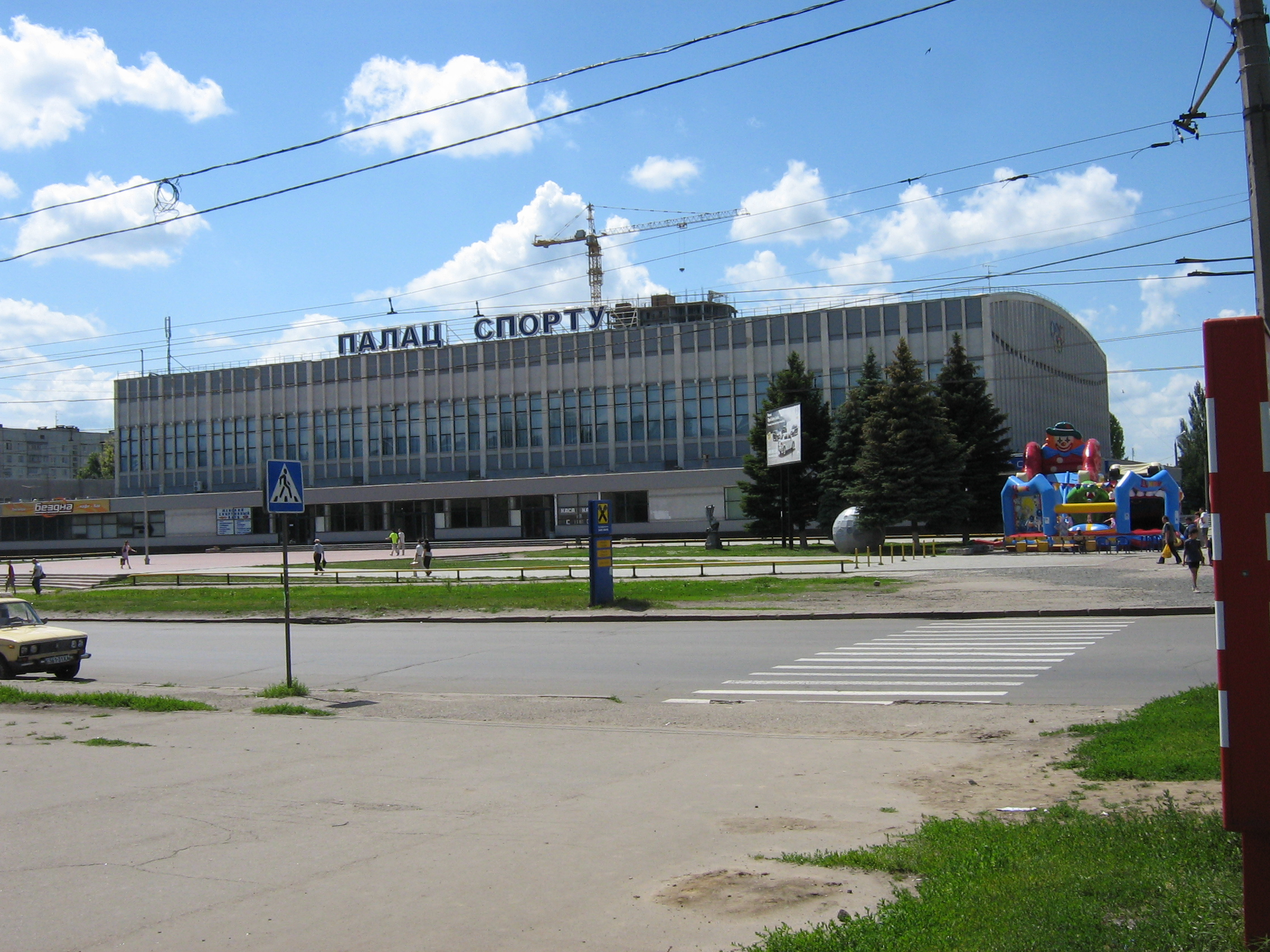
Kharkiv Palace of Sports

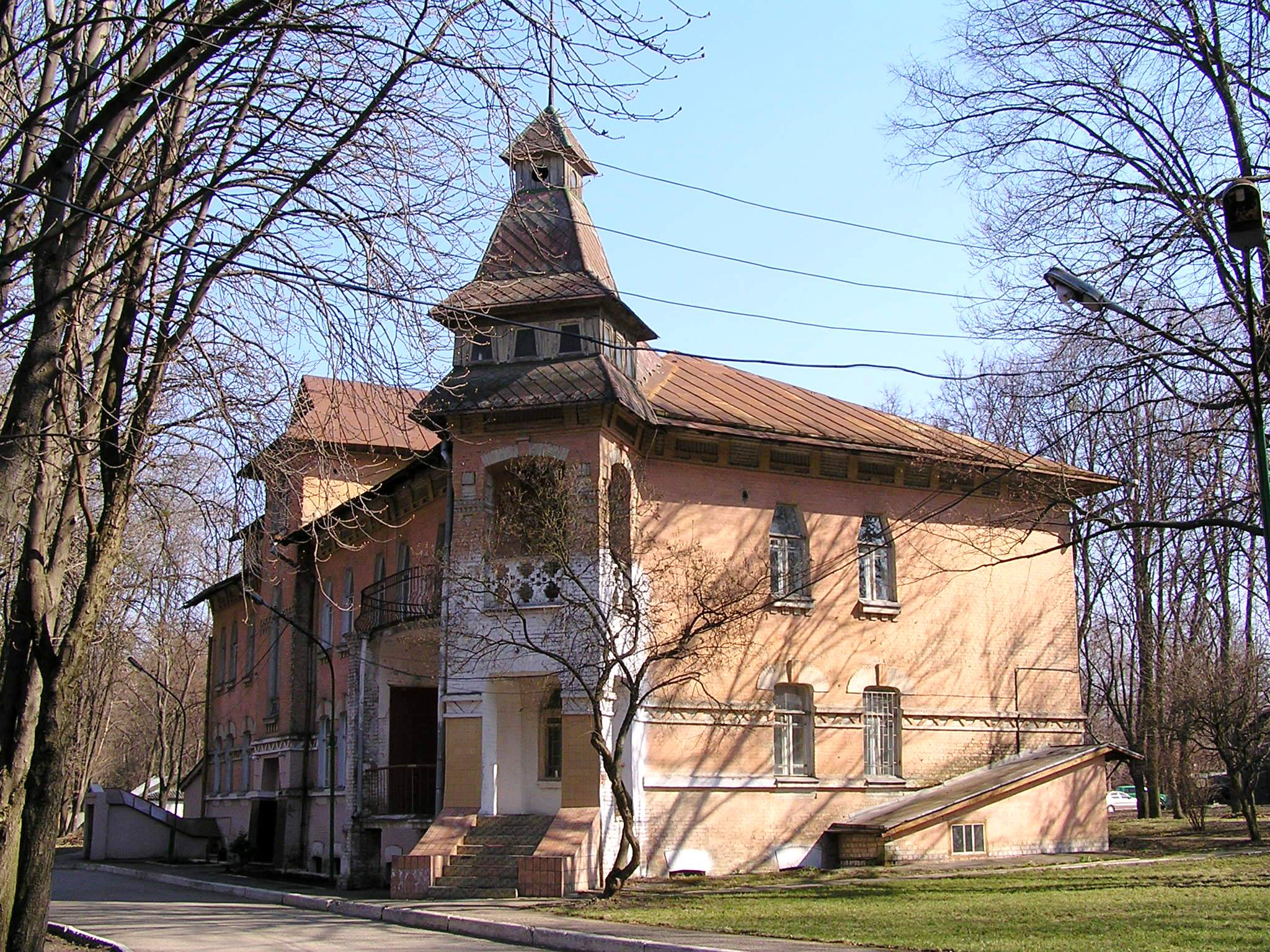
One of the buildings of the Kharkiv Breeding Station

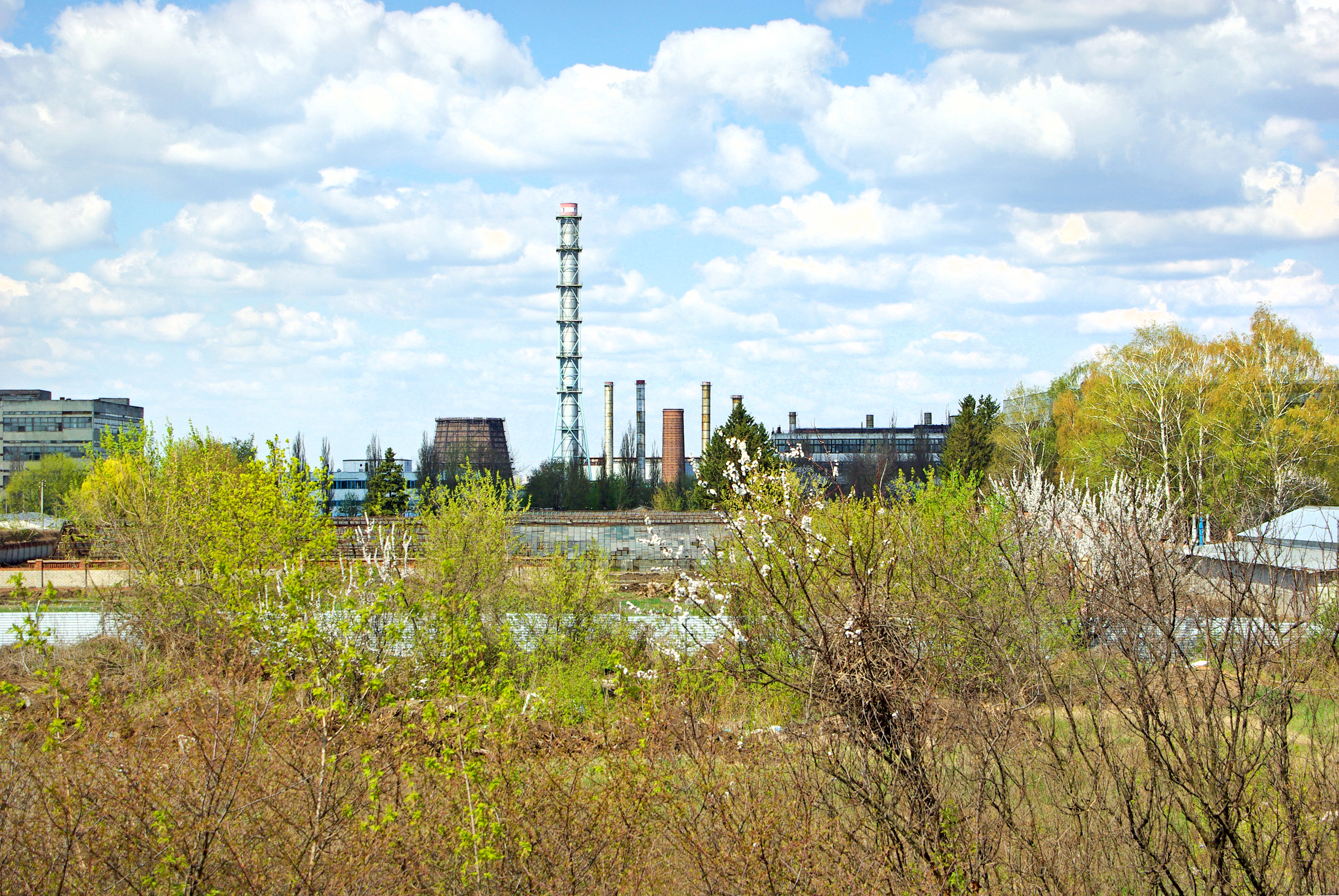
View of the Turboatom plant

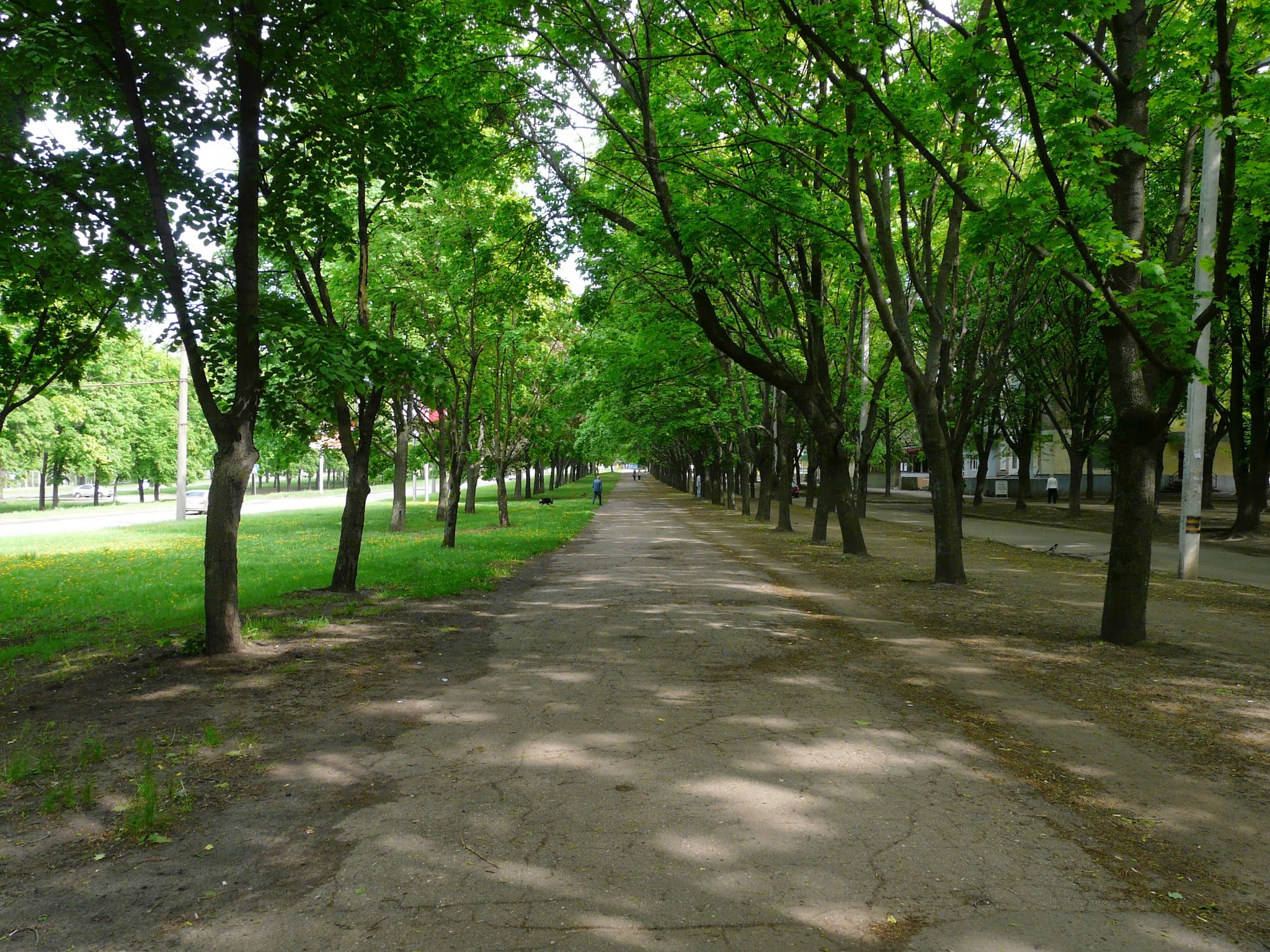
The Novi Doma residential area

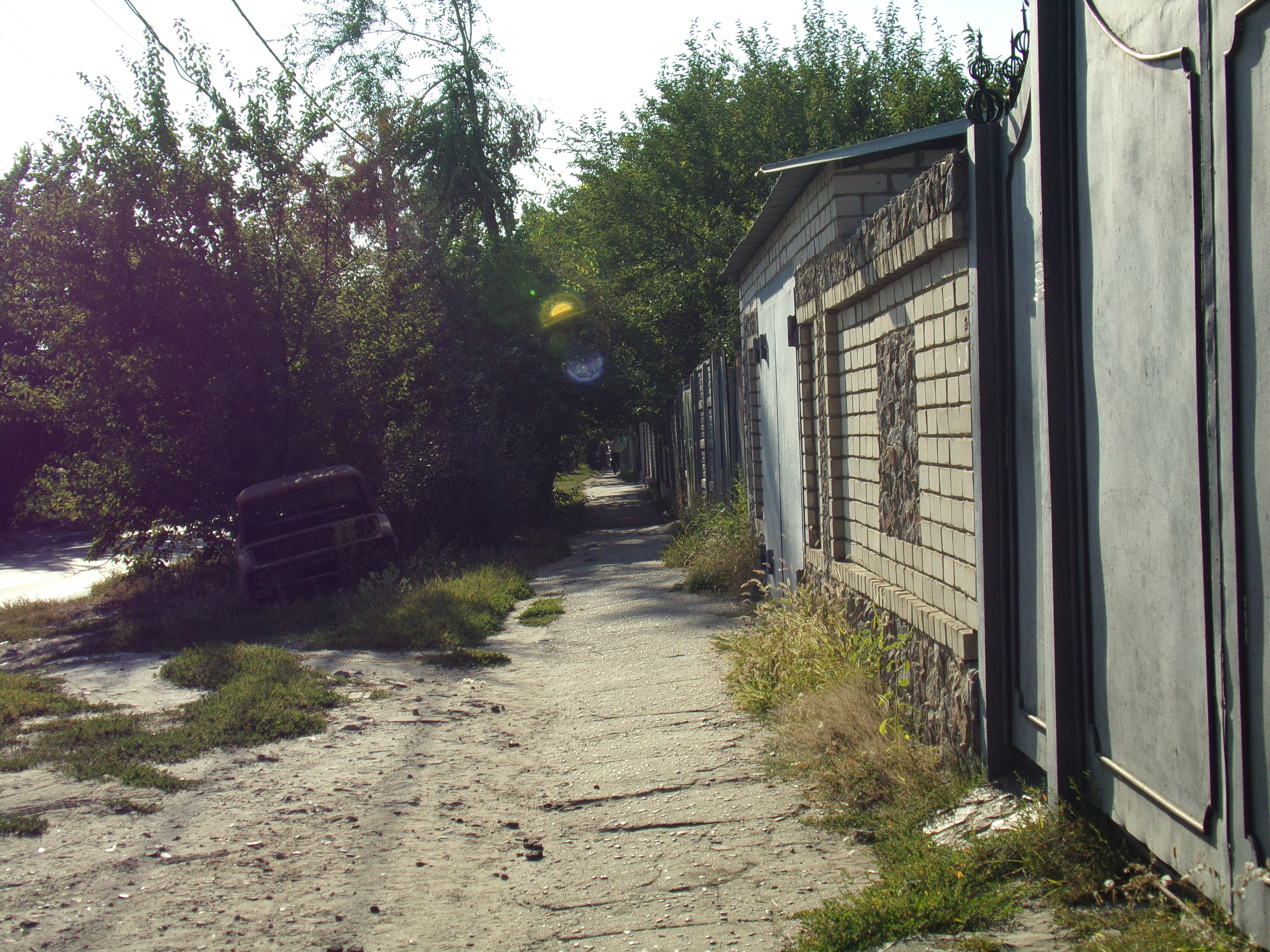
Tretye Saltivske selyshche

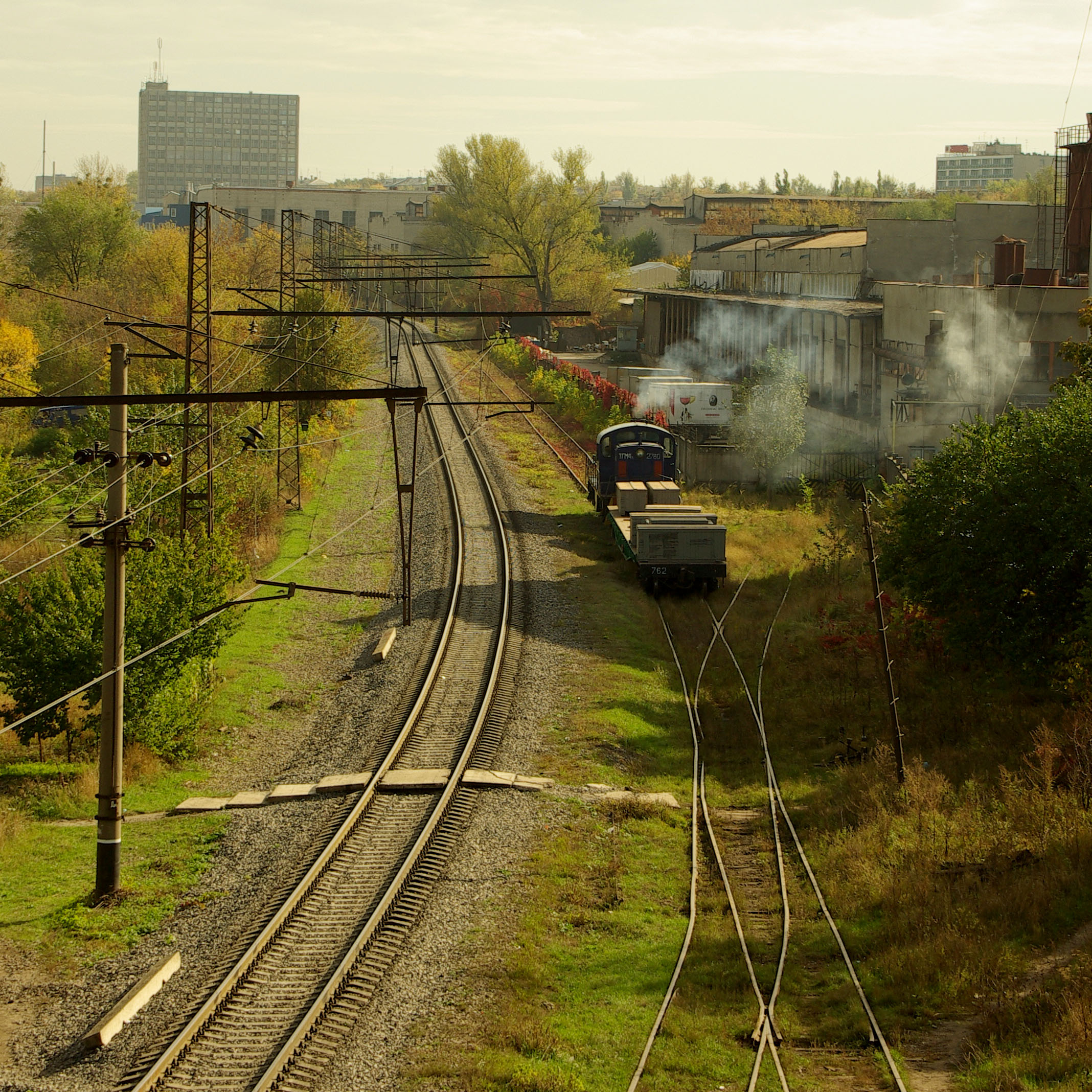
Railway tracks near Lva Landau Avenue

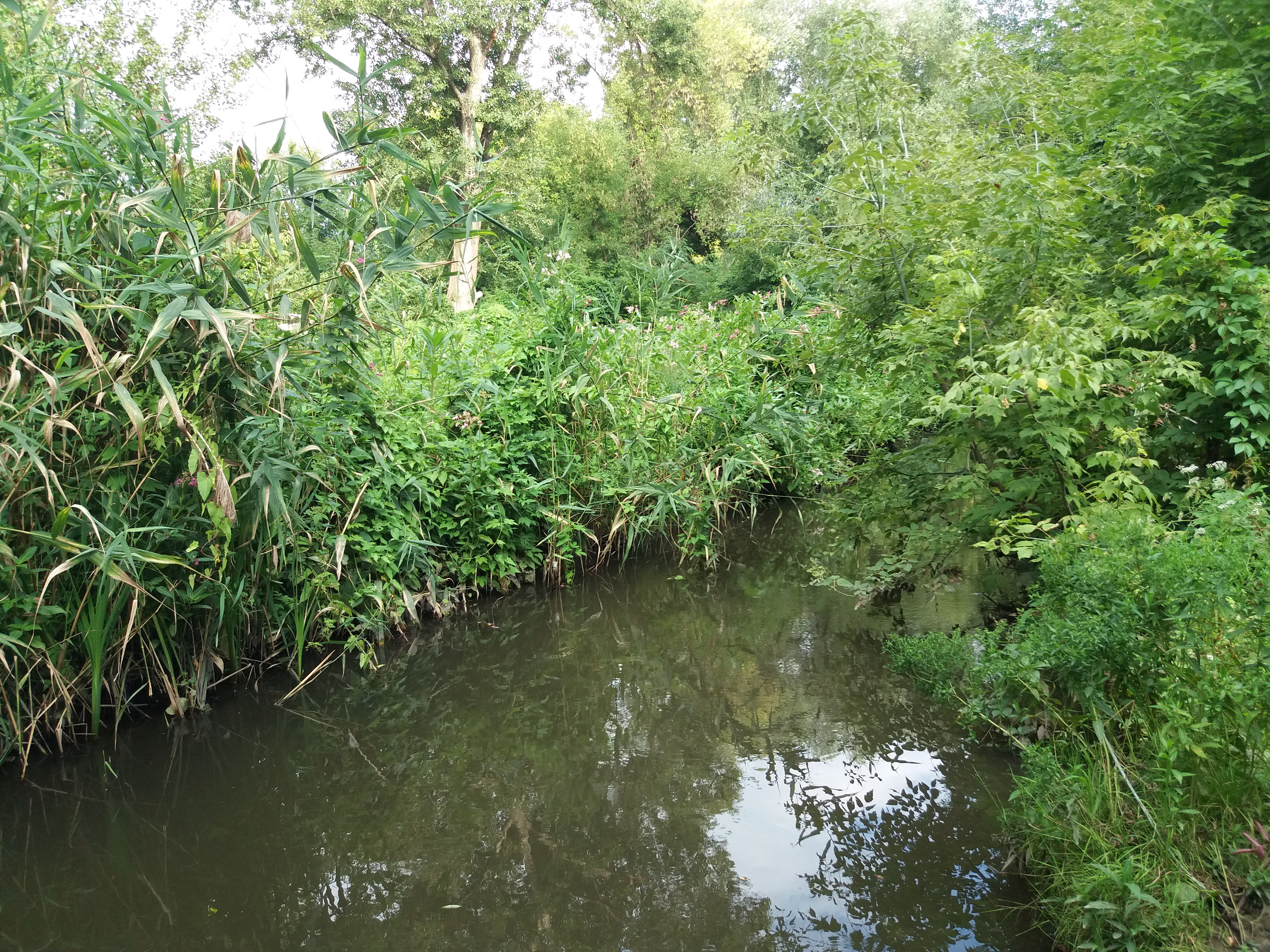
Nemyshlya River
