= Soviet ship Frunze =

Three ships of the Soviet Navy have been named for the Bolshevik leader Mikhail Vasilyevich Frunze.

- Russian battleship Frunze (1911), a Gangut-class battleship originally named Poltava
- Soviet cruiser Frunze (1939), a Chapayev-class cruiser
- Russian battlecruiser Admiral Lazarev, named Frunze until 1992, a Kirov-class missile cruiser subsequently named Admiral Lazarev
