= Imeni Frunze =

Imeni Frunze (Russian: и́мени Фру́нзе, lit. named after Frunze) is the name of several rural localities in Russia:

- imeni Frunze, Altai Krai, a settlement in Ust-Kazhinsky Selsoviet of Krasnogorsky District in Altai Krai; 52°35′N 86°20′E
- imeni Frunze, Vladimir Oblast, a settlement in Kameshkovsky District of Vladimir Oblast
