= AEBI =

Swiss multinational company

Aebi Schmidt Group
- Type: Private
- Industry: Agricultural machinery; Heavy equipment
- Founded: 1883; 143 years ago Burgdorf, Switzerland
- Founder: Johann Ulrich Aebi
- Headquarters: Burgdorf, Switzerland
- Number of locations: 16 (2023)
- Key people: Peter Spuhler (Chairman); Barend Fruithof (CEO)
- Owner: Peter Spuhler
- Number of employees: 3,000+ (2023)
- Parent: Aebi Schmidt Holding Ltd.
- Website: aebi-schmidt.com

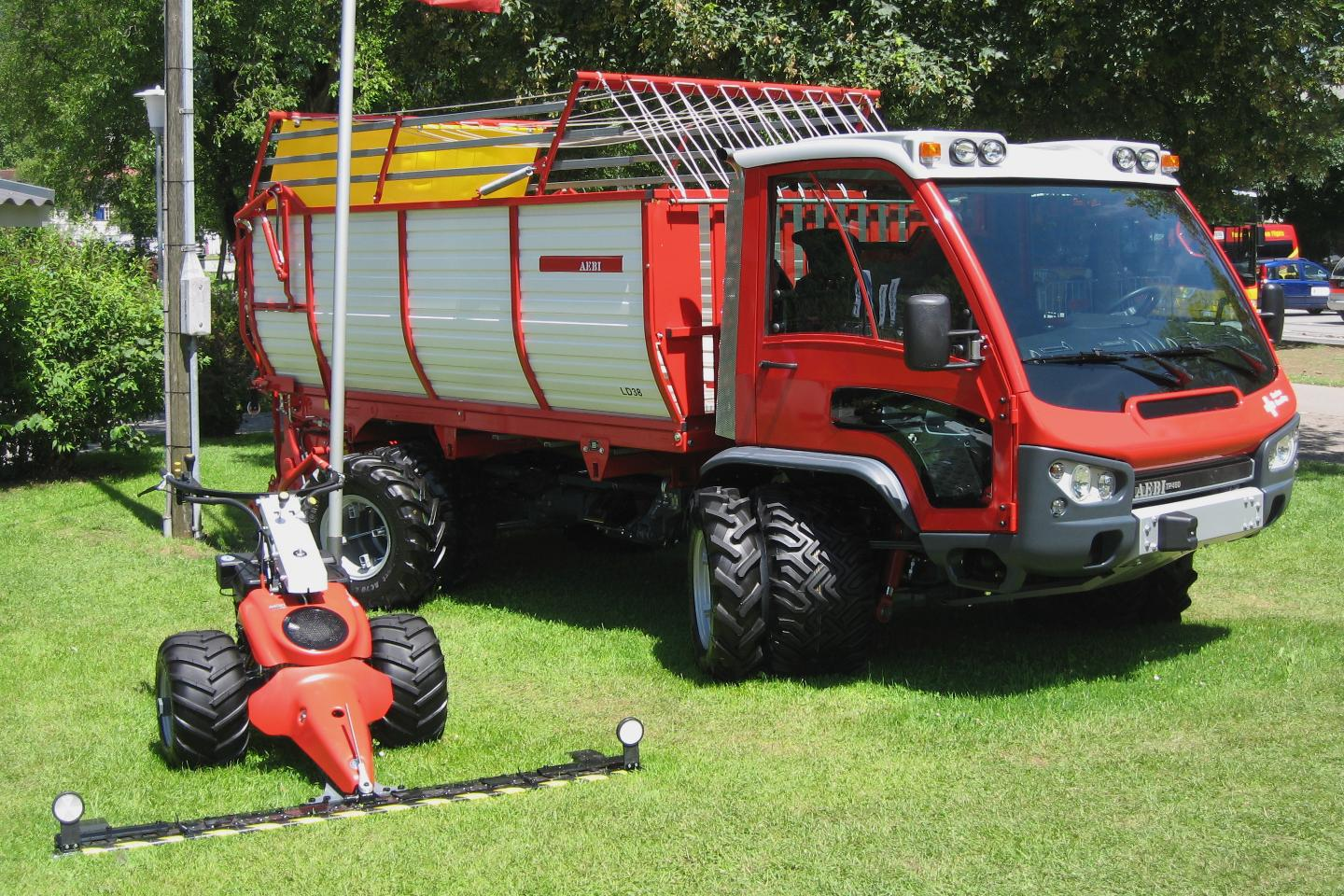
AEBI multipurpose transporter and mover

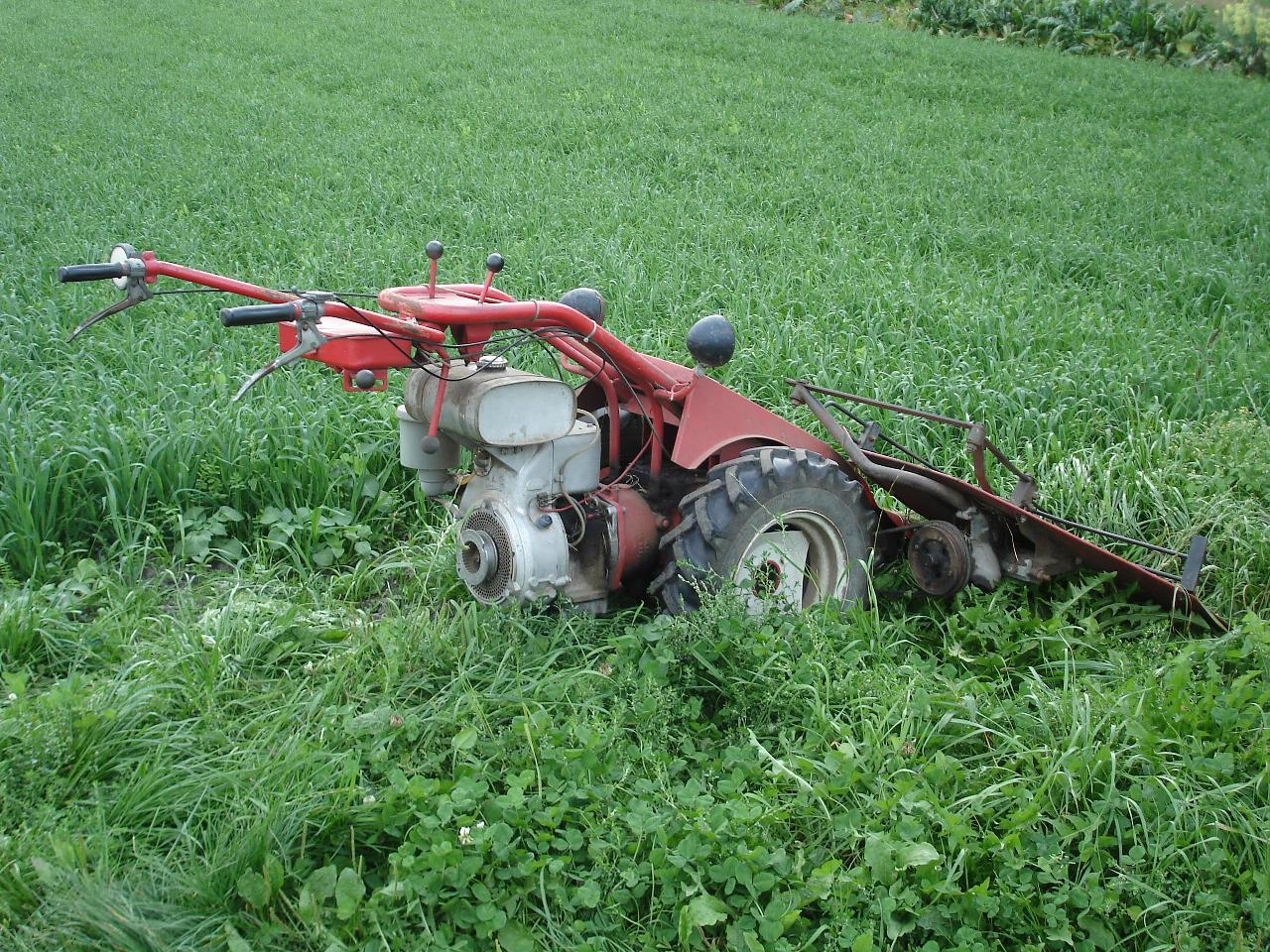
AEBI motor mover AM 40

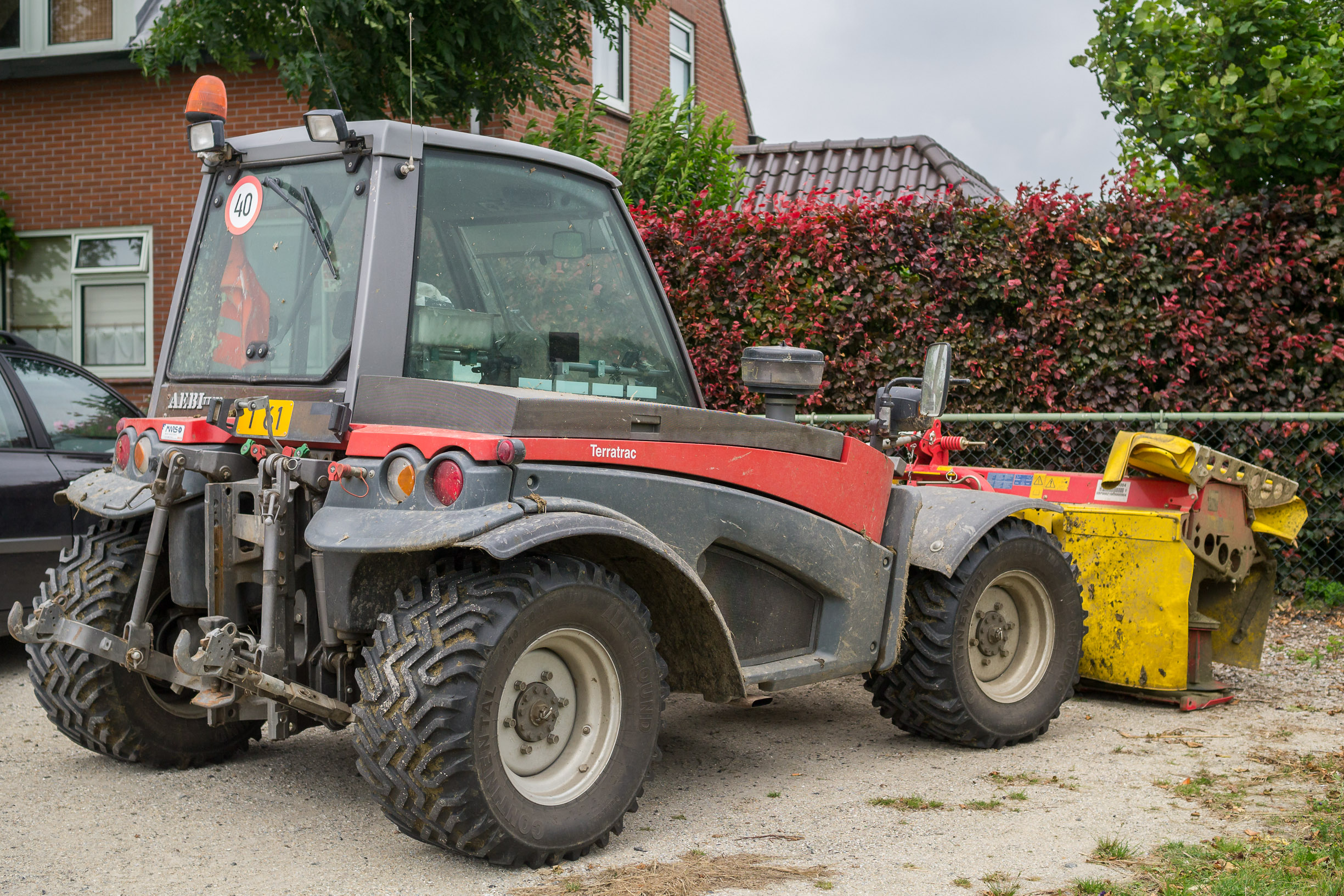
Aebi Terratrac tractor

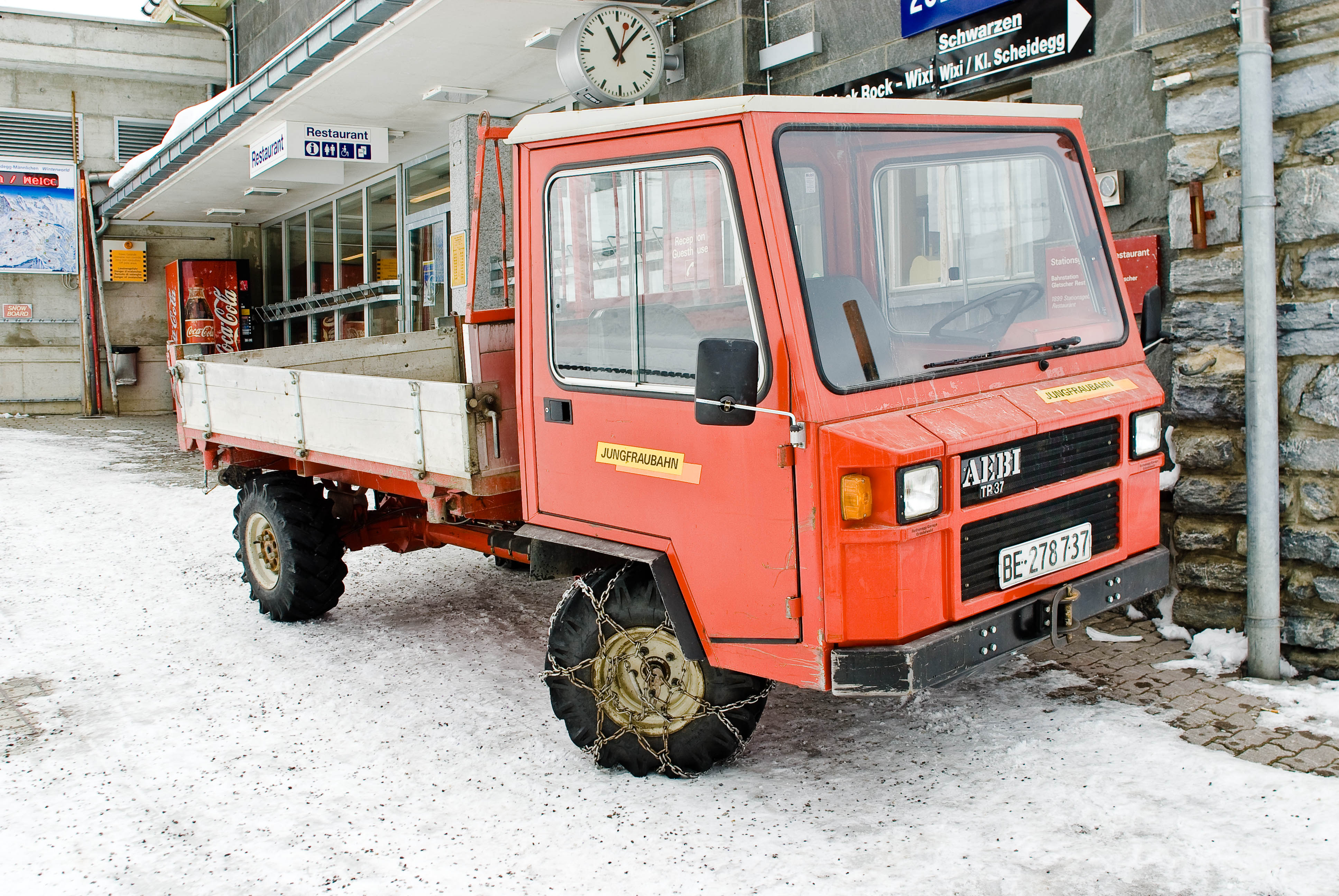
Aebi TP37

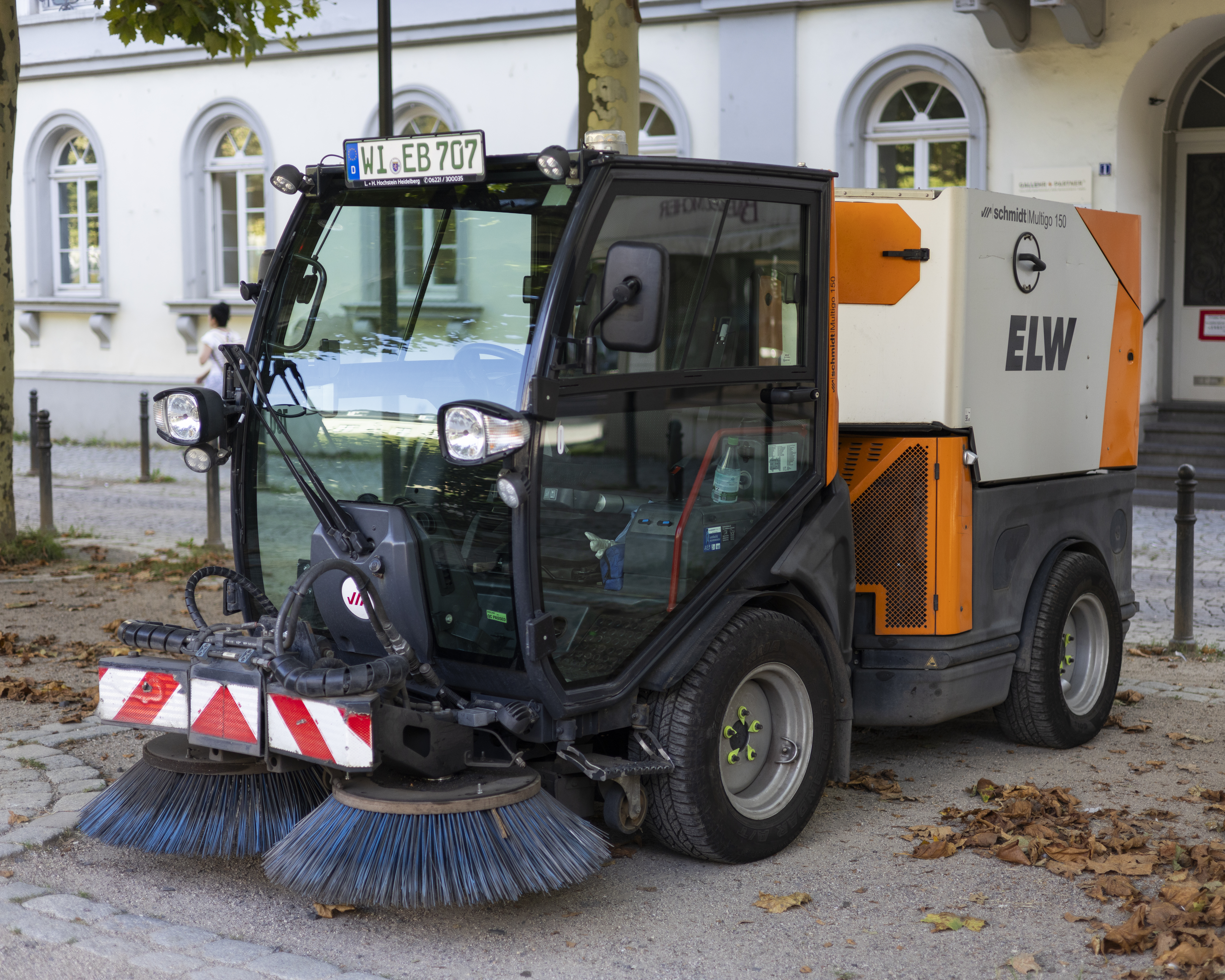
A Schmidt Multigo 150 street-sweeping vehicle operated by ELW in Wiesbaden, Germany

Aebi Schmidt Group is a Swiss multinational company that manufactures agricultural machinery, heavy equipment as well as municipal equipment. The company's products include transporters, Implement carriers, road sweepers, tractors, and mowers to be used in municipal maintenance of roads.

Founded in 1883, it is currently majority owned by Peter Spuhler, who is a controlling shareholder of Aebi Schmidt Holding Ltd with 56,2%. The group currently has 3,000+ associates worldwide and operates 16 manufacturing facilities in Switzerland, Germany, Netherlands, Poland, Finland, Canada and the United States.

== History ==
- 1883: In Burgdorf, Switzerland, Johann Ulrich Aebi established a workshop for manufacturing turbines and sprayers
- 1894: Workshop held on development of an industrial enterprise with production
- 1895: Aebi builds starts the production of a replica of McCormick's reaper
- 1910: Production of threshing equipment, feed elevators, and forceps begins
- 1915: Experimental use of a 4-wheel Mähtraktors
- 1928: Launch of a modernization campaign in workshop and machinery
- 1929: Production of 3-wheel Mähtraktors
- 1931: Approximately 40,000-"Helvetia" mowers were sold
- 1932: Production of the world's first ball-reaper begins
- 1942: Takeover of the company Stadler AG; total workforce: 270; turnover: 5.8 million Swiss francs
- 1950: Launch of the first motor mower: the Aebi AM 50
- 1954: Production of the first-Aebi Einachstraktors with Triebachsanhänger
- 1964: The first Aebi transporter is presented
- 1971: Production of snowblowers begins for municipal and winter use
- 1976: Development of the Terratrac DD 77, a hangtauglichem Zweiachsmäher
- 1981: Founding of the Aebi vehicles and machinery in Kematen GmbH (Austria)
- 1986: Presentation of the TT 88 with hydrostatic drive
- 1995: Founding of Aebi France S.à.r.l. in Genas, France
- 1998: Founding of North America Inc. Aebi in Richmond, Virginia, USA; Nussmüller acquisition of land and municipal engineering Schwanberg GmbH (Austria)
- 1999: Takeover of the company MFH AG, Maschinenfabrik in Hochdorf, Switzerland
- 2006: The Aebi Holding AG is represented by a group led by entrepreneur Peter Spuhler
