= Trams in Kharkiv =

Electric tram system in Kharkiv, Ukraine

Kharkiv Tramline
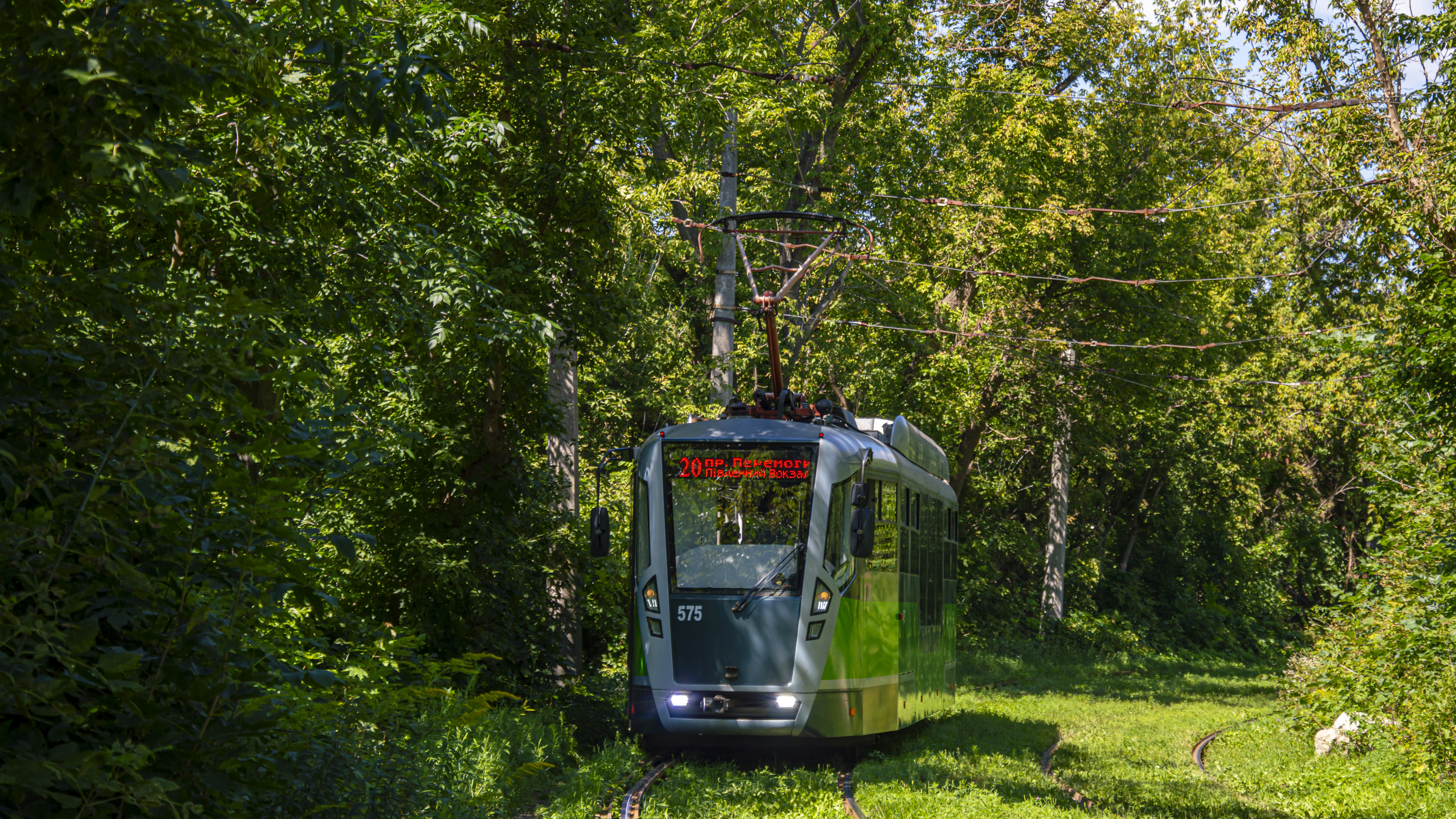

Overview
- Native name: Харківський трамвай
- Owner: City of Kharkiv
- Area served: List: Kholodnohirskyi District; Shevchenkivskyi District; Kyivskyi District; Saltivskyi District; Nemyshlyanskyi District; Industrialnyi District; Slobidskyi District; Osnovianskyi District; Novobavarskyi District
- Locale: Kharkiv, Ukraine
- Number of lines: 12
- Annual ridership: 103,818,300 (2016)
- Website: http://gortransport.kharkov.ua

Operation
- Began operation: September 24, 1882 (horse-drawn tram); July 3, 1906 (electric tram)
- Operators: KP Miskelektrotransservis; KP Saltivske tramvaine depo
- Number of vehicles: 276

Technical
- System length: 217.6 km (135.2 mi) (2017)
- Track gauge: 1,524 mm (5 ft) (1,520 mm (4 ft 11 27/32 in) Russian gauge)
System map
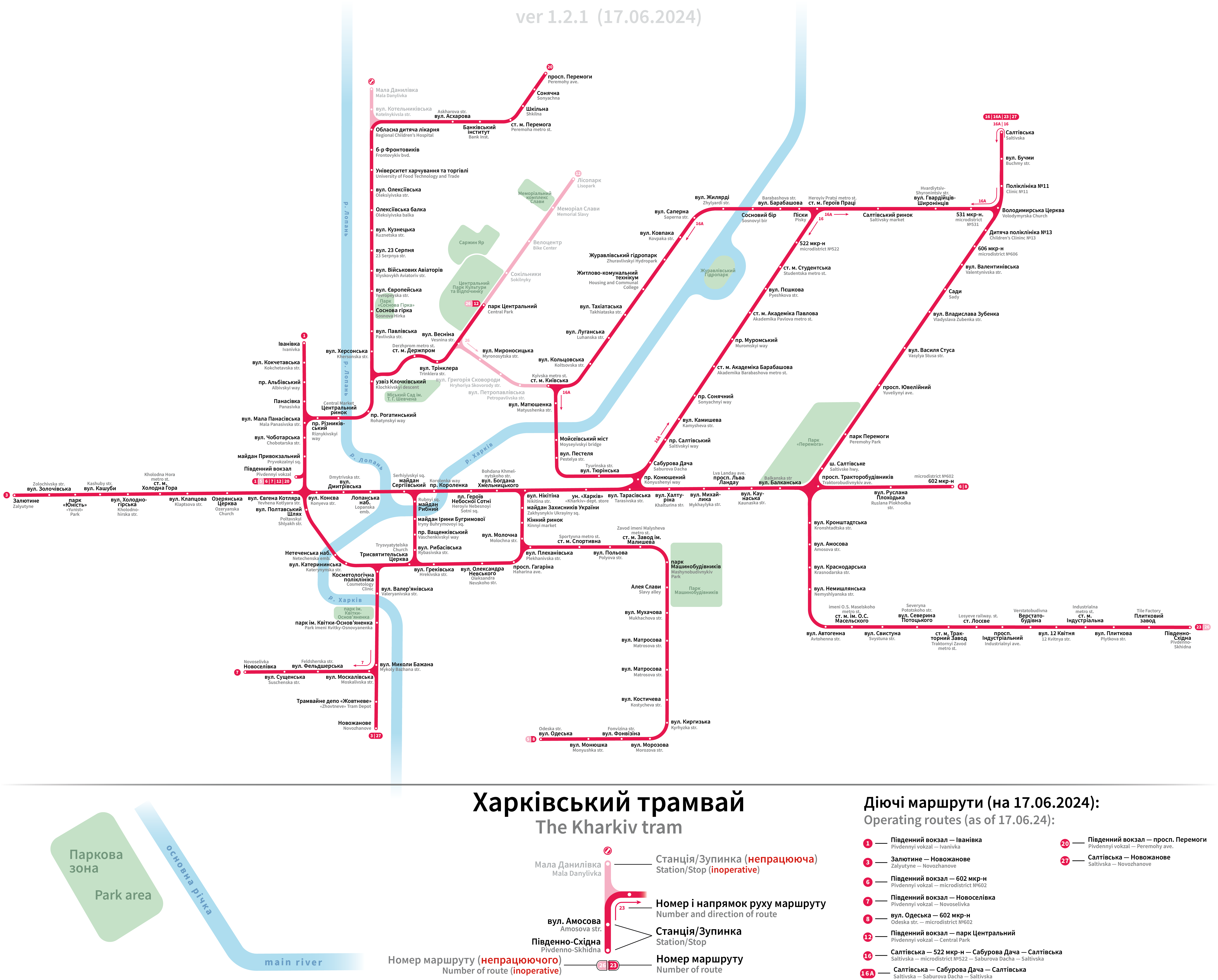

The Kharkiv tram (Ukrainian: Харкiвський трамвай) is part of the public transport system of the second largest city of Ukraine. The tram system has a "Russian Standard" track gauge of 1,524 mm (5 ft). The tram network is built almost exclusively on the streets of Kharkiv, making it a traditional tram system. The network consists almost exclusively of double track. In most parts the tracks are separated from other road traffic, whereas elsewhere tracks lie on lanes that cars and buses may also use.

== History ==
=== Horse-drawn tram ===
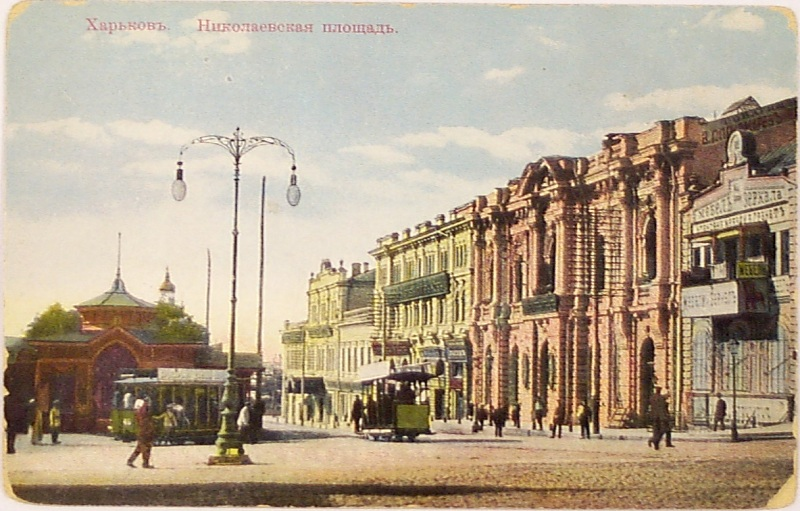
Horse-drawn tram on Mykolayivska Square

Beginning in 1871, people and companies began to apply to the Kharkov Duma with projects for the construction of a horse-drawn tram in Kharkiv. On March 2, 1881, French businessmen P.-K. Bonnie and E. Otlie appealed to the Duma with their rationale for the construction of a horse-drawn railway in Kharkiv, which was accepted. On May 31, 1882, a contract was signed with them for the construction of a road for passenger and goods traffic with a length of 17.5 versts. The first horse railway line was built on September 12, 1882 and belonged to a private Belgian company. The first route was from the station of the Azov-Kursk Railway (now the Kharkiv railway station) to the stock exchange on Mykolayivska Square. Over time, 3 tram lines were opened in the city center.

The fare was set at 5 kopecks per passenger for the entire journey with an additional charge of 2 kopecks in case of transfer to another line. The horse-drawn tram worked an average of 14–15 hours a day: from 07:00 to 23:00 in summer (until 22:00 in winter).

The first horse depot was built in 1885. On September 16, 1917, the City Duma considered the issue of stopping the horse-drawn tram. On March 23, 1919, the horse tram ceased to exist.

In July 1920, horse-drawn tram service was temporarily resumed on the section from the station to Rosa Luxemburg Square. But already in June 1921, this line was electrified — an electric tram began to run along it. In November 1922, the line on Moskalyovka was electrified, and in October 1923, the line along 1 Travnia and Staro-Moskovska Streets to the Chervonozavod Theater was electrified. The routes of the horse-drawn tram along Sumsky and Kinnaya Streets were canceled, and the lines were dismantled. The carriages of the horse-drawn tram were operated until the end of the 20s of the 20th century - due to the lack of rolling stock, they were used as trailer carriages for the electric tram. But in connection with the transition of all tram lines to broad gauge at the end of the 20s, the narrow-gauge carriages of the former horse-drawn tram were finally scrapped.

=== Electric tram ===
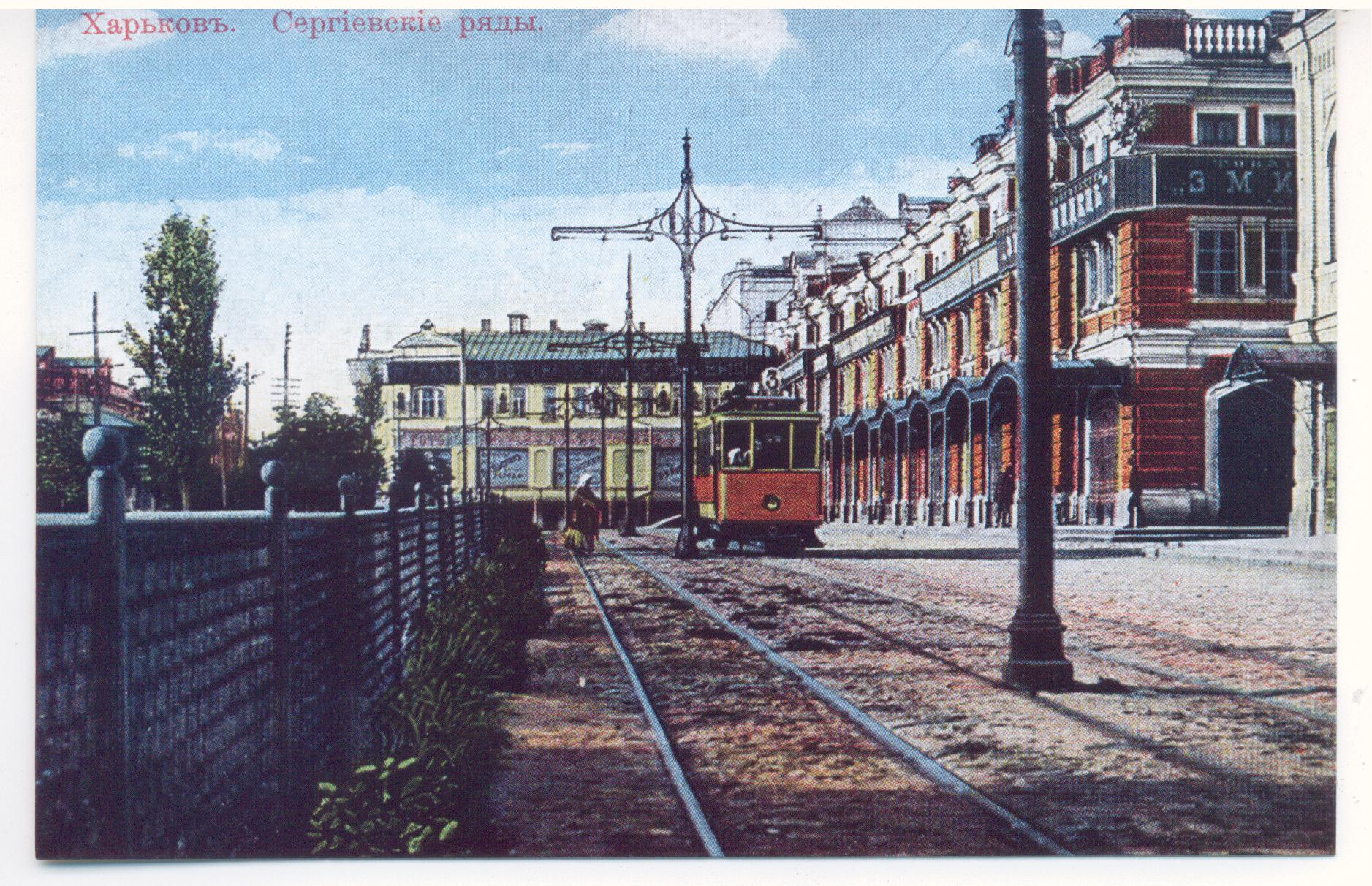
Tram on Serhievska Square

The first 12 carriages, in 1906, were built at MAN.

The track width was 1,000 mm (3 ft 3 3/8 in) (the current track width is 1,524 mm (5 ft)).

Electric tram service was launched on the following routes: "Pavlivskyi Maidan - Balashovskyi Vokzal" along the street. Petinsky (now Georgiya Tarasenko St.), St. Zmiivska (now Gagarina Ave.), str. Netechenska, prov. Podilskyi, prov. Kostyurinskyi (now part of Podilskyi Prov.). In the same year, the Petynsky tram park was built, which was located at the Craft School. From the very beginning, it belonged to the city and was exploited by the city authorities, which caused conflicts with a private Belgian horse. There were fights between hired people and workers who laid tram lines.

== Current times ==
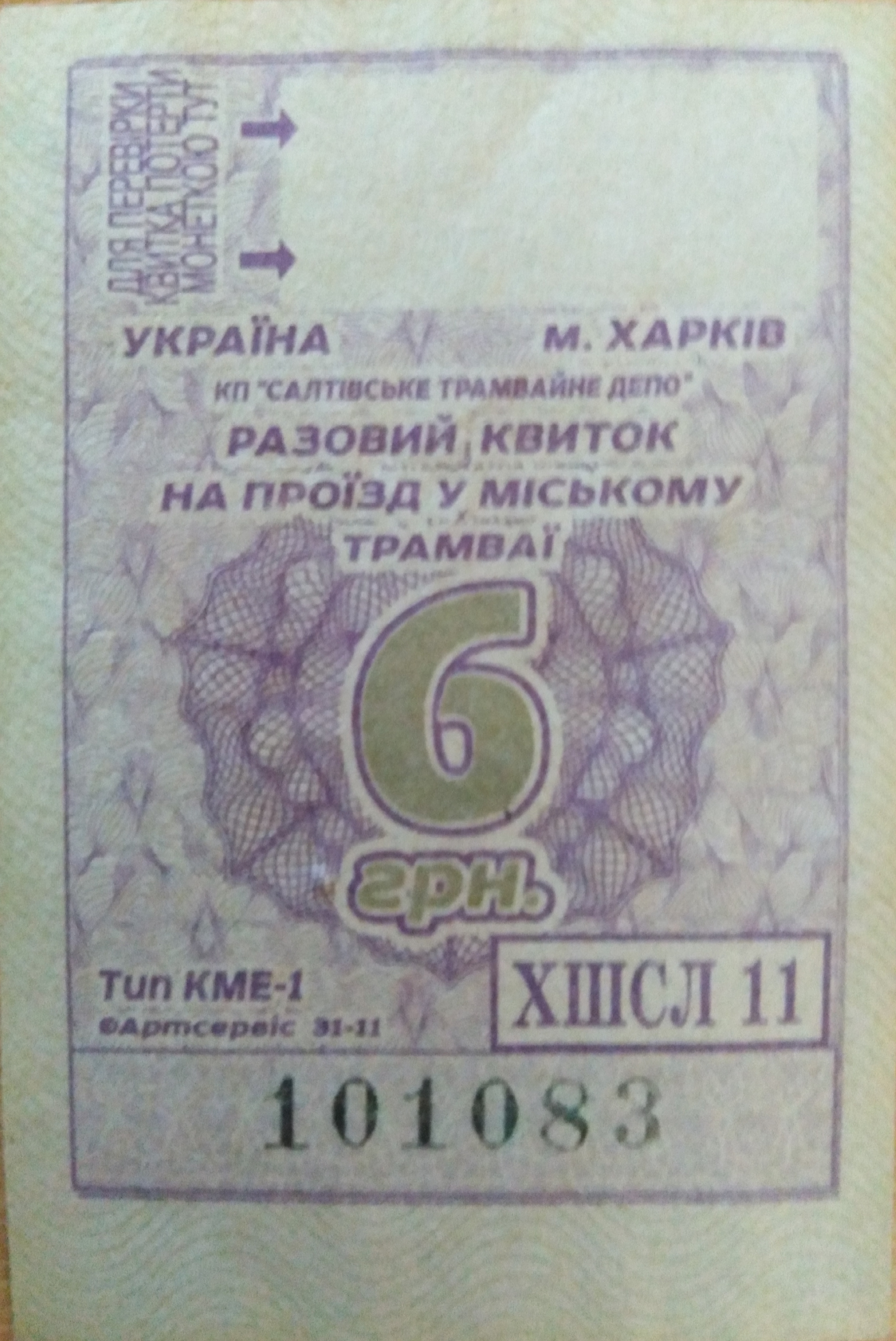
One-time ticket for travel in the city tram. The price is 6 hryvnias.

In October 2016, extensive sections of the track are in poor condition, even unsafe. Sleepers are rotten in parts, fishplates unbolted, pointwork derelict, some rails have sunk some 8 cm (3.1 in) below the road surface, overhead voltage supply is poorly regulated. Speeds are low.

In October 2018, the line beyond Children's Park was back in service, though the track is in poor condition, especially at the balloon loops at the terminus and Children's Park. The line through the city center - previously unused except for specials - now sees regular services, but the line from near Children's Park past the cemetery and down to the valley is not in service. The line to the station is in bad condition. A section between the station and the river has been rebuilt, apparently now omitting any connections to former car barns and/or workshops.

In October 2021 the Stadler Metelitsa tram was making test runs on the Kharkiv tram system. On 24 September 2021 acting mayor of Kharkiv Ihor Terekhov stated that his city's tram fleet would be completely renewed in four years.

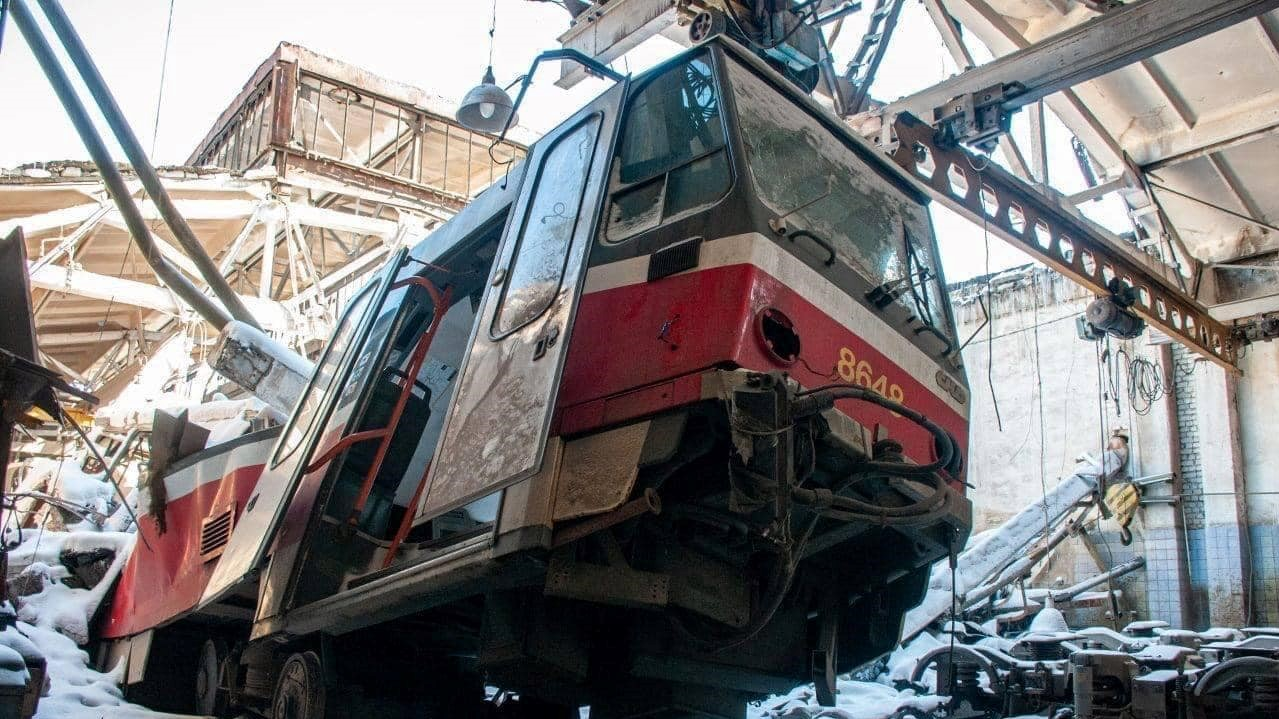
Tatra T6A5 destroyed by Russians in the bombardment of the Saltivka depot

Following the start of the ongoing Russian assault on Kharkiv since February 24, 2022 in the invasion of Ukraine all traffic has been suspended on February 28. The tram depot in Saltivka has been destroyed by Russian bombardment early in March. A number of European cities, including Brno, Ostrava and Prague, have donated surplus tram cars for restoration of the system.

On May 19, 2022, tram traffic was restored. Using the trams, as all transport in the city, is completely free.

== Rolling stock ==
The Kharkiv tram system uses many different tram cars and types, with most being manufactured by the ČKD Tatra company in Prague.

=== Current ===
Picture	Manufacturer	Model	Quantity	Since
	(Czech Republic) ČKD Tatra	T3SU (3 doors); T3SUCS; T3M; T3; T3A; T3R.P	89; 61; 15; 5; 30; 16	1976; 2011; 2011; 2012; 2013; 2023
	(Czech Republic) ČKD Tatra	T6A5	30	2017
	(Czech Republic) ČKD Tatra; KhVRZ	VPNP	3	2017

=== Historical ===
Picture	Manufacturer	Model	Quantity	Years
	(Germany) MAN	Unknown	12	1906–1930
	(Soviet Union) UKVZ	Kh	236	1927–1969
	(Soviet Union) UKVZ	KTM-1	49	1949–1974
	(Soviet Union) UKVZ	KTM-2	140	1961–1980
	(Soviet Union) RVR	MTV-82	49	1953–1977
	(Czech Republic) ČKD Tatra	K2SU	40	1970–1991
	(Soviet Union) UKVZ	KTM-5	136	1975–2002
	(Czech Republic) ČKD Tatra	T6B5SU	22	1988–2023
	UKVZ	71-619	9	2007-2022
	(Czech Republic) ČKD Tatra; KhVRZ	T3VPA	3	2009–2022
	(Switzerland) (Belarus) Stadler	Metelitsa	1	2021–2024

=== Service rolling stock ===
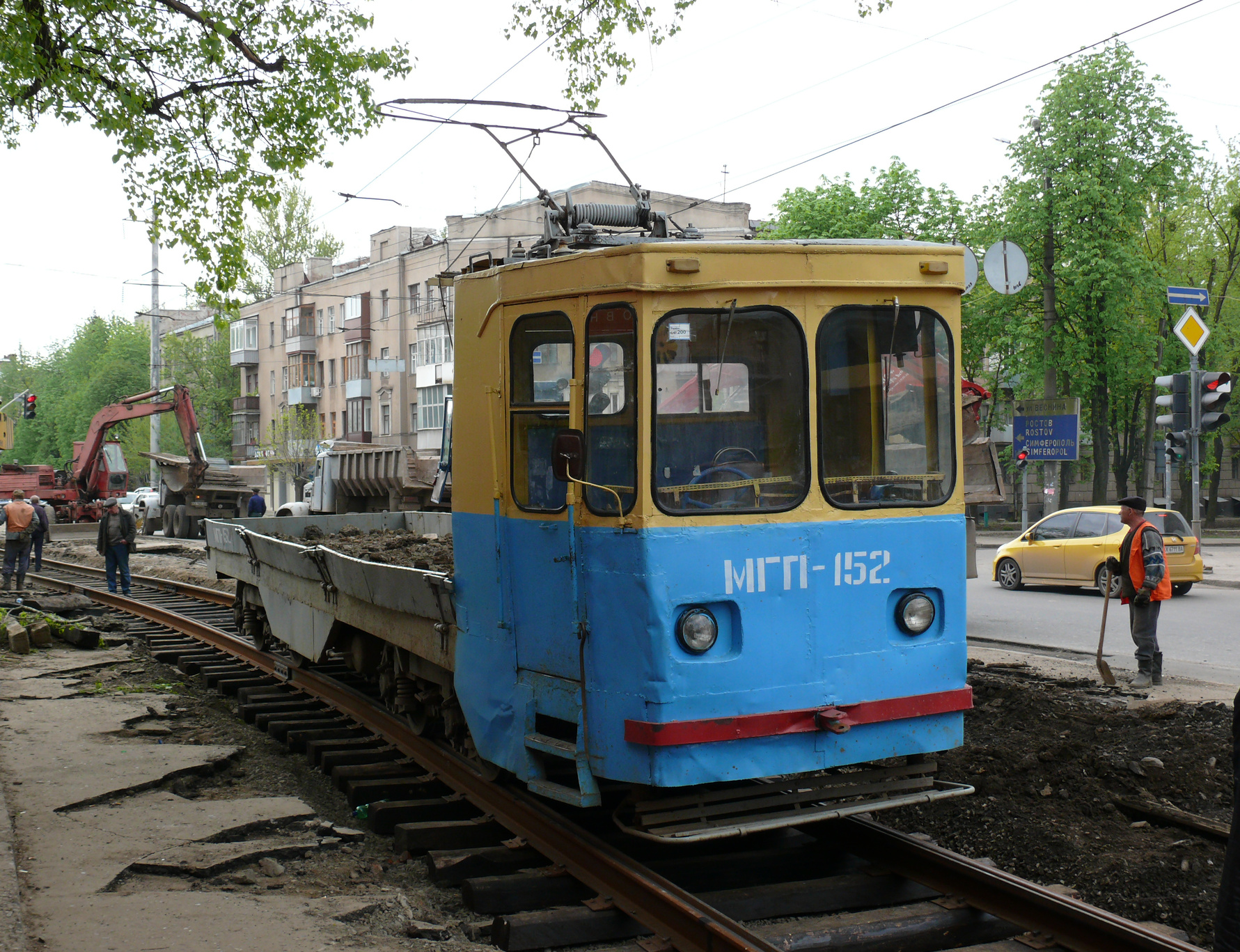
MGP-152 motorized cargo platform

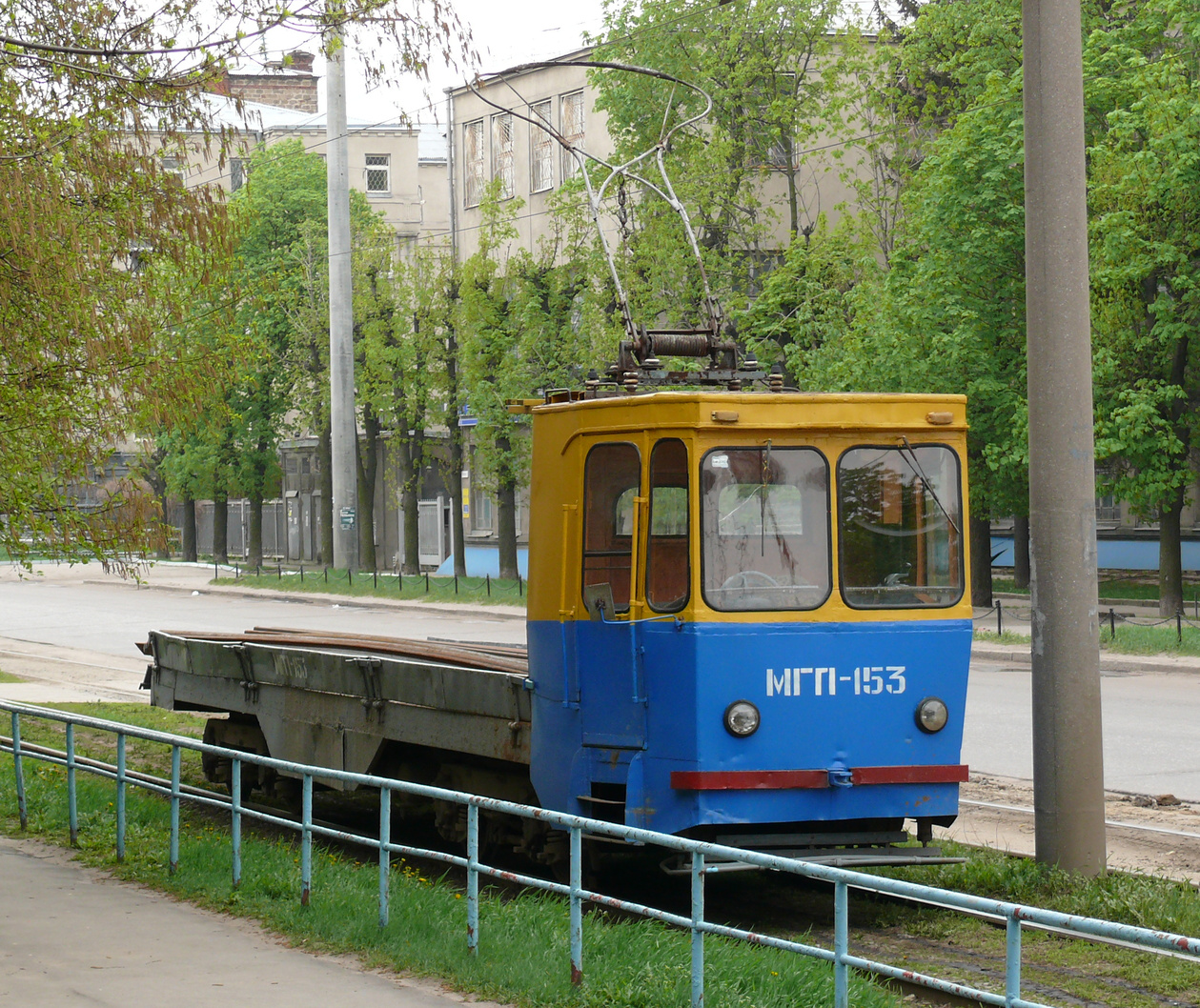
MGP-153 motorized cargo platform

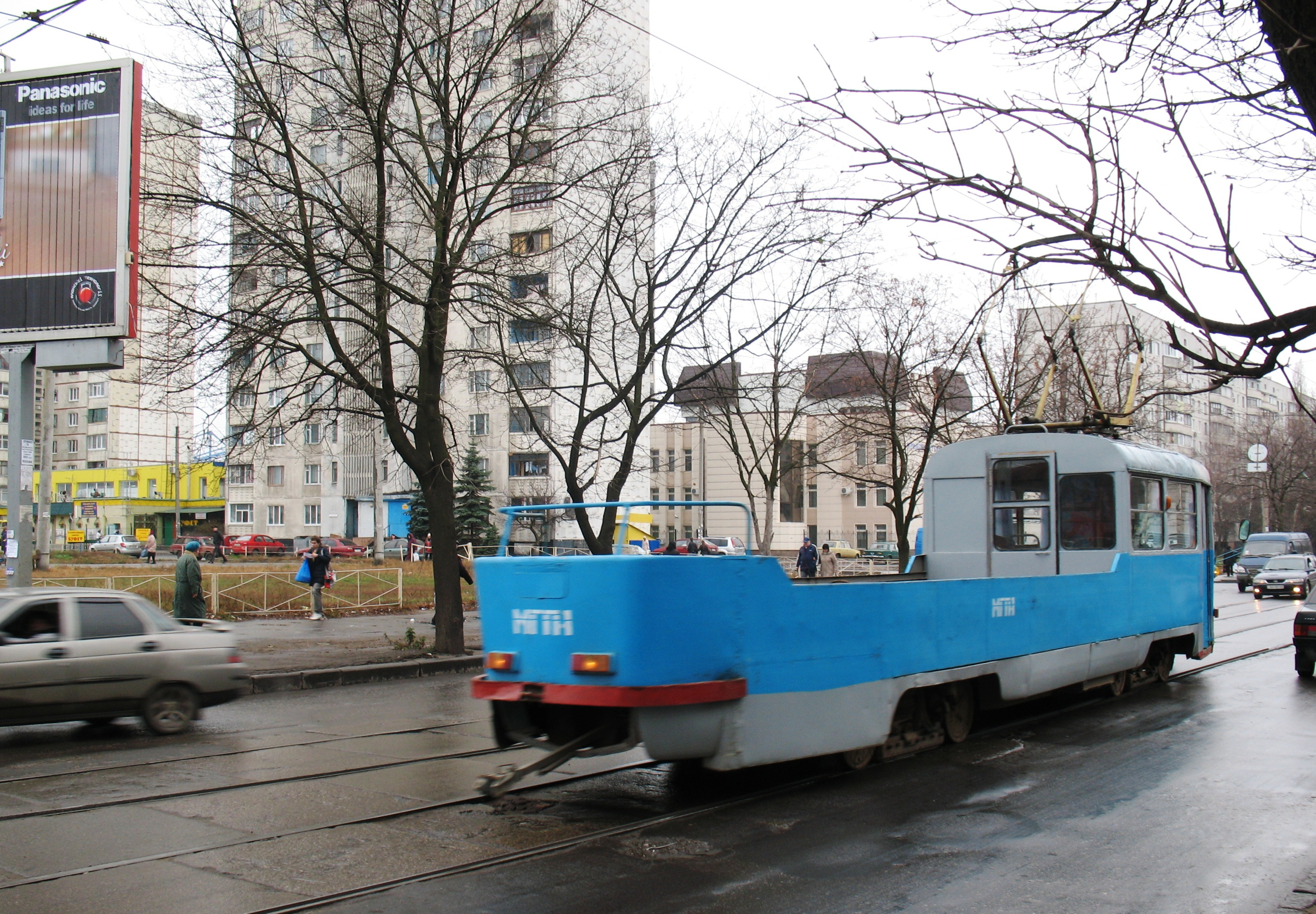
MGP-1 motorized cargo platform

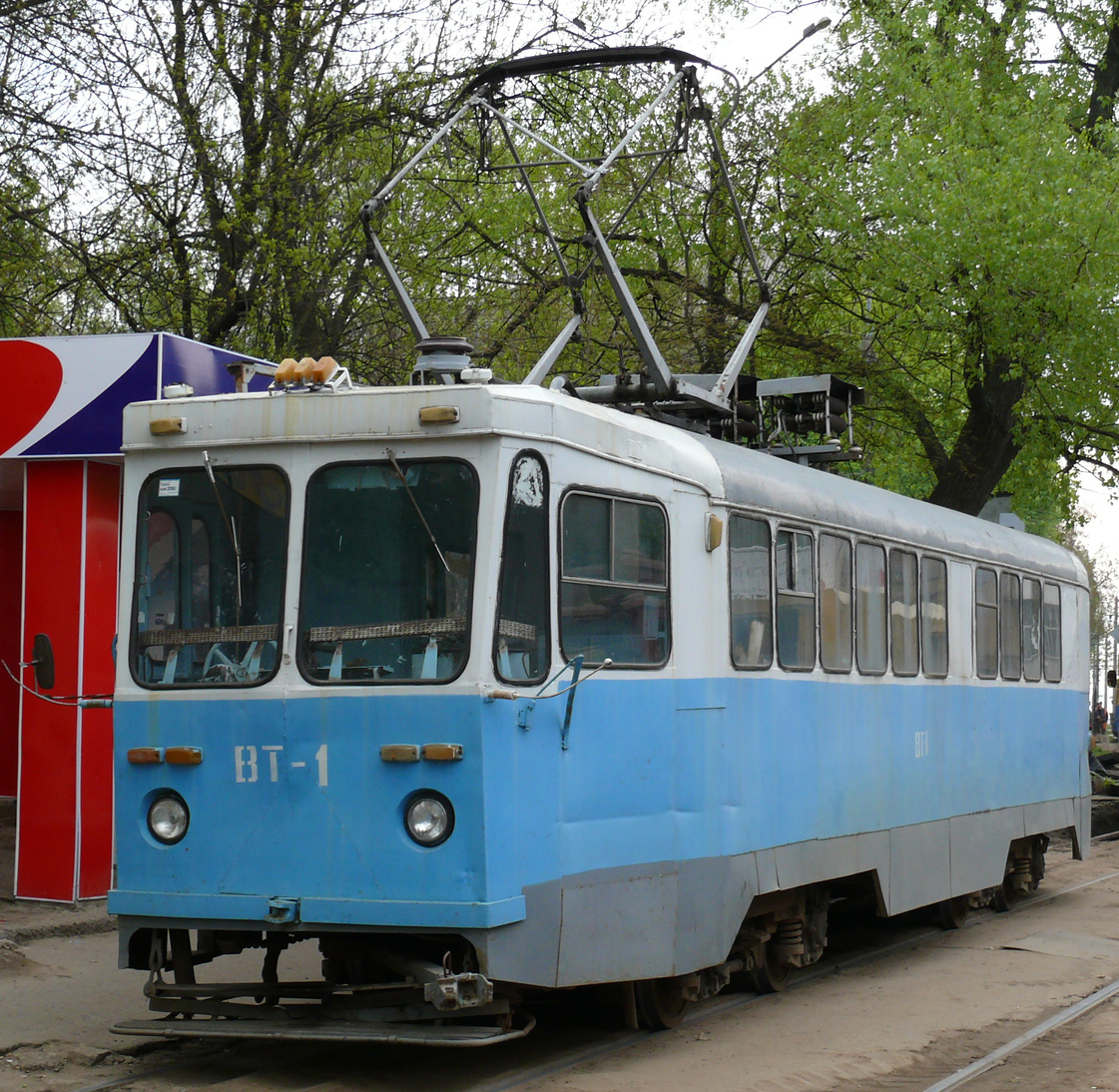
VT-1 tractor unit based on KTV-57

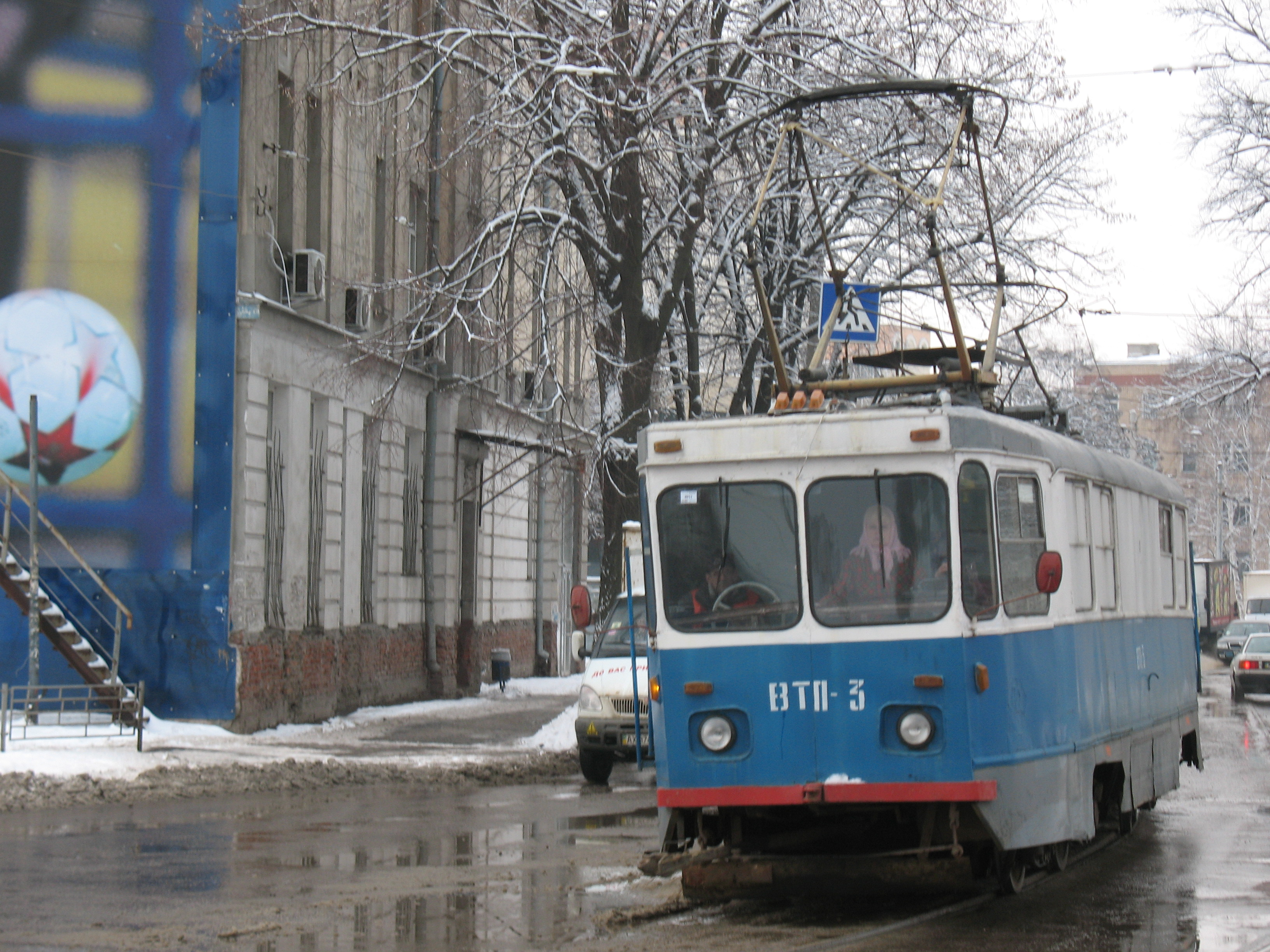
VTP-3

== See also ==
- Kharkiv Metro
- Kharkiv railway station
