= SBB Eem 923 =

Swiss electro-diesel locomotive

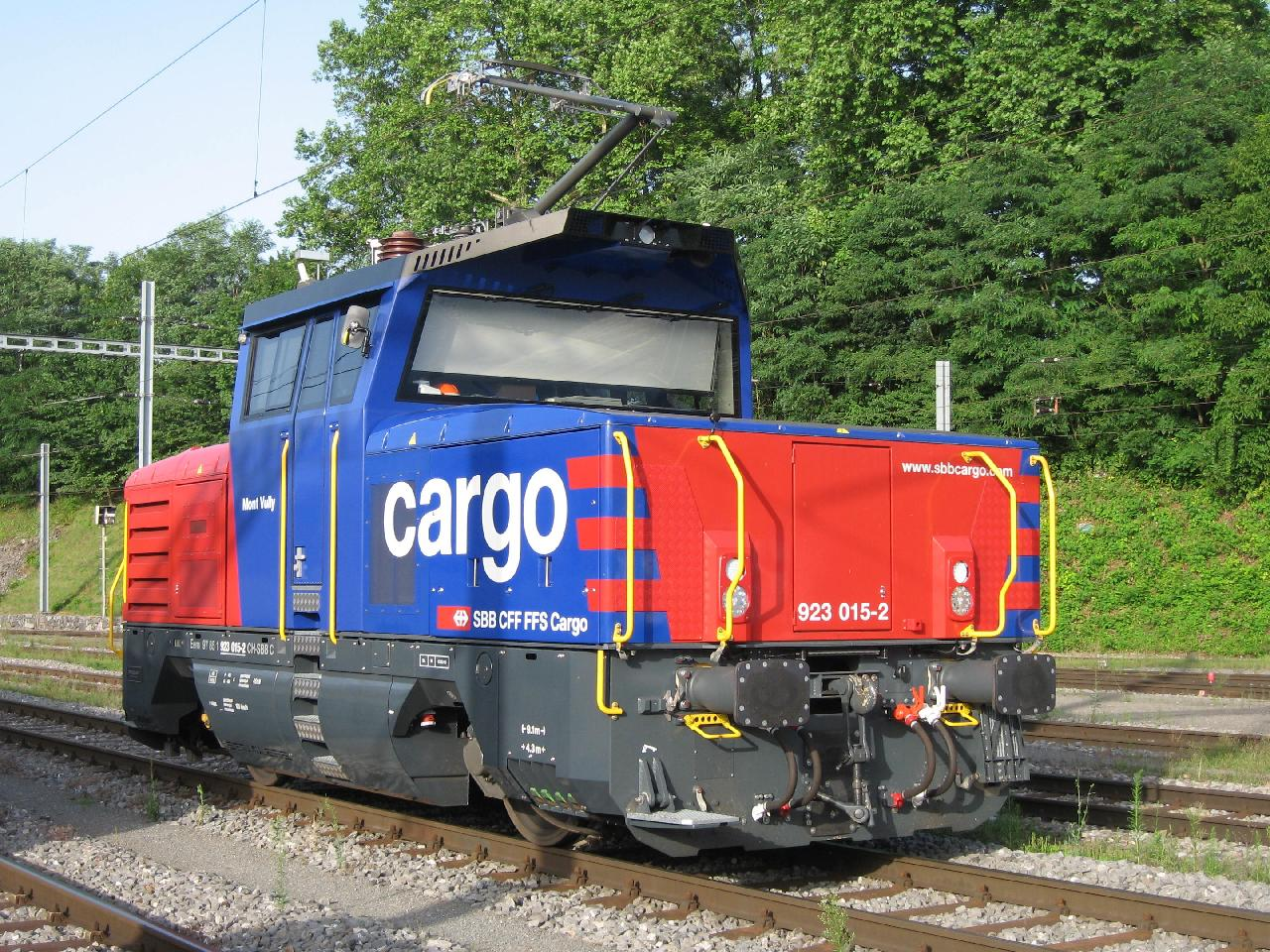
- Eem 923 015-2 series Butler at Payerne (Switzerland)
Type and origin
- Power type: Electro-diesel
- Builder: Stadler Rail
- Build date: 2011-2012
- Total produced: 30
Specifications
- Configuration
  - Whyte: 0-4-0
  - UIC: Bo
- Gauge: 1,435 mm (4 ft 8 1/2 in)
- Wheel diameter: 1.1 m (3 ft 7 in)
- Wheelbase: 4.3 m (14 ft)
- Length: 9.1 m (30 ft)
- Width: 3.1 m (10 ft)
- Height: 4.306 m (14 ft)
- Loco weight: 45,000 kg (99,208 lb)
- Electric system/s: 15 kV 16.7 Hz AC; 25 kV 50 Hz AC; Catenary
- Current pickup: Pantograph
- Transmission: electro-diesel
- MU working: within class, up to 4
- Loco brake: Air brake, Regenerative Brake
- Train brakes: Air brakes
- Safety systems: Automatic Train Control
Performance figures
- Maximum speed: 120 km/h (75 mph)
- Power output: 1,500 kW (2,012 hp) electric, 290 kW (389 hp) diesel
- Tractive effort
  - Starting: 150 kN (34,000 lbf)
Career
- Operators: Swiss Federal Railways
- Number in class: 30
- Official name: Butler
- Delivered: 2011 - 2013
- Disposition: All in service

The SBB Eem 923 is a dual power version of the SBB Ee 922 electric shunting locomotive which was introduced into service with the Swiss Federal Railways (SBB) in 2012.

== History ==
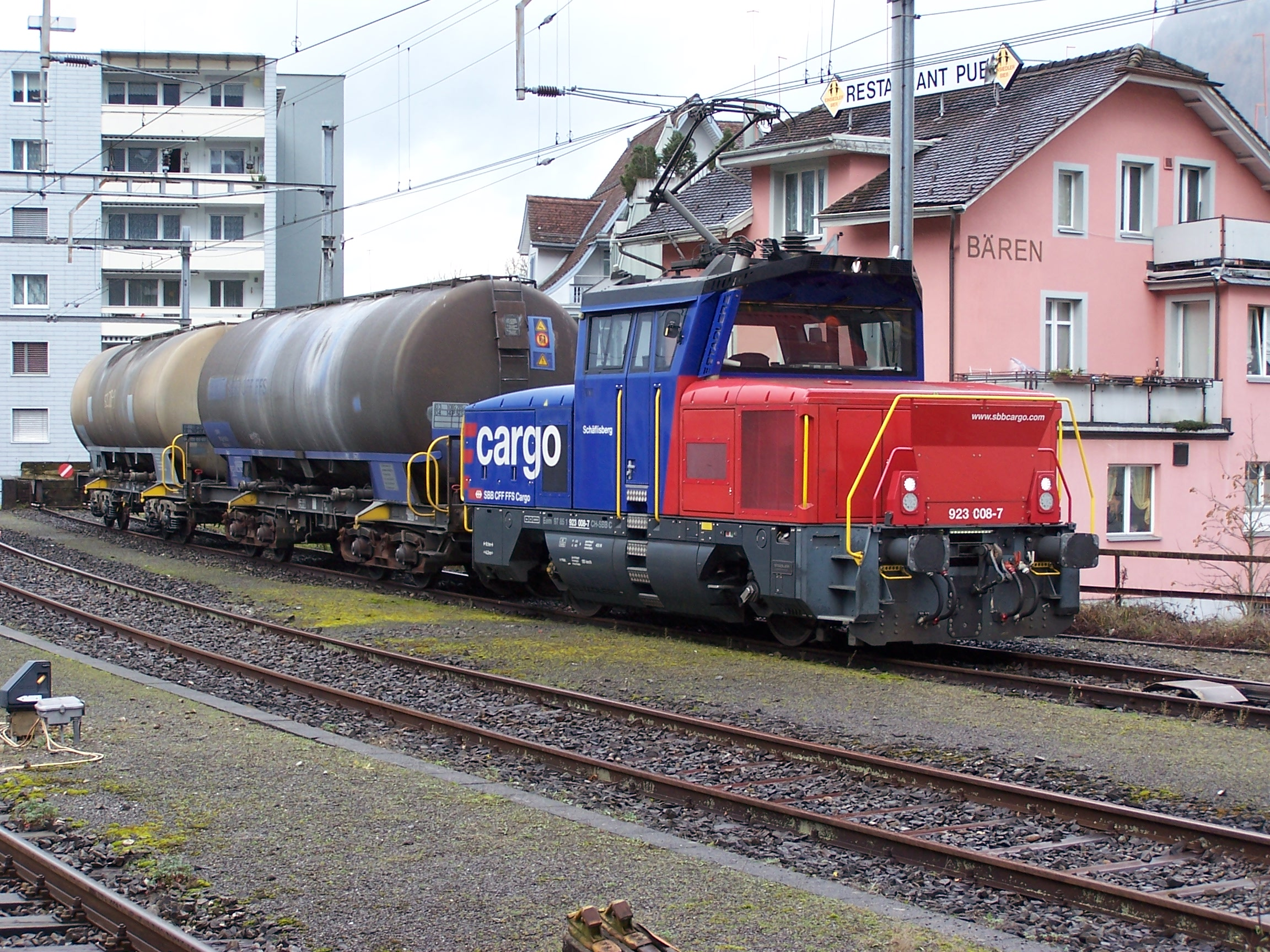
Eem 923 008-7 shunting at Arth Goldau in 2014

SBB had various shunting locomotives in use of which many had reached the end of their operational service life around 2010. As a result maintenance became expensive and combined with this was that, from an ecological perspective, these locomotives were no longer viable. Due to this SBB Cargo decided to order new dual power electro-diesel locomotives which could be used on the entire SBB network as the dual power design allowed them to operate efficiently on both the electrified rails and the short unelectrified sidings.

Because of the adoption of the Eem 923 SBB expects it can achieve a reduction in CO_{2} emissions of more than 4000 tonnes per annum compared with the current locomotives.

SBB procured 30 machines in 2010 from Stadler Winterthur AG with an overall value of CHF 88 million. The first machine was delivered in March 2012 and deliveries continued until the end of 2013.

== Specifications ==
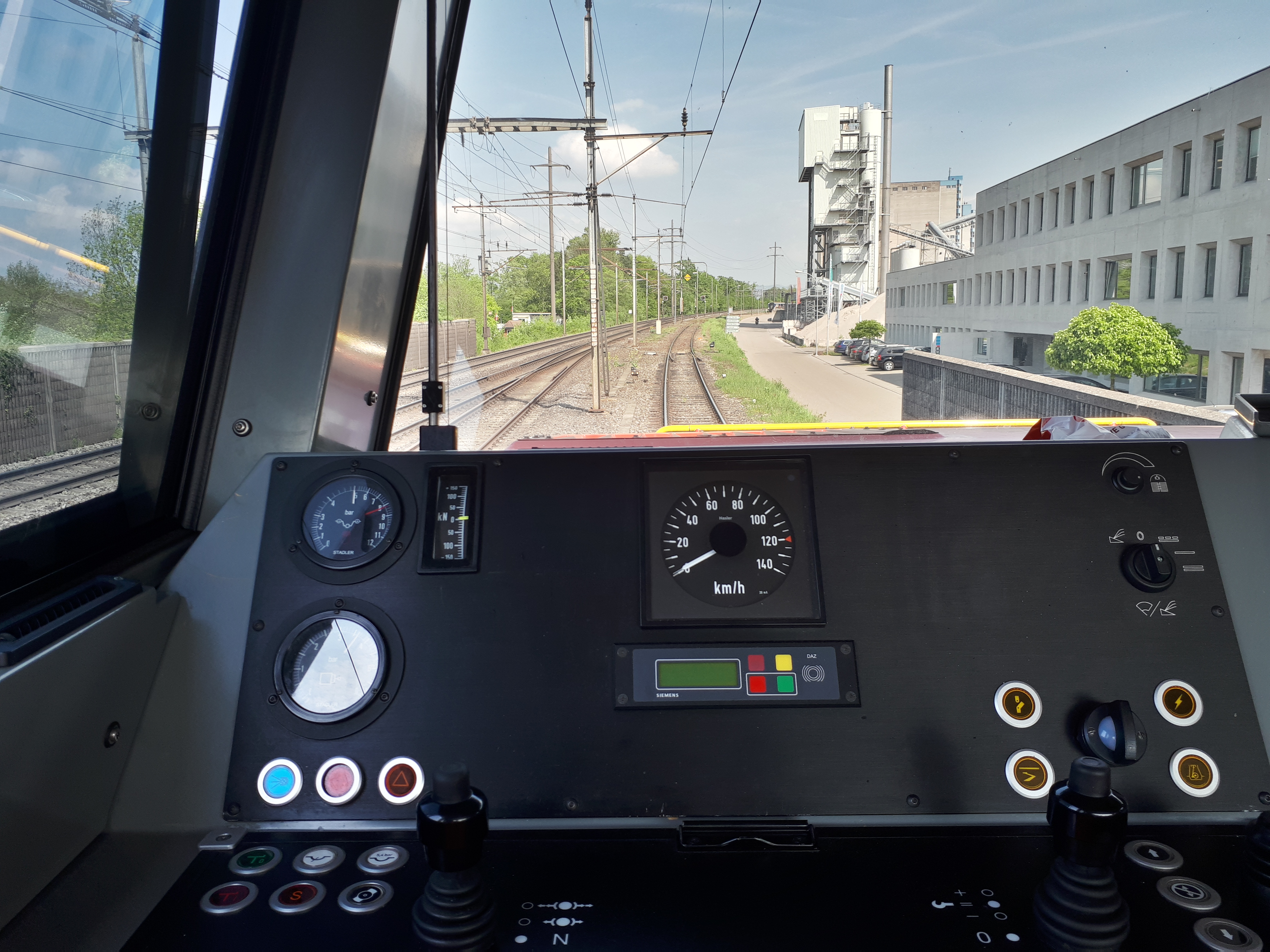
The controls of an Eem 923

The locomotives utilize a Bo wheel arrangement and are capable of traveling at speeds up to 120 km/h while operating on 15 kV AC or 25 kV AC electrified lines. While operating on electrified lines the locomotives are capable of producing a power output of 1,500 kW (2,012 hp).

When operating on non-electrified sidings, the locomotives are powered by a diesel engine-generator set which produced 290 kW (389 hp) at the wheel.

The design of the Eem 923 is derived from the Ee 922, an electrically powered two-axle locomotive also used by the SBB and produced by Stadler.
