= Verena Herzog =

Swiss politician (born 1956)

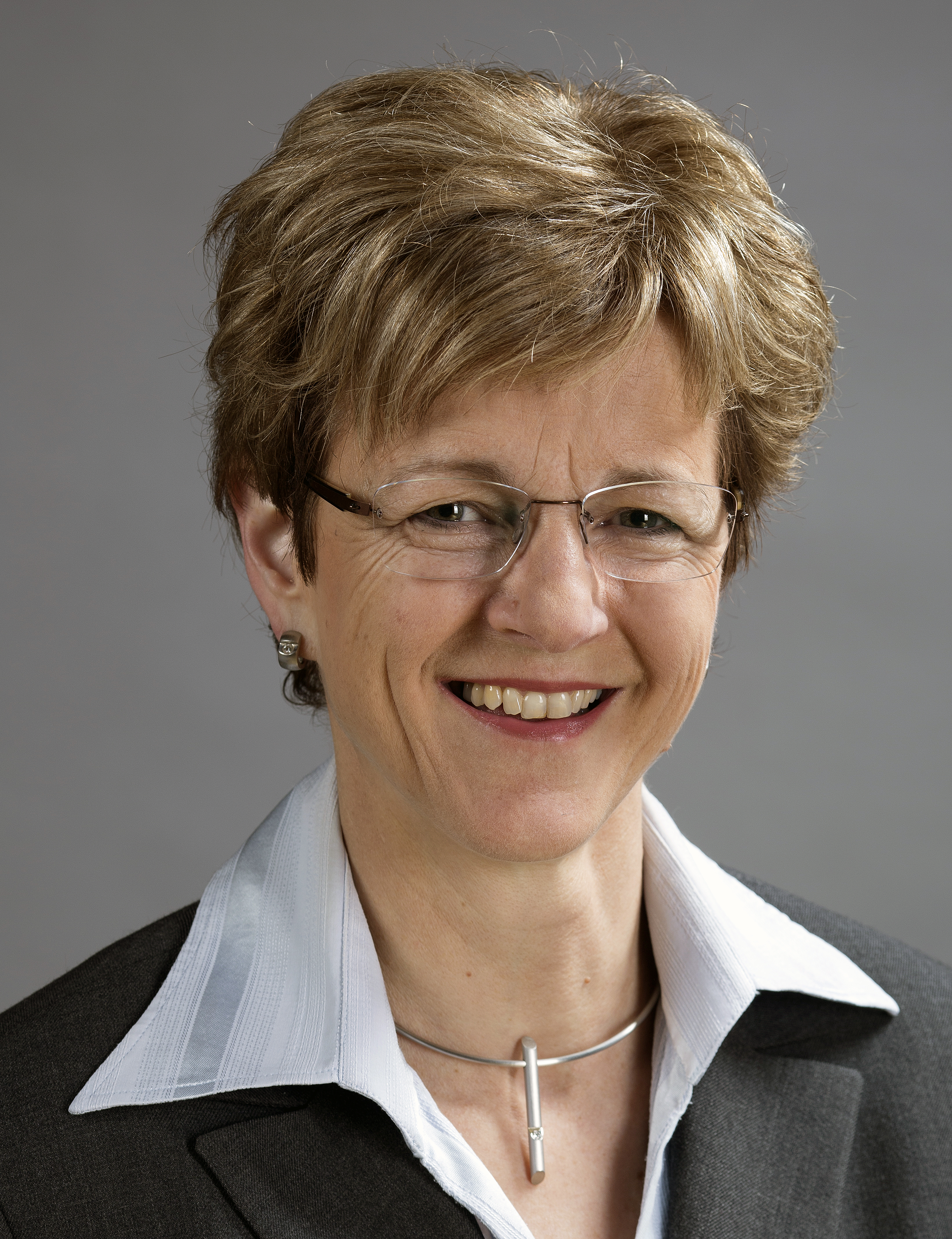
- Verena Herzog (2019)

Member of the National Council (Switzerland)
- In office 4 March 2013 – 3 November 2023
- Preceded by: Peter Spuhler
- Constituency: Canton of Thurgau

Personal details
- Born: Verena Herzog; 7 February 1956 (age 70) Winterthur, Zürich, Switzerland
- Citizenship: Swiss
- Party: Swiss People's Party
- Education: University of Teacher Education St. Gallen
- Occupation: Kindergarten teacher

Verena Herzog (born 7 February 1956 in Wintherthur) is a Swiss politician who served on the National Council (Switzerland) for the Swiss People's Party from 2013 to 2023.

== Early life and education ==
Verena Herzog was born in Winterthur, Switzerland. After completing her Matura, she pursued a degree in early childhood education, ultimately becoming a Kindergarten teacher. Since graduation she was initially spent several years in this profession.

== Career ==
Since 2001, she has served as the administrative head of her husbands orthodontics practice. She started to become politically active in 1997, when she was elected to serve on the primary school board in Frauenfeld, on which she served until 2009. Between 2006 and 2013 she was the president of the Swiss People's Party in the Frauenfeld District. In 2007, she was elected to succeed Jakob Turnherr in the Grand Council of Thurgau, where she served on the audit committee. In 2009, she was elected to serve in the municipal government of Frauenfeld.

Herzog campaigned for election into the National Council of Switzerland in 2007 and 2011. In 2011 she was placed as the first reserve. After the resignation of Peter Spuhler, she was ultimately elected to serve as National Councillor for the Swiss People's Party in 2013. Due to her new mandate she resigned to serve on the legislative of Frauenfeld (municipal government) as well as her mandate as Grand Councillor. In the 2015 and 2019 her seat was confirmed twice. In September 2022, Herzog announced to resign from her position by the end of the next legislative period in 2023.

Her political views are conservative and she supports the traditional family model. Since 2015, she is a member of the conservative, Christian association 'for a traditional family'. Their focus is on strengthening the traditional family model as well as the prevention against same-sex marriage, which was approved in the elections from 21 September 2021. She is the president of the association 'youth without drugs' and co-president of the association 'Gardens of Lake Constance'.
