= Stadler Metelitsa =

Tram by Stadler Rail

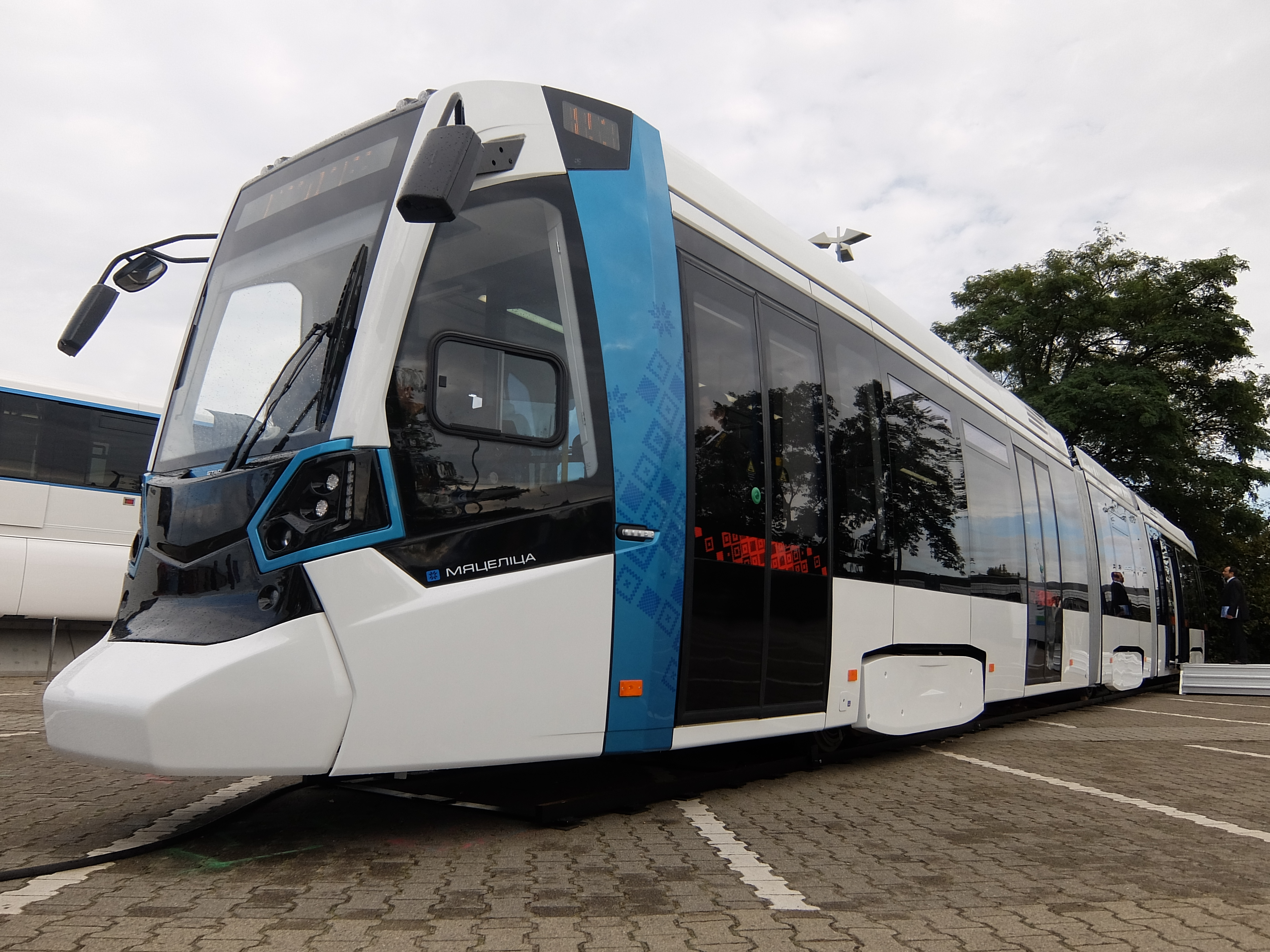
Stadler Metelitsa Innotrans in 2014

The Metelitsa is a low-floor tram (streetcars) built by Stadler Rail designed for broad gauge tram networks.

== Ordered Metelitsa trams ==
Country	City	Image	Type	Fleet numbers	Quantity	Year	Length (m)	Width (m)	Comments
Belarus	Minsk (Minsk Tramway)		B85300M					2,50	
Russia	Saint Petersburg (Saint Petersburg tramway)		B85600M		23	2018			
Ukraine	Kharkiv (Kharkiv Tramline)		B85601M		1	2021–2024			The unit completed trials but was rejected and returned to the manufacturer.
Bolivia	Cochabamba (Mi Tren)		B85601M		12	2022			
