= Stadler Rail =

Swiss rolling stock manufacturer

Stadler Rail AG

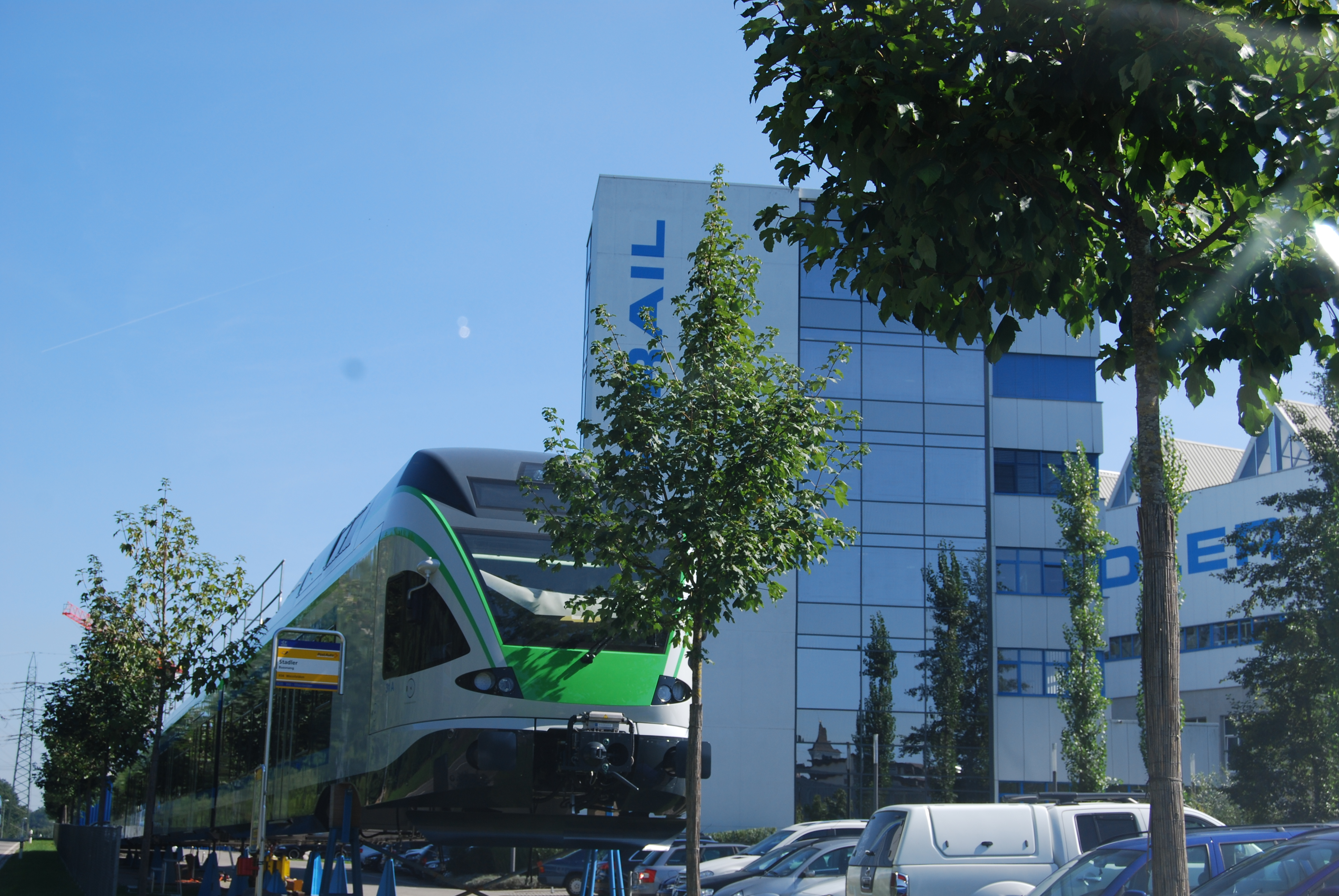
- Stadler Rail's headquarters in Bussnang, Switzerland
- Type: Public
- Traded as: SIX: SRAIL
- Industry: Train manufacturing
- Founded: 1942
- Founder: Ernst Stadler
- Headquarters: Bussnang, Switzerland
- Key people: Markus Bernsteiner (CEO); Peter Spuhler (Executive Chairman)
- Revenue: SFr 3.6 billion (2023)
- Owner: PCS Holding AG (30.5%); Peter Spuhler (11%); RAG-Stiftung (4.5%)
- Number of employees: 13,944 (2023)
- Website: stadlerrail.com

Stadler Rail AG is a Swiss manufacturer of railway rolling stock based in Bussnang, Switzerland. Established with a focus on regional multiple unit trains and trams, the company has since diversified into the production of rapid transit, high-speed rail, intercity, and sleeper train vehicles. Stadler is also among the few remaining manufacturers of rack railway rolling stock. As of 2023, the company employed approximately 13,900 people worldwide.

Stadler Rail operates through 50 subsidiaries across 23 countries, including Algeria, Germany, Italy, the Netherlands, Austria, Poland, Spain, Czech Republic, Hungary, Belarus, and the United States. The company has also established joint ventures with INKA in Indonesia and Medha Servo Drives in India.

== History ==
Stadler Rail traces its origins back to an engineering office established by Ernst Stadler (1908–1981) in 1942. Three years later, the company began to manufacture its first locomotives, building both battery-electric and diesel types. Throughout the majority of Stadler Rail's existence, it operated as a relatively small family-owned business entirely based in Switzerland that traditionally focused on manufacturing highly customised rail vehicles for its clients. The customer base were typically within relatively niche markets, such as narrow gauge and mountain railway operators, rather than those operating conventional mainline railways. After Ernst Stadler died in 1981, his second wife, Irma (c. 1923–2020), took over as CEO. Stadler Rail remained a relatively small rolling stock manufacturer even through to the 1990s; by the mid-1990s, Stadler reportedly had only 100 employees.

Around 1984, Stadler Rail decided to embark on the manufacture of passenger rolling stock for the first time. In 1987, Peter Spuhler, an in-law relative of the Stadler family through his marriage to one of Ernst Stadler's granddaughters, joined the company and subsequently took over as CEO from Irma Stadler in 1989. Spuhler then decided to expand the business via the launch of new products, as well as the acquisition of two other Swiss factories that built specialist rail vehicles for rack-and-pinion and narrow gauge railways. Stadler Rail experienced a considerable uptick in business during the latter years of 1990s. Its customer base continued to expand year after year over the following two decades to become one of the fastest growing and most innovative train manufacturing companies operating in Europe. Stadler Rail has become a serious competitor in several categories to traditional major rolling stock companies, such as Alstom and Siemens, and has successfully secured several major orders from the incumbent train operating companies of several nations.

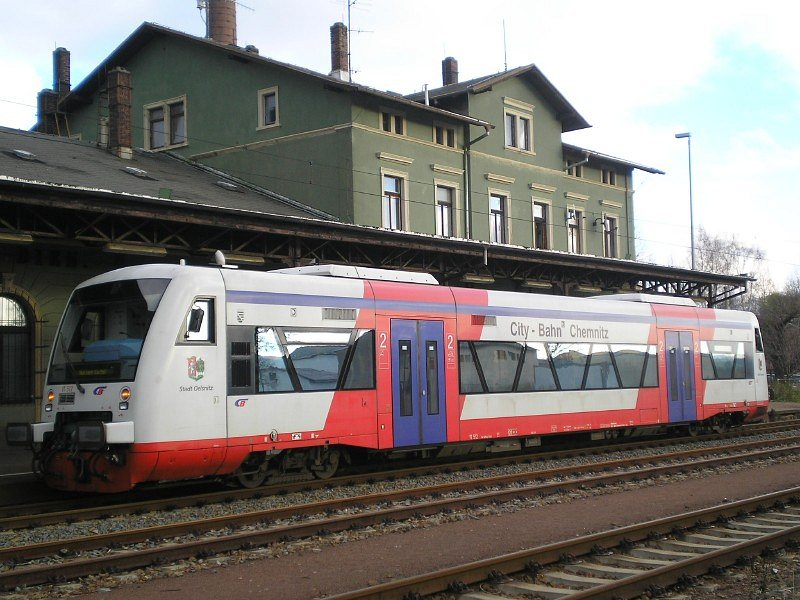
Regio-Shuttle RS1

In 1999, Stadler Rail took a 67% shareholding in a joint venture with Adtranz to manufacture the Regio-Shuttle RS1. However, following Adtranz's acquisition by Bombardier in 2001, European Union regulators insisted on the divestiture of the regional and tram product lines. As a consequence, Stadler Rail took 100% ownership of the Pankow factory in Berlin, becoming its first manufacturing base in Germany, that same year. Production of the RS1 has continued, becoming the market leading tram in the nation.

Perhaps the company's most successful product has been the FLIRT (Fast Light Innovative Regional Train) family, the range includes highly diverse configurations to suit different needs, from smaller regional units to luxurious intercity trainsets, as well as broad gauge versions for Finland and former Soviet Union nations. During 2004, Stadler Rail delivered the first trainset to the Swiss Federal Railways. By 2019, in excess of 1,400 FLIRTs have been ordered by operators in 16 countries spread across Europe, the United States, Algeria and Azerbaijan.

To facilitate an expanded order book and wider customer base, the company has rapidly expanded its production capabilities. To serve the Central and Eastern European market alone, during 2005, a new assembly plant was built in Hungary, while another was completed in Poland in the following year; six years later, a third manufacturing site was established in Belarus. By late 2019, the firm reportedly employed in excess of 7,000 employees at various locations spread across 20 countries. Each year, hundreds of rail vehicles, including trams, locomotives and coaches, are completed by the firm. In addition to its manufacturing efforts, considerable business is derived from contracted maintenance and refurbishment programmes, which Stadler Rail provides to operators throughout Europe, the United States, the Middle East and the North African regions.

The company has also grown via numerous acquisitions, including the Swiss company Winpro AG based in Winterthur in 2005, Voith Rail Services of the Netherlands in 2013, and Vossloh Rail Vehicles España S.A. of Valencia during 2015. They have been integrated into the wider Stadler Rail organisation, broadening the range of products and services on offer.

For many years, Peter Spuhler has served as the company's chief executive officer (CEO), as well as holding a major stake in the business. According to Peter Jenelten, Stadler Rail's Executive Vice-President for Marketing and Sales, has credited the business' relatively lean structure as having enabled very rapid decision-making and reducing product's time to market, which in turn has been an important selling point for its customers. Railway industry periodical Rail Magazine has claimed that Stadler Rail has been a major beneficiary of customer dissatisfaction with the dominant market competitors, particularly in terms of delivery and certification issues.

In 2014, Stadler Rail announced the formation of a joint venture with Azerbaijan-based company International Railway Distribution LLC to manufacture rolling stock in the nation. One month prior, Stadler had received a SFr120 million contract to produce 30 sleeper and dining cars. Rolling stock originally intended for Russia has also been resold to Azerbaijan and neighbouring Georgia.

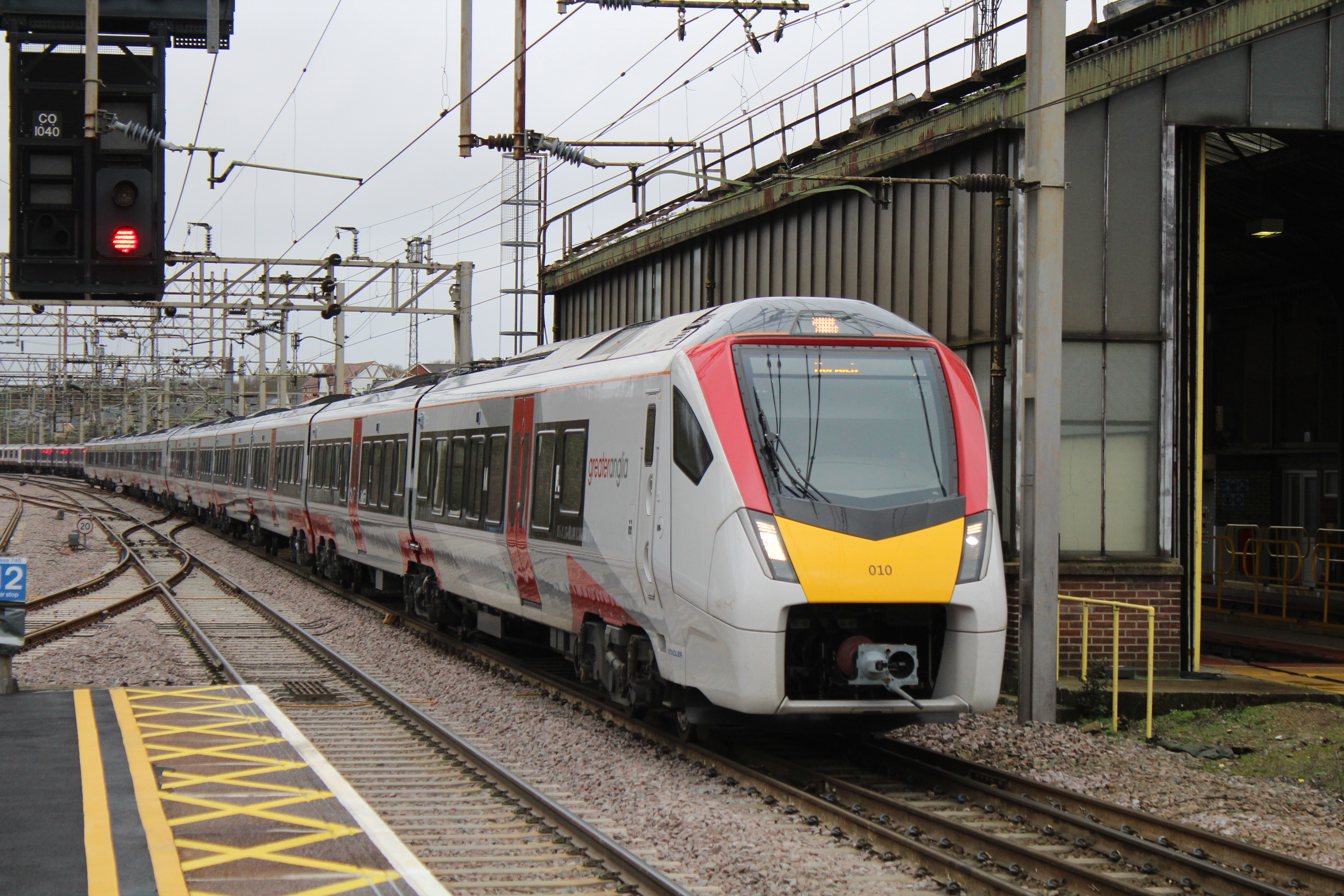
British Rail Class 745

Stadler Rail had traditionally avoided major involvement with the British railway customer base, which it has claimed was due to the unfavourable complexity of the regulatory environment. However, in 2017, management decided to embark on a decisive push into Britain, both to acquire market share amongst its rail operators and to establish new manufacturing and servicing facilities. It quickly secured a £610 million order from Abellio Greater Anglia for its FLIRT family, leading to 378 vehicles conforming to the UK's restrictive loading gauge that were built in Bussnang. Further orders in the UK market have included Glasgow Subway's order for 17 underground trains, operating via an automated driverless system, it is a first for Stadler. Another major order came from Merseytravel for bespoke electric trains for Liverpool's Merseyrail commuter rail system. It has also supplied trains and tram-trains to Transport for Wales Rail.

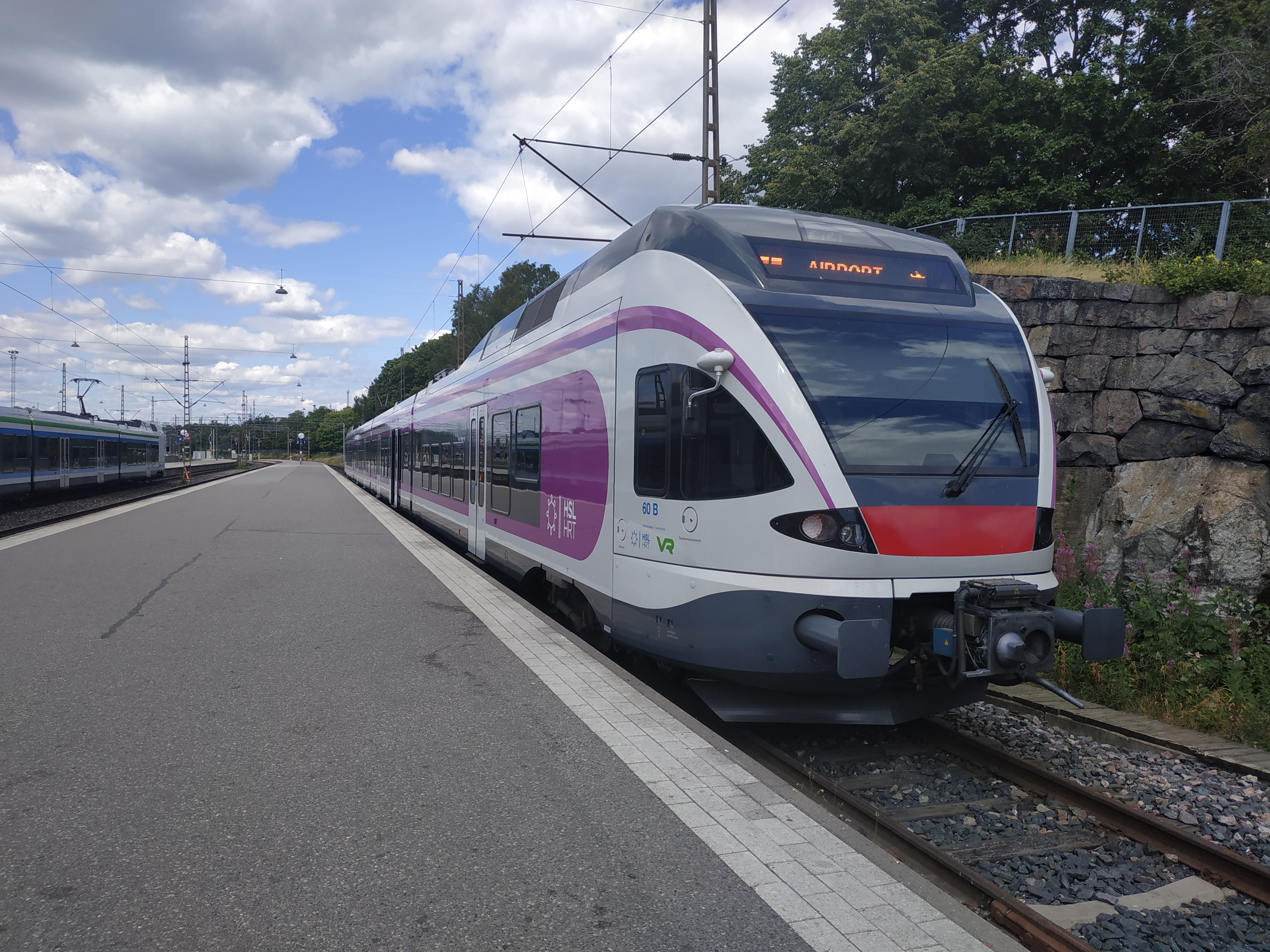
Finnish JKOY Class Sm5

In April 2019, Stadler Rail was listed on the SIX Swiss Exchange, reducing Spuhler's stake in the company to 40%. Prior to the listing, Spuhler had owned 80% of the business's share capital, while RAG-Stiftung held a further 10%, and the remaining 10% was divided amongst several senior employees at the firm.

In recent years, the light rail and metro sectors have become increasingly important customers. Various operators in Germany, Norway, and Britain have adopted the company's Variobahn trams, while Stadler Rail received its first contract for underground trains during 2015. In December 2015, the firm’s had a huge order via a joint venture with Siemens Mobility for up to 1,380 vehicles for Berlin's S-Bahn, the last of which are to be delivered by 2023. During 2019, Stadler Rail was reportedly making efforts to capitalise on smaller operators, driven by trends towards regionalisation and open-access operation, to secure business for its railcars, light rail vehicles and multiple units.

Stadler has a large manufacturing facility in Fanipaĺ, Belarus. Following the disputed 2020 Belarusian presidential elections and the 2022 Russian invasion of Ukraine, the company came under pressure to reduce its exposure in those countries. By June 2022, electronic parts used to assemble rail equipment are no longer deliverable to Fanipaĺ due to international sanctions against Belarus following the forced diversion of Ryanair Flight 4978. In response, Stadler moved equipment and personnel to Poland, Switzerland and the US to make up for that loss. The board of directors decided to keep the site and stressed that the company has to follow supranational decisions by international organisations such as the OECD, UN and EU but their commitment is towards the people working at the site, stating that Stadler "serves the public not dictators". The subsidiaries OOO Stadler (Moskau) and Stadler Reinickendorf (Berlin) were liquidated in 2022.

== Factories ==
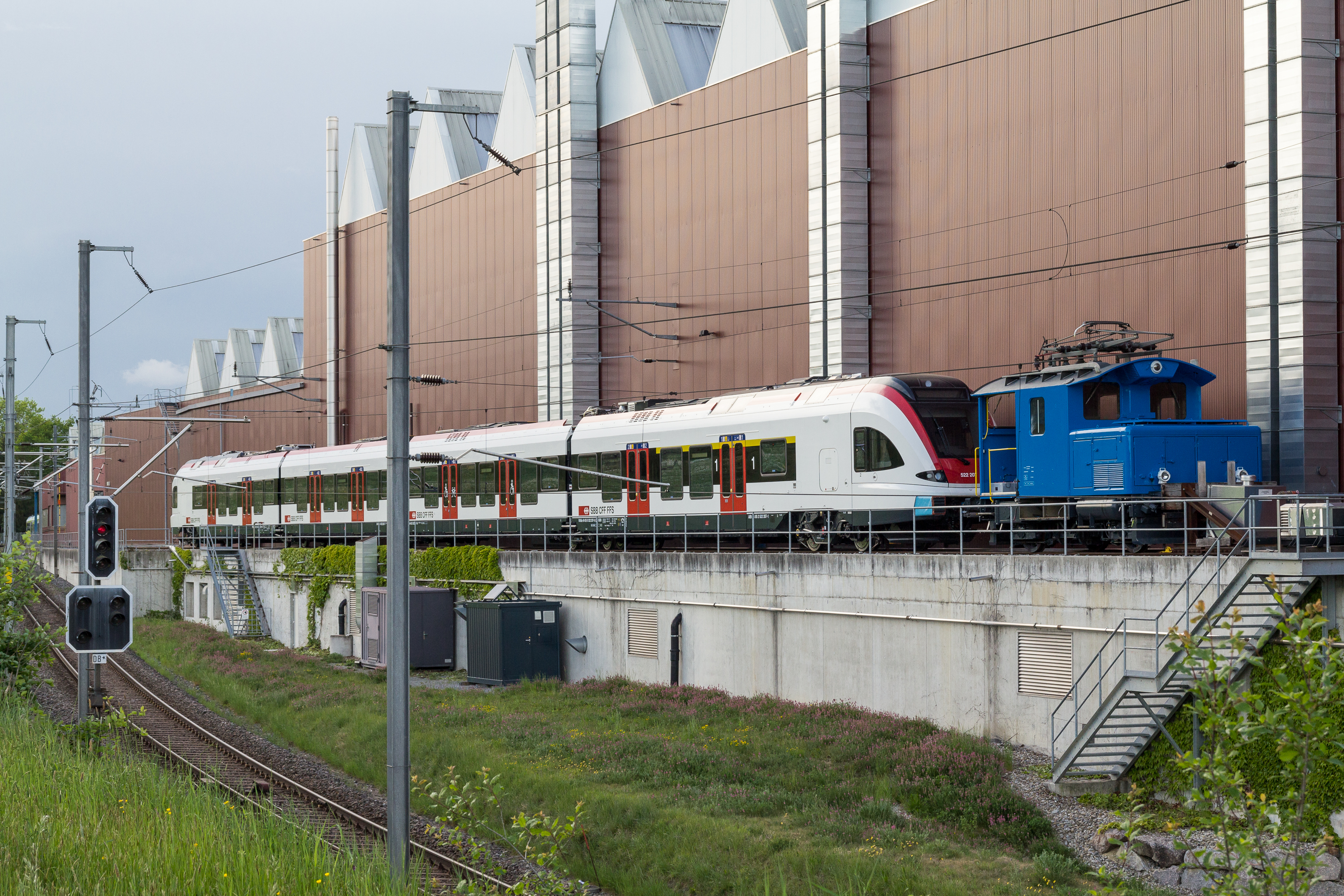
New train at Stadler Bussnang factory

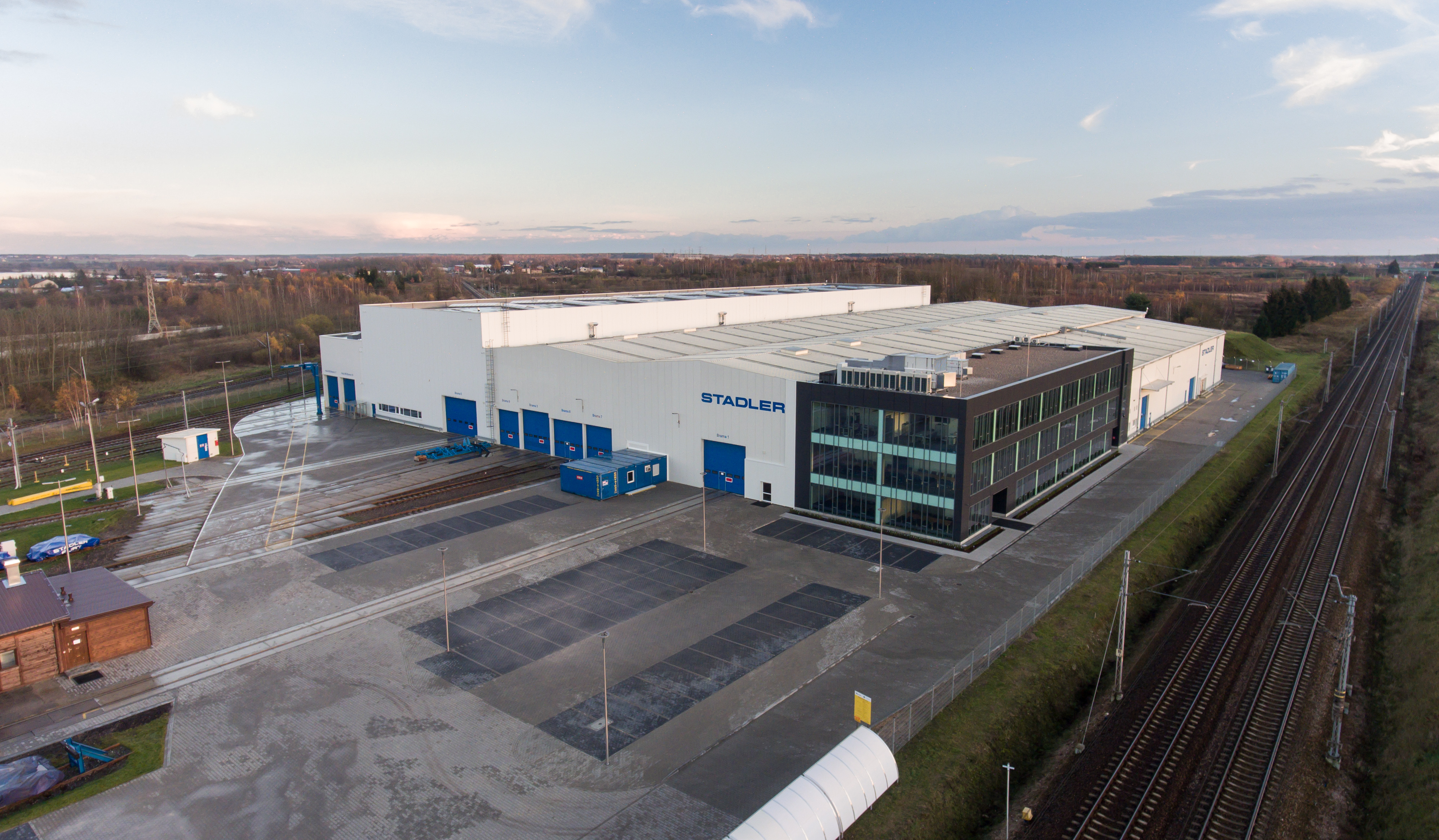
Stadler Polska in Siedlce

- Bussnang, Switzerland; site of original factory 1962

Stadler Bussnang AG

- Altenrhein, Switzerland; acquired in 1997 from the Schindler Group

Stadler Altenrhein AG / Stadler Rheintal AG

- Pankow, Berlin, Germany; acquired in 2000/2001 from Adtranz

Stadler Pankow GmbH

- Biel/Bienne, Switzerland; 2004 acquired by bid

Stadler Stahlguss AG

- Siedlce, Poland; 2007 acquired by

Stadler Polska Sp.z o.o.

- Weiden in der Oberpfalz, Bavaria, Germany; ex Partner für Fahrzeugausstattung, since 4 January 2005 called

Stadler Weiden GmbH

- Winterthur, Switzerland; ex Winpro AG (ex Swiss Locomotive and Machine Works) acquired on 7 September 2005

Stadler Winterthur AG

- Szolnok, Hungary; since 2009

Stadler Szolnok Kft.

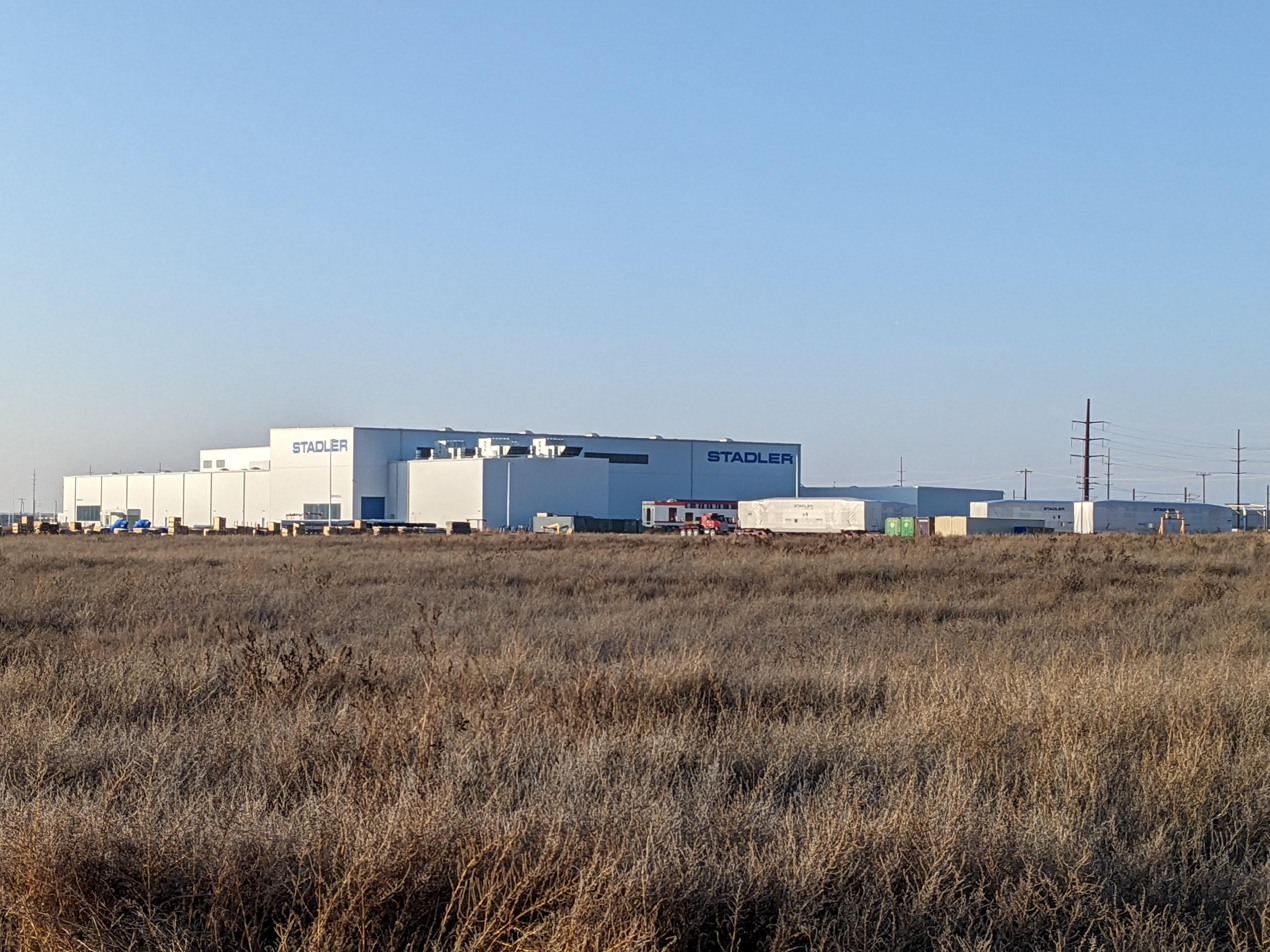
Stadler US in Salt Lake City

- Fanipal, Belarus; 2014 acquired

ZAT Stadler Minsk

- Salt Lake City, Utah, USA; 2015

Stadler US Inc.

- Albuixech, Valencia, Spain; ex Vossloh rail-vehicles division (ex MACOSA plant of Alstom), acquired in 2015

Stadler Rail Valencia SAU

- Craiova, Romania; 2019 joint venture with Electroputere for rolling stock equipment manufacturing
- St. Margrethen, Switzerland; opened in 2019

Stadler St. Margrethen AG / Stadler Rheintal AG

- Banyuwangi, Java, Indonesia; joint venture with PT INKA, under construction

PT Stadler INKA Indonesia

- Hyderabad, Telangana, India; joint venture with Medha Servo Drives, under construction

== Rolling stock ==
Stadler has a range of standard modular vehicles:

=== Multiple units ===
Name	Description	Image
FLIRT	Flexible electric, diesel, bi-mode or hydrogen multiple unit for regional services	
KISS	Double-deck EMU for regional services	
Regio Shuttle	Diesel, hydrogen or battery railcar for local branch line services	
SMILE	EMU for high-speed rail services	

=== Light rail ===
Name	Description	Image
Citylink		
TINA		
Tramlink		
Variobahn		
Tango		

=== Locomotives ===
Name	Description	Image
EURO		
EUROLIGHT	A lighter variant of the EURO for passenger and light freight roles	
EURODUAL		
SALi		

- The GTW, an articulated railcar.
- The WINK, a diesel/battery or electric/battery short multiple unit.
- The SPATZ, a narrow gauge railcar with panoramic windows.
- The METRO, a fully customisable electric multiple-unit train for urban rapid transit systems.

=== Custom ===
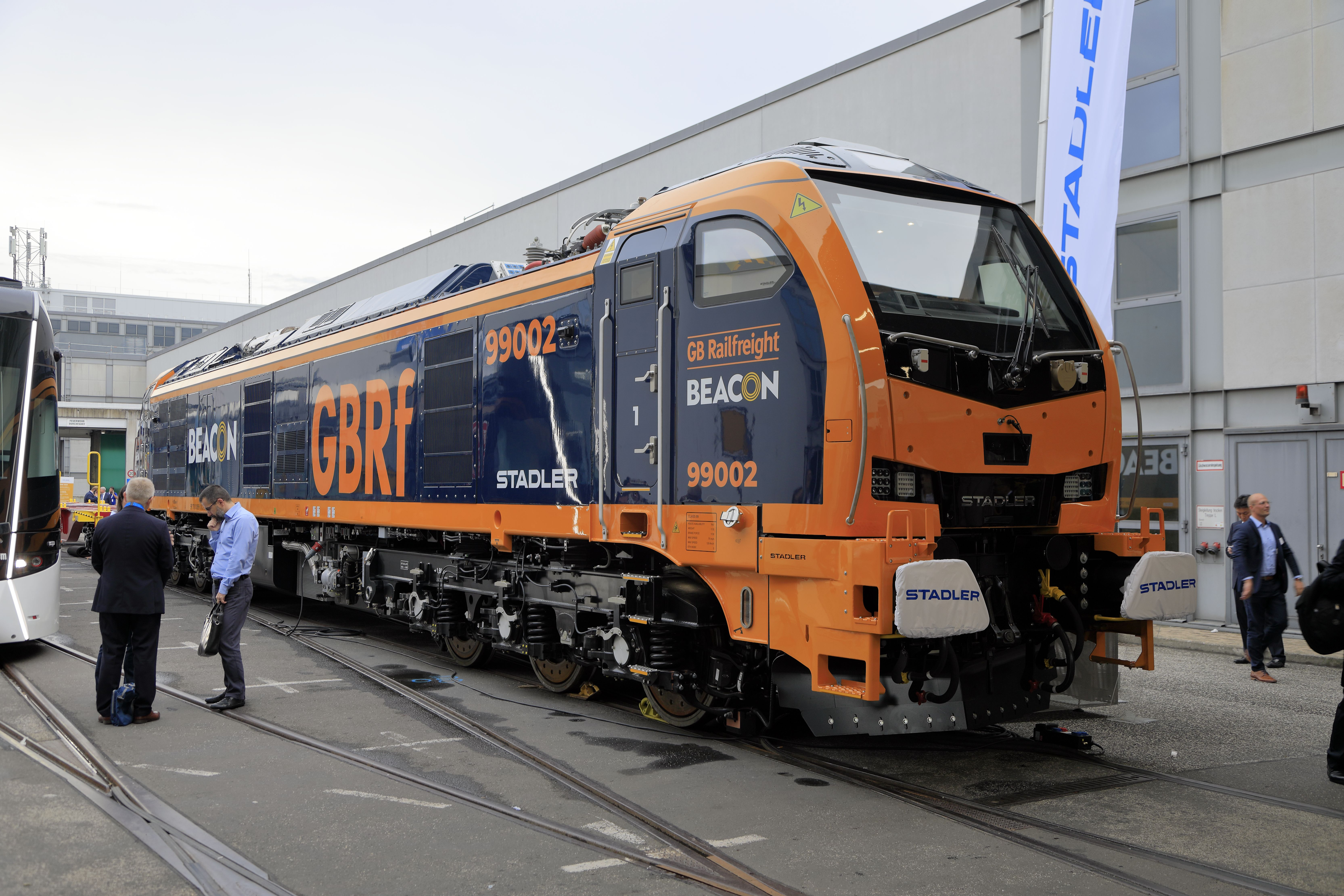
British Rail Class 99

Stadler has also built a number of custom vehicles for specific customers, in some cases including elements of their standard designs. These include:

- The NExT and Worbla for Regionalverkehr Bern-Solothurn in Switzerland
- The Allegra and Capricorn for Rhaetian Railway in Switzerland
- The Ee 922, an electric shunting locomotive built for Swiss Federal Railways
- The Eem 923, a hybrid electro-diesel shunting locomotive built for Swiss Federal Railways
- The RABe 514, a bilevel electric multiple unit train for the Zürich S-Bahn (with Siemens Transportation Systems)
- Semi-modular light-rail vehicles for the Forchbahn and Trogenerbahn in Switzerland
- Rack railway cars for the Wengernalpbahn, the Jungfraubahn, the Rorschach-Heiden-Bahn, and the Matterhorn Gothard Bahn in Switzerland, the Montserrat Railway and the Vall de Núria Railway in Spain, the Diakofto–Kalavryta Railway in Greece, the Manitou and Pikes Peak Railway in the United States, and the Corcovado Rack Railway in Brazil
- The He 4/4 for MRS Logística in Brazil, the most powerful cogwheel locomotive in the world
- GoldLeaf bilevel coaches for the Rocky Mountaineer, similar in design to the Colorado Railcar Ultra Dome.
- Metelitsa tram for Saint Petersburg and Cochabamba
- DBAG Class 483/484 for Berlin S-Bahn (with Siemens Mobility)
- New Zealand DM class locomotive for KiwiRail in New Zealand.
- SL X15p for the Roslagsbanan in Sweden
- VR Class Dr19 diesel-electric locomotives for VR Group in Finland
- GoldenPass Express in Switzerland with variable gauge axles
- Two-section diesel-electric railcar designated as Bm 4/8 for Huawei's Lianqiu Lake R&D Center in Qingpu, Shanghai
- Battery-electric locomotives to be used to haul work trains for Paris Metro
- British Rail Class 99 locomotive for GB Railfreight.
- VIA Rail ordered 45 diesel battery hybrid based off of EURO locomotive design.
