= Peter Spuhler =

Swiss industrialist and politician

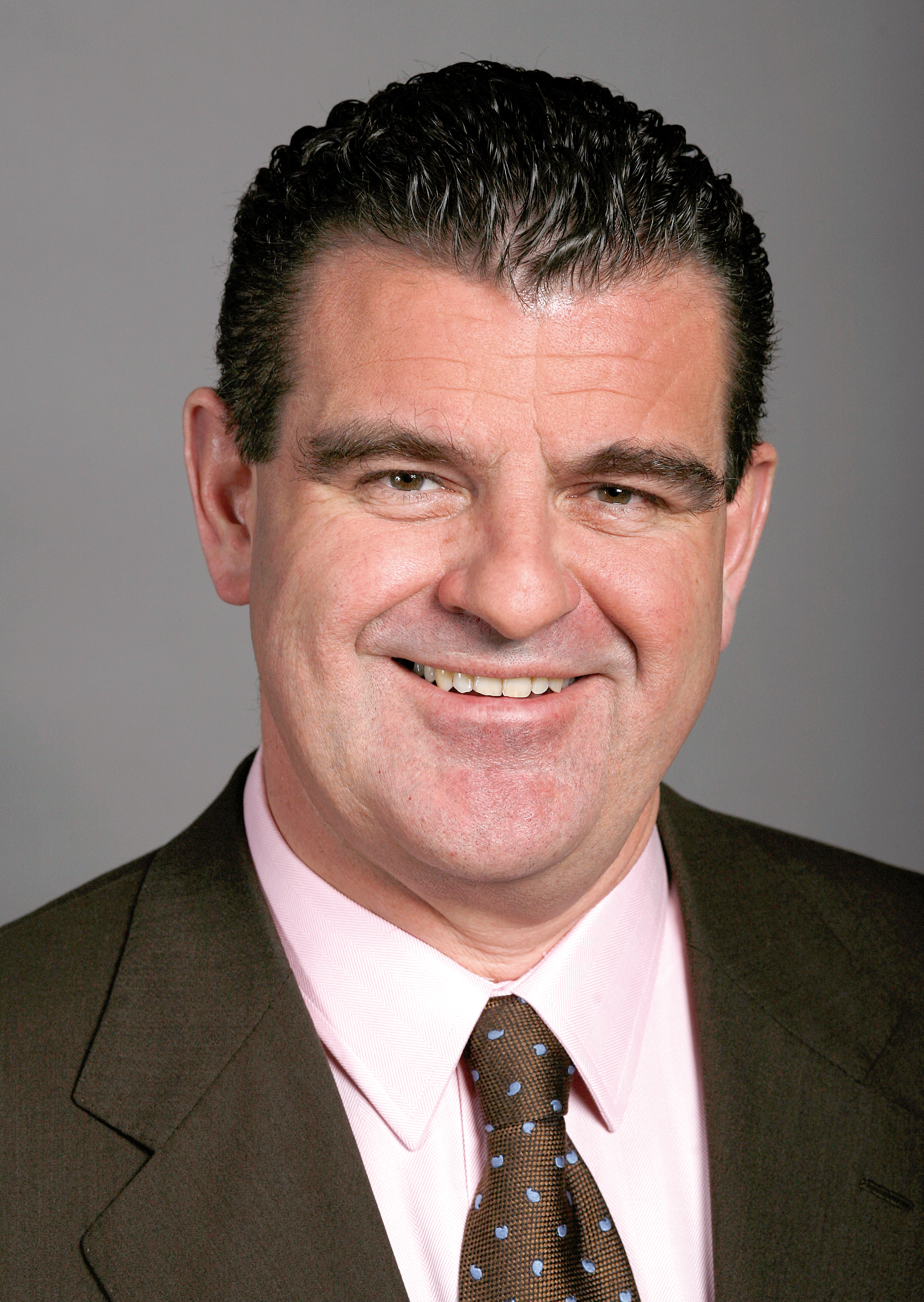
- Official portrait, 2007

Member of the National Council (Switzerland)
- In office 6 December 1999 – 31 December 2012
- Succeeded by: Verena Herzog
- Constituency: Canton of Thurgau

Personal details
- Born: Peter Christoph Spuhler; 9 January 1959 (age 67) Seville, Spain
- Citizenship: Swiss
- Party: Swiss People's Party
- Spouse: Andrea Schaffner (m. 1986, divorced) Daniela Hoffmann (m. 2008)
- Children: 4
- Education: University of St. Gallen
- Occupation: Entrepreneur

Military service
- Allegiance: Switzerland
- Branch/service: Special Forces Command (Switzerland)
- Rank: Captain
- Unit: Grenadier

Peter Christoph Spuhler (Swiss Standard German pronunciation: [ˈpeːtər ˈkrɪstɔf ˈʃpuːlər]; born 9 January 1959 in Seville) is a Swiss business magnate, industrialist and politician who most notably served on the National Council (Switzerland) from 1999 to 2012 for the Swiss People's Party.

In 1989, Spuhler took-over Stadler Rail, which was founded by the grandfather of his first wife Ernst Stadler, and has served as its chief executive officer 1989 to 2017 and again on an ad interim basis from 2020 until 2023. He built the company almost from ground-up to a multinational concern with notable projects such as Caltrain in California. His net worth is estimated at $3.9 billion by Forbes magazine.

== Early life ==
Spuhler was born 9 January 1959 in Seville, Spain, the older of two children, to Paul Spuhler (1920–2014), a chef, and Margrit Spuhler (née Bossard; 1920–2017). His father was the head chef of the Dolder Grand in Zurich, Switzerland from 1960 to 1987. He has one younger sister, Maya Spuhler.

After completing his Matura in Zurich, as well as compulsory military service, Spuhler studied business administration at the University of St. Gallen from 1980 to 1986. In his youth he played ice hockey for the Grasshopper Club Zürich.

== Professional career ==
=== Stadler Rail ===
After marrying into the Stadler family, Spuhler took up his position in 1987 at Stadler Fahrzeuge AG, which was then managed by Irma Stadler, the widow of company founder Ernst Stadler. Two years later, he took over the company with its 18 employees and a turnover of approx. 4.5 million Swiss francs, according to his statement with a bank loan from the Thurgauer Kantonalbank for around 5 million Swiss francs. He restructured it and, with the Stadler GTW, opted for a new vehicle that was more suitable for modern local transport. In order to continue to be successful in rail vehicle construction, Spuhler bought the Werk Altenrhein from Schindler Waggon AG in 1997. The new holding structure favored expansion into Germany and Eastern Europe. On 1 April 2018, Spuhler handed over the management of the Stadler Rail Group to Thomas Ahlburg. Since then, he has concentrated on the Stadler Rail Group as president of the board of directors. As of May 2020, due to differences in the strategic and organisational development of Stadler Rail AG, he took over the position of Group CEO ad interim until 2023, when Markus Bernsteiner took over as the new CEO.

=== Other roles ===
Spuhler is a member of the board of directors of the Aebi-Schmidt Group and is on the board of directors of two other companies: Gleisag (Rorschach) and Walo Bertschinger AG (Zurich). Since April 2019, he has been a member of Robert Bosch Industrietreuhand KG and also sits on the supervisory board of Robert Bosch GmbH. He is also a member of the Mittelthurgau Employers' Association in Weinfelden, the IG Freiheit, the Thurgau Chamber of Industry and Commerce (Weinfelden) and the Information Service for Public Transport (Bern). Spuhler is also involved in the Tele D Foundation (Diessenhofen) and is vice president of the Betriebs AG of the ZSC Lions.

== Political career ==
From 1999 until 2012, Spuhler sat as a member of the National Council of Switzerland, representing the canton of Thurgau for the Swiss People's Party (SVP/UDC), and also sat on the Swiss government's parliamentary committee for economy and taxation. Unlike the vast majority of the SVP/UDC caucus, Spuhler is supportive of the freedom of movement of workers between Switzerland and the EU,

In November 2020, Spuhler was offered the position of Switzerland's honorary consul to Russia, but declined the office.

== Personal life ==
In 1986, Spuhler married Andrea Schaffner, a granddaughter of Ernst Stadler, who founded Stadler Rail. They had two children;

- Lucas Spuhler (born 1991)
- Laura Spuhler (born 1994), married to Rolf Hächler.

They were divorced in the 2000s. In 2008, Spuhler married secondly to Daniela Hoffmann (born 1977), who owns the construction companies Esslinger Ltd. and Barizzi Ltd., in Zurich, which she took-over from her parents. They had two children;

- Ladina Spuhler (born 2009)
- Laurin Urs Spuhler (10 September 2015 – 30 October 2015), died in childbed.

Spuhler and his family resides in Warth-Weiningen.
