= SBB Ee 922 =

Swiss shunting locomotive

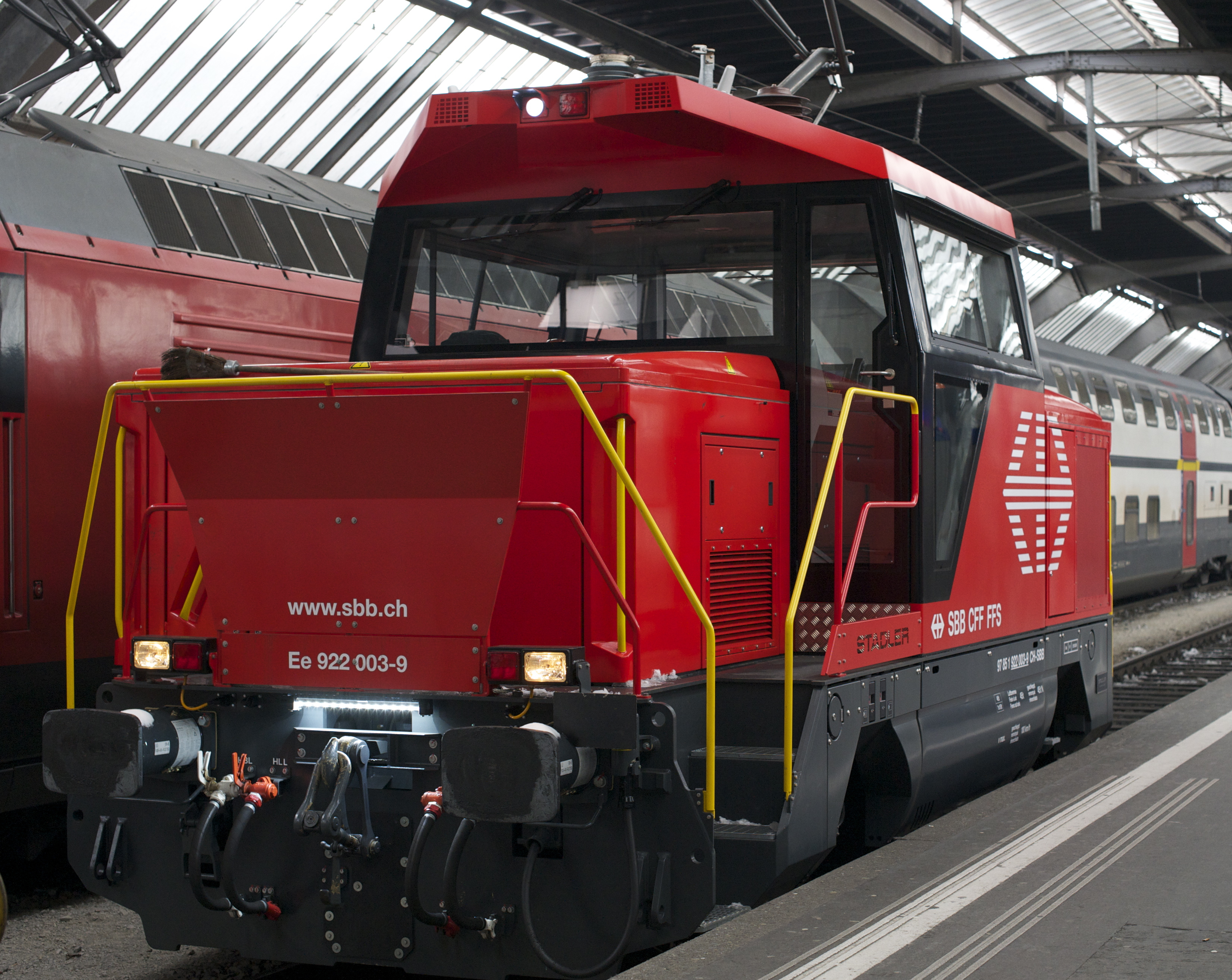
- Ee 922 seen at Zürich Hauptbahnhof shortly after delivery.
Type and origin
- Power type: Electric
- Builder: Stadler Rail
- Build date: 2009–2010
- Total produced: 21
Specifications
- Configuration
  - Whyte: 4wOE
  - UIC: Bo
- Gauge: 1,435 mm (4 ft 8 1/2 in)
- Wheel diameter: 1100 mm
- Wheelbase: 4000 mm
- Length: 8800 mm
- Width: 3100 mm
- Height: 4306 mm
- Loco weight: 44 tonnes (43.3 long tons; 48.5 short tons)
- Electric system/s: 15 kV 16.7 Hz AC and 25 kV 50 Hz AC, both supplied by overhead line
- Current pickup: Pantograph
- Traction motors: TSA TMF 61-55-6
- Gear ratio: 1 : 5.95 (Gmeinder GGT240S/595)
Performance figures
- Maximum speed: 100 km/h (62 mph)
- Power output: 612 kW (821 hp)
- Tractive effort: 120 kN (27,000 lbf)
Career
- Operators: Swiss Federal Railways
- Numbers: 922 001 – 922 021
- Delivered: From July 2009

The Ee 922 is a class of 21 electric shunting locomotives built since 2009 by Stadler Rail for Swiss Federal Railways. The locomotives are based on Stadler's BUTLER family of shunting locomotives.

Ordered in 2007, the units were delivered from 2009 to 2010. The locomotives are used for shunting passenger stock at terminus stations across Switzerland.

== See also ==
- List of stock used by Swiss Federal Railways
