= Ivan Golenishchev-Kutuzov =

Ivan Timofeevich Golenishchev-Kutuzov
- Иван Тимофеевич Голенищев-Кутузов
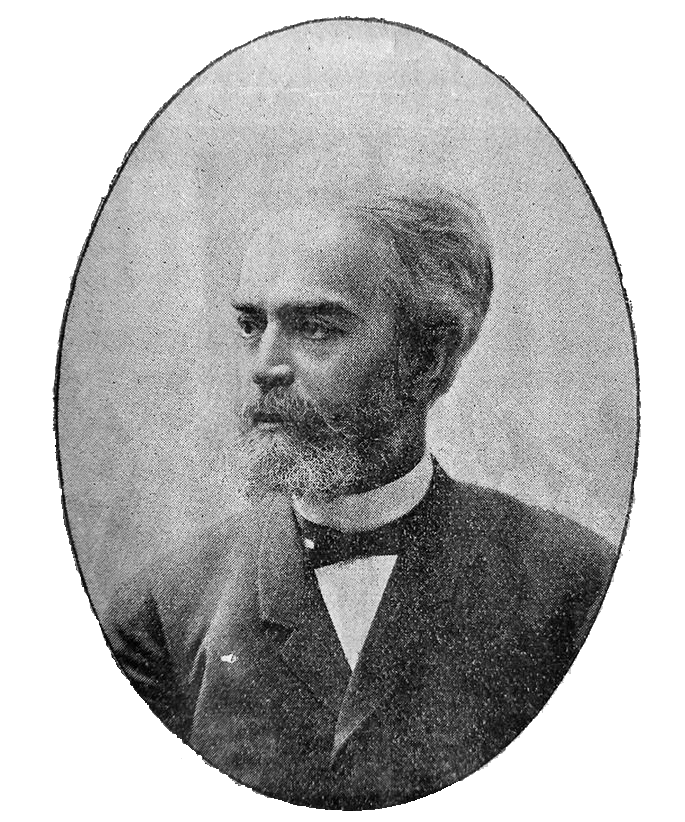
- Born: 1839
- Died: 1909 (aged about 70)

Ivan Timofeevich Golenishchev-Kutuzov (Russian: Ива́н Тимофе́евич Голени́щев-Куту́зов; 1839 – 8 (21) August 1909) was a Russian businessman and statesman; mayor of Kharkiv from 1893 to 1900.

While serving in the Russian army, he joined a secret organization that supported the Polish revolutionaries, and after his exposure he was dismissed. He moved to Kharkiv, where he later became an influential businessman and public figure. He leaned towards conservative-monarchical views and was the leader of the “noble party” in local politics. Golenishchev-Kutuzov twice won the election of the mayor of Kharkiv, but during the second term he had a conflict with members of the city council to leave office early. During his presidency, several important enterprises were established in Kharkiv. He paid great attention to environmental issues, made a report at the II All-Russian Congress of Forest Owners and Forestry, and was engaged in the landscaping of Kharkiv, including opening parks and gardens.

== See also ==
- List of mayors of Kharkiv
