= Kharkiv Metro =

Rapid transit system in Kharkiv, Ukraine

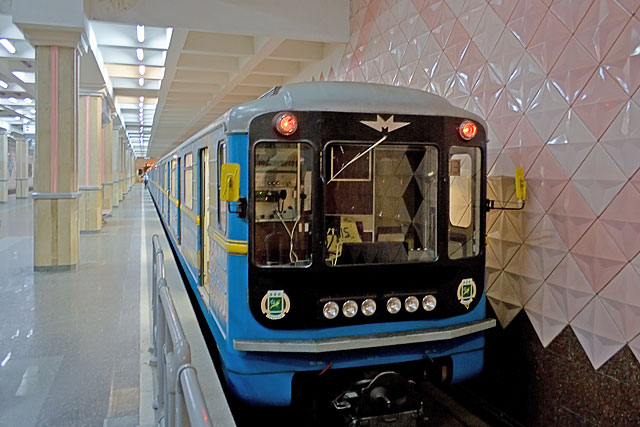
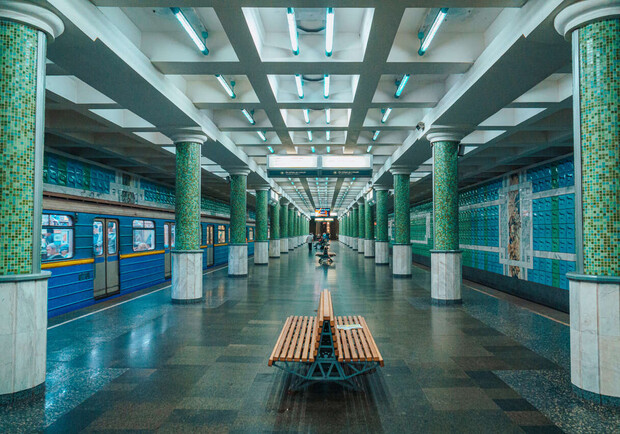
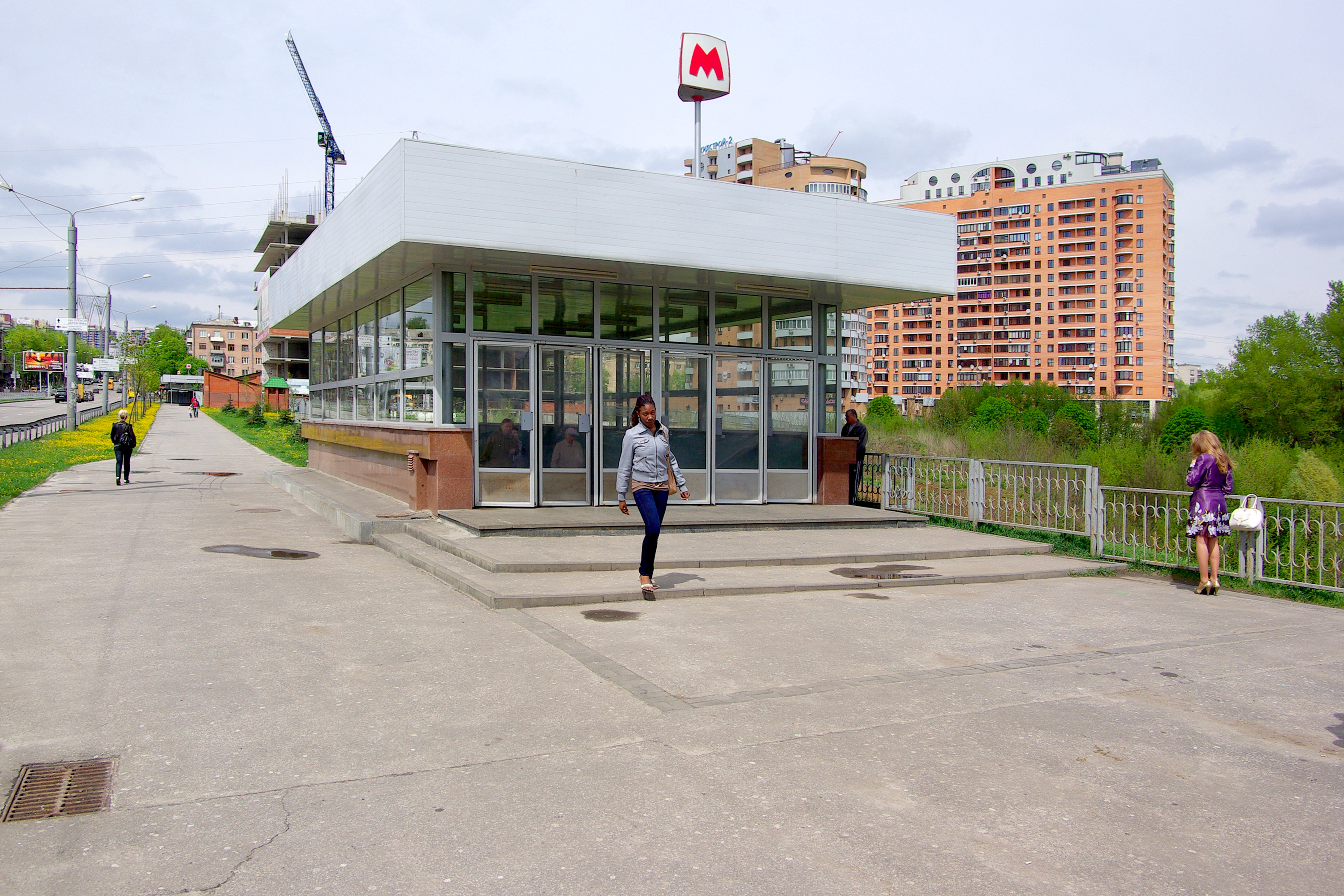
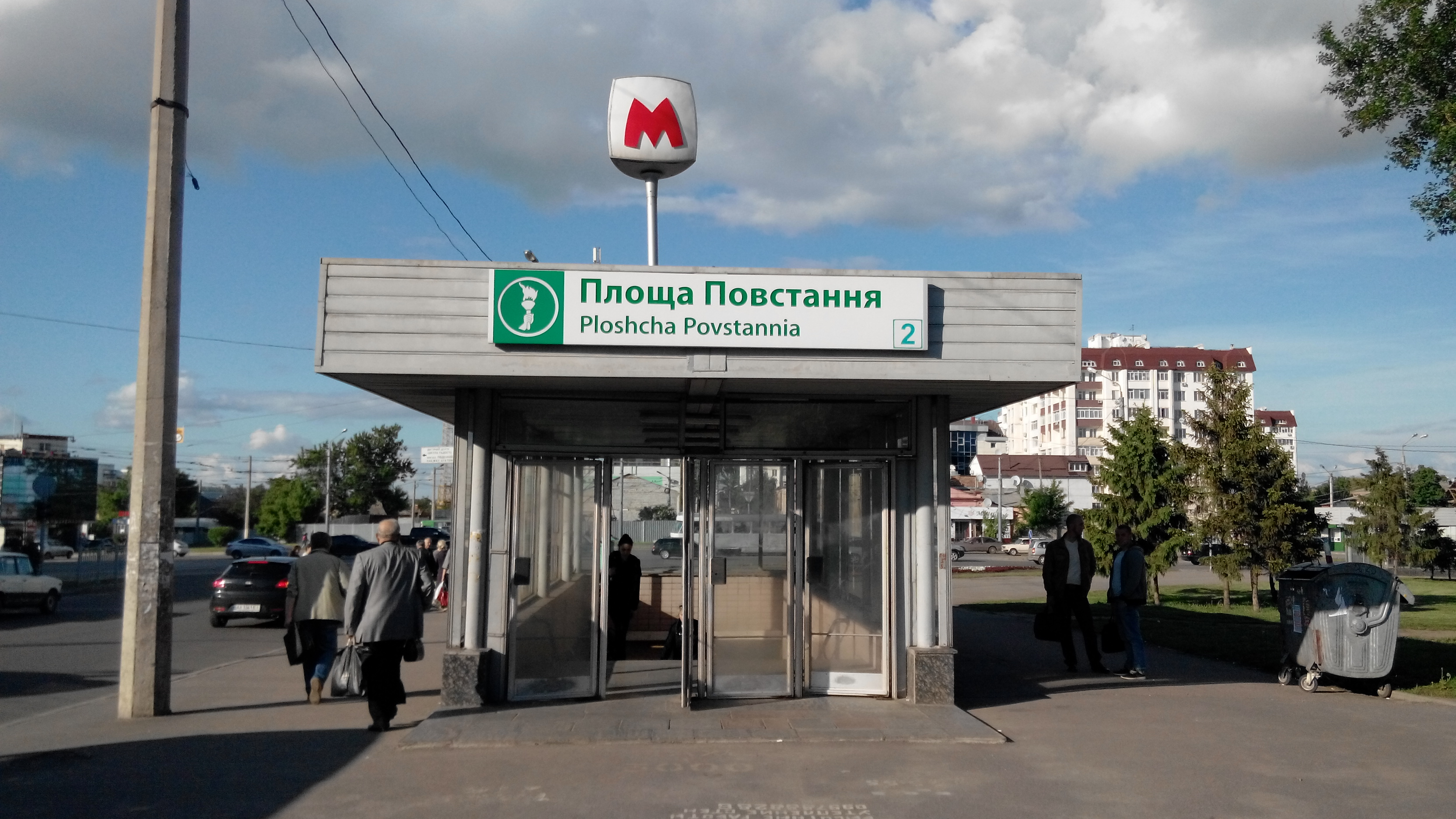
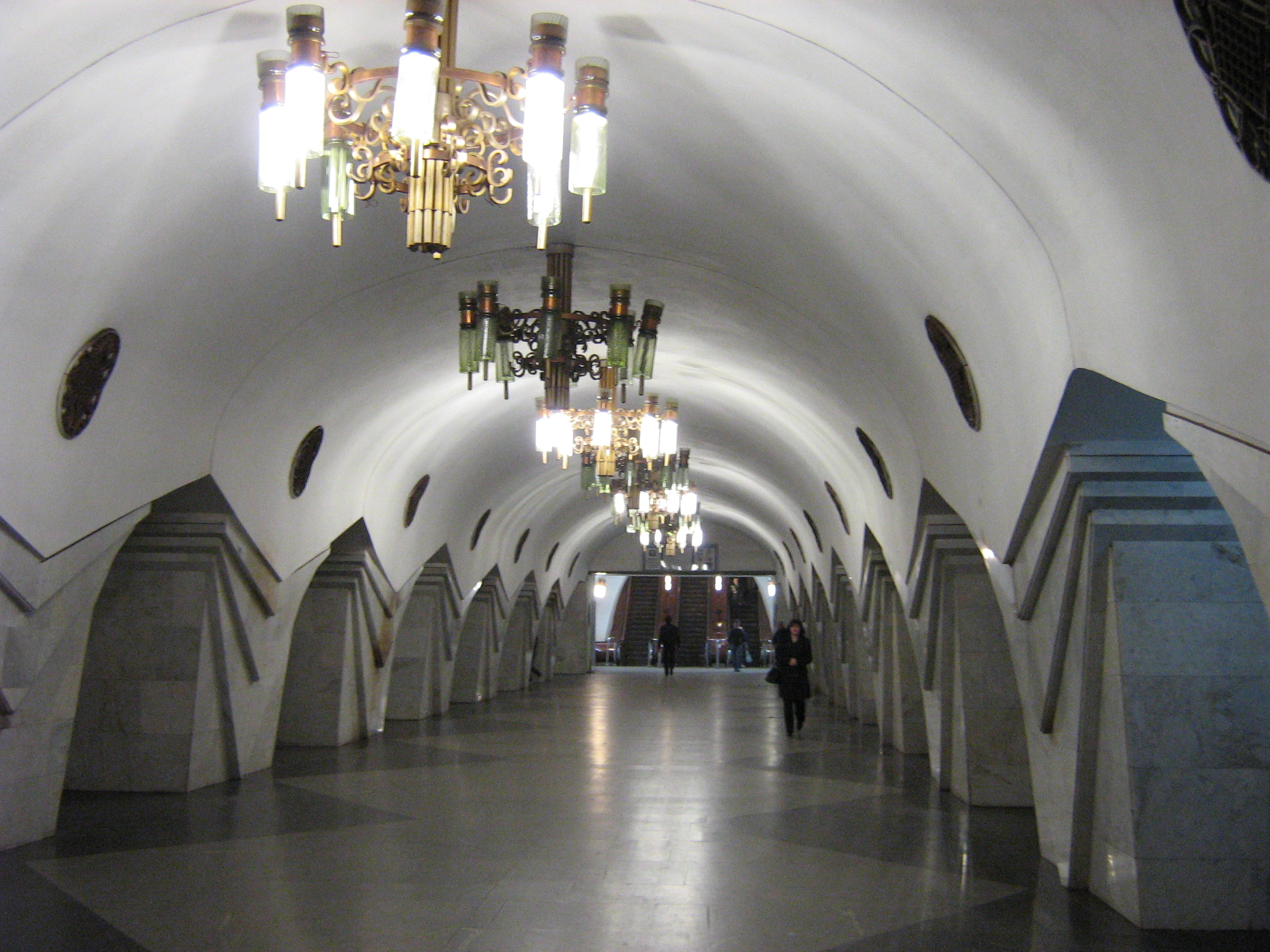
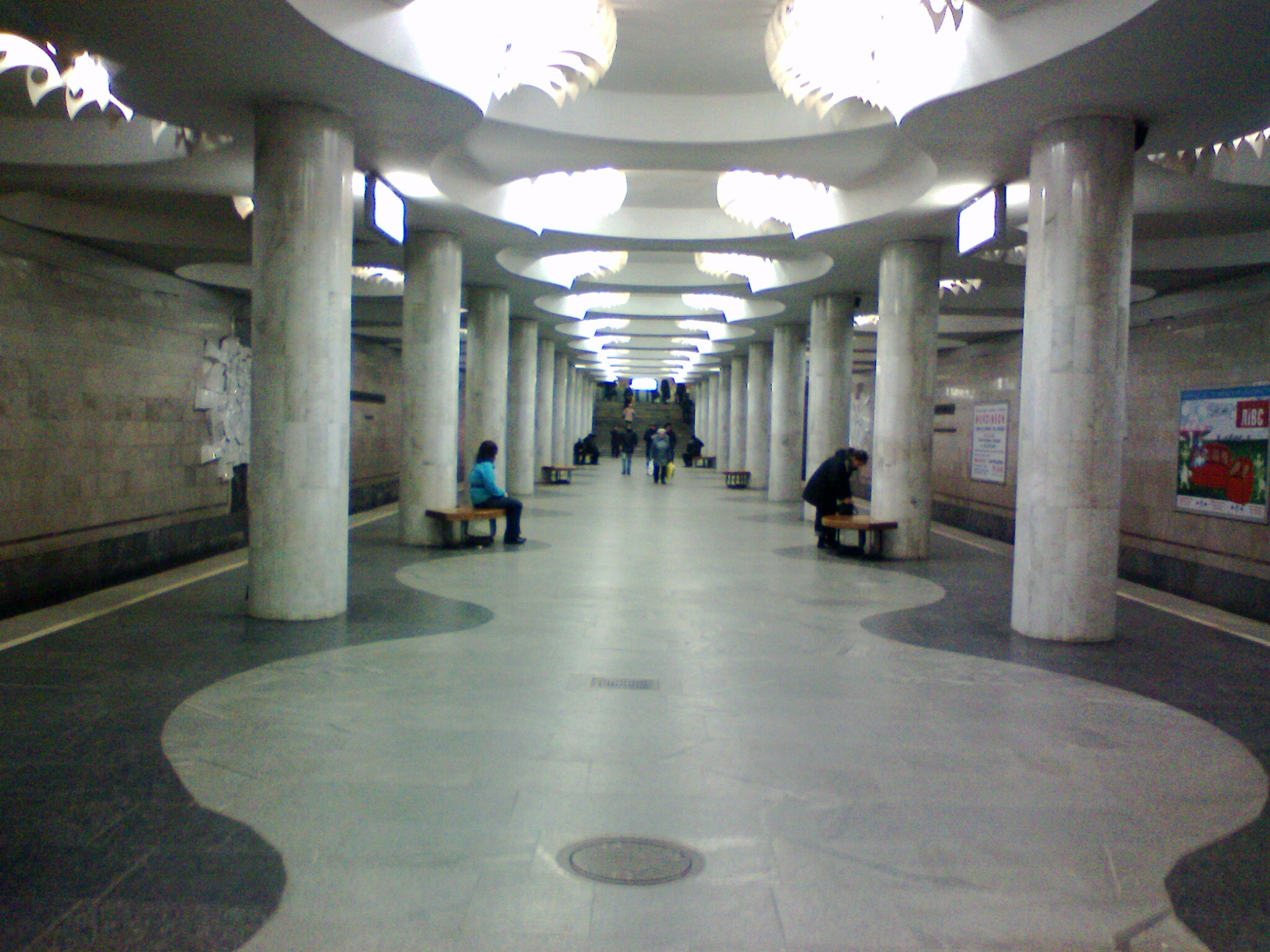
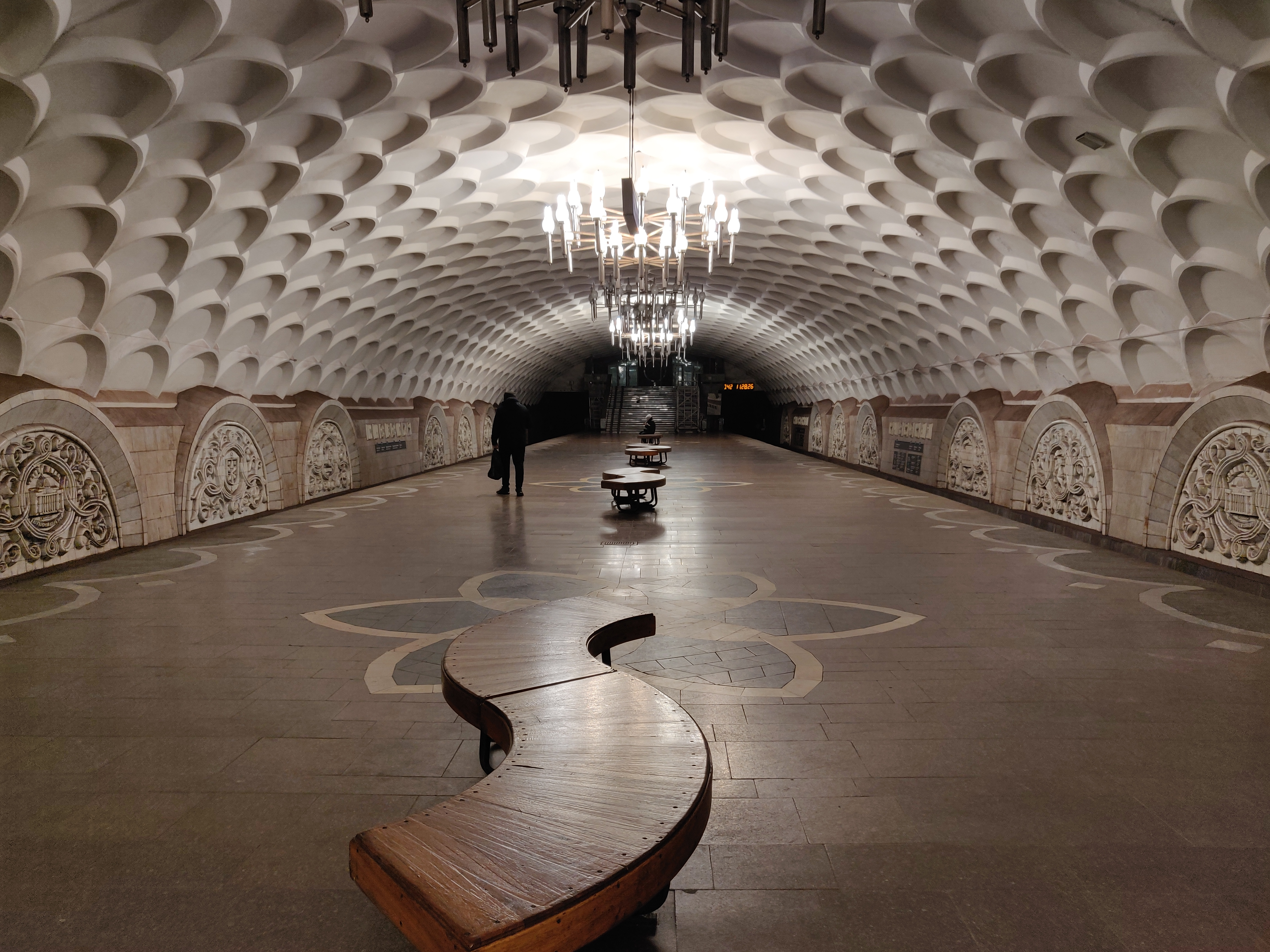
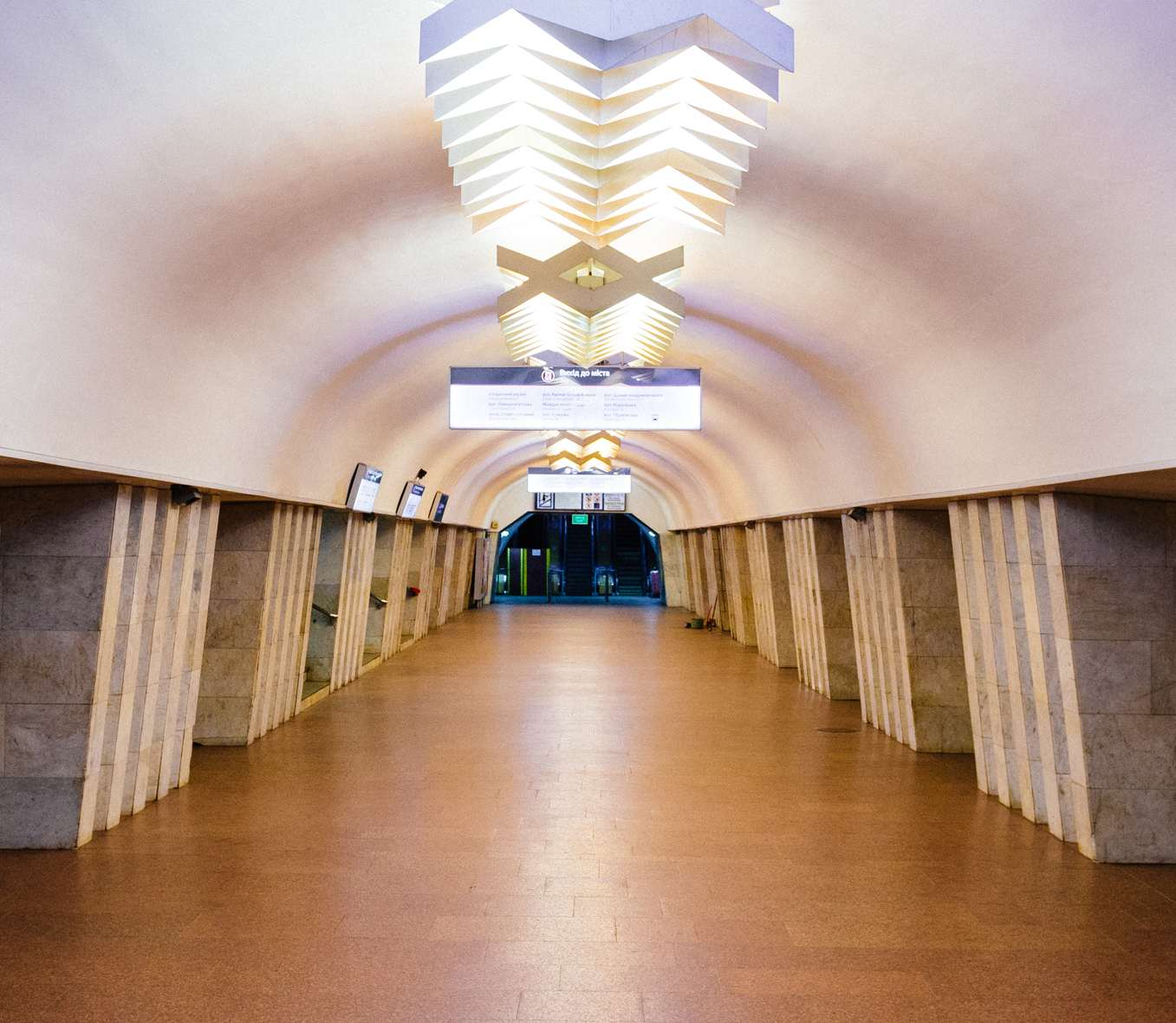
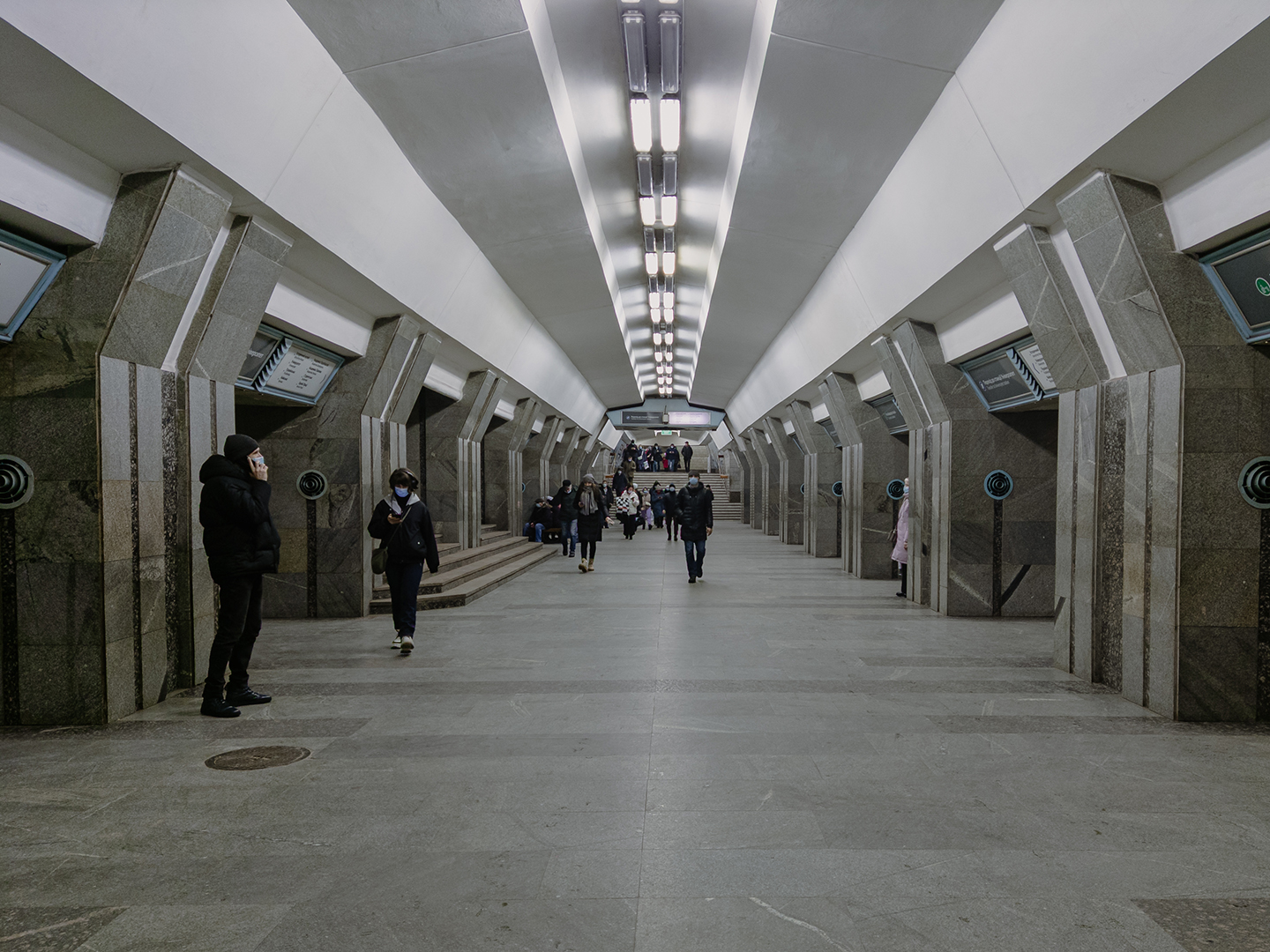
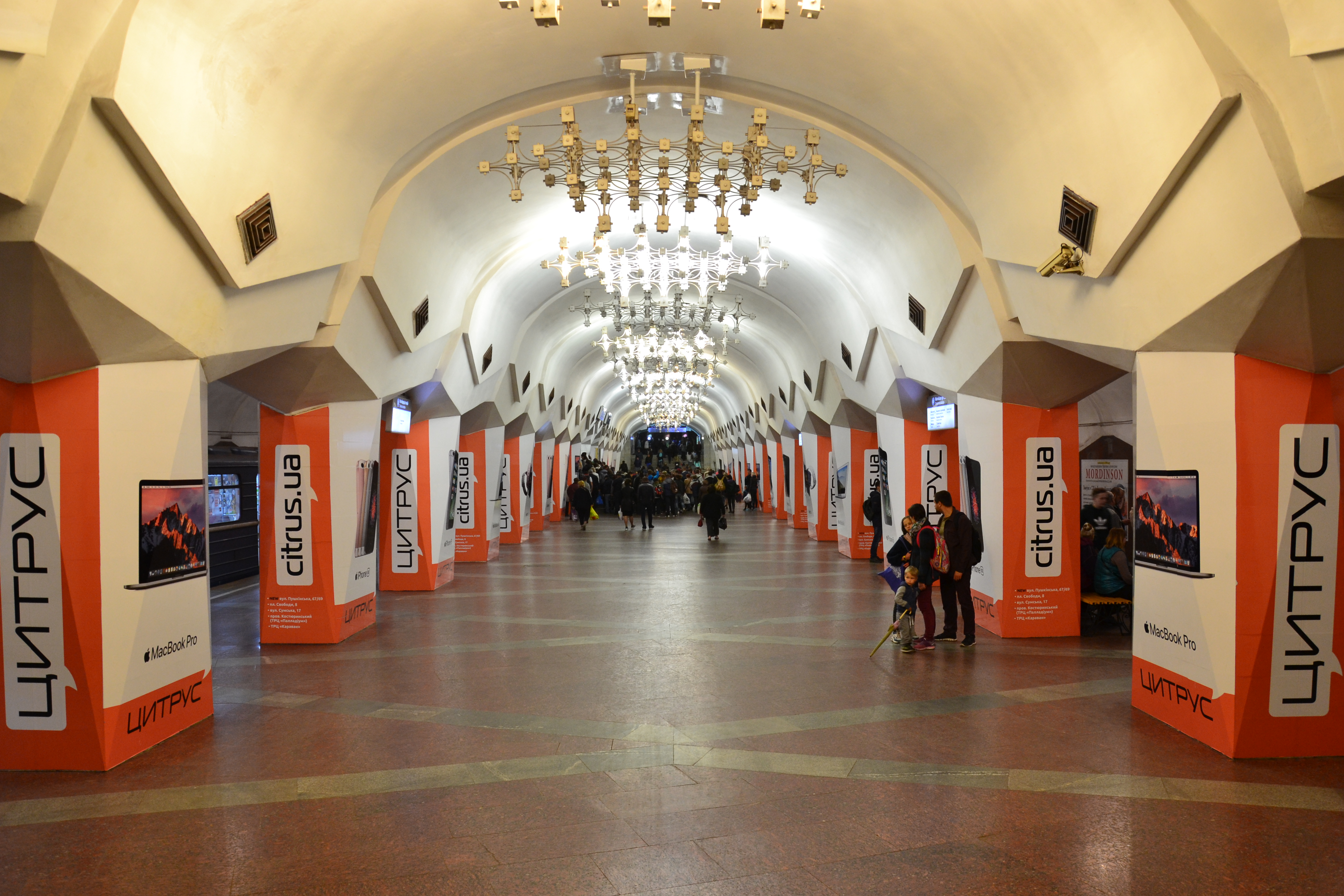
- Stations of Kharkiv Metro

Overview
- Native name: Харківський метрополітен Kharkivskyi Metropoliten
- Owner: City of Kharkiv
- Locale: Kharkiv, Ukraine
- Transit type: Rapid transit
- Number of lines: 3
- Number of stations: 30 (2 under construction)
- Daily ridership: ▼383,560 (2020 average)
- Annual ridership: ▼231.1 million (2020)
- Chief executive: Oleksii Luka
- Headquarters: 29 Rizdviana Str., Kharkiv
- Website: Kharkiv Metro (in Ukrainian)

Operation
- Began operation: 22 August 1975; 51 years ago
- Operator: Municipal Enterprise Kharkivsky Metropoliten
- Number of vehicles: 326 cars (65 trains)
- Train length: 5 cars
- Headway: Peak hours: 2 - 3 mins Off-peak: 4 - 10 minutes (before 2022)

Technical
- System length: 38.1 km (23.7 mi)
- Track gauge: 1,520 mm (4 ft 11 27/32 in)
- Electrification: Third rail, 825 V DC
- Average speed: 35.6 km/h (22.1 mph)
- Top speed: 80 km/h (50 mph)
System map

The Kharkiv Metro (Ukrainian: Харківське метро or Харківський метрополітен) is a rapid transit system serving the city of Kharkiv. The operational length of its three lines is approximately 38.1 km (23.7 mi). The system comprises 30 stations, including three underground interchange hubs located in the city center. The system transported 223 million passengers in 2018 (up from 212.85 million in 2017).

Following its opening on 23 August (Note: The official opening ceremony was held on 22 August, with the Metro system being opened to the general public on 23 August.) 1975, the Kharkiv Metro became the sixth metro system in the USSR (after the Moscow Metro, Leningrad Metro, Kyiv Metro, Tbilisi Metro, and Baku Metro) and the second in Ukraine.

The metro system is owned by the municipal enterprise Kharkiv Metro, established in 2009 through the reorganization of the former state enterprise Kharkiv Metro.

The company employs 2,120 workers (as of 2012). It operates two electric depots: TCh-1 "Nemyshlianske" and TCh-2 "Saltivske".

The primary source of financial revenue is its core activity — passenger transportation. Additional income is generated from non-core activities, including leasing retail space and advertising areas, advertising services (such as station monitors and station branding), as well as subsidies and compensatory payments from the municipal and state budgets.

During the Soviet period, the metro was named after Vladimir Lenin.

Kharkiv Metro operations were suspended on 17 March 2020 to prevent COVID-19 spread. To compensate for the lack of a metro, the city administration implemented a series of changes in the tram, trolleybus, and bus routes of the city. The metro was reopened on 25 May 2020; face masks or respirators were mandated to wear for passengers.

From 24 February to 24 May 2022, following the beginning of the full-scale Russian invasion of Ukraine, metro services were temporarily suspended, and stations were used as bomb shelters. Since May 2022, the metro has been operating normally.

== History ==
=== Background ===
Timelapse of Kharkiv Metro construction (in Ukrainian)

After the end of the World War II, Kharkiv underwent large-scale reconstruction, including extensive new construction. Numerous new residential districts were built, significantly increasing the city’s population. By the end of 1962, the city’s area exceeded 30,000 hectares, and its population surpassed 1 million residents.

As early as the 1950s, Kharkiv operated a large number of bus routes, along with well-developed tram and trolleybus networks equipped with modern rolling stock. Nevertheless, significant transportation problems continued to intensify.

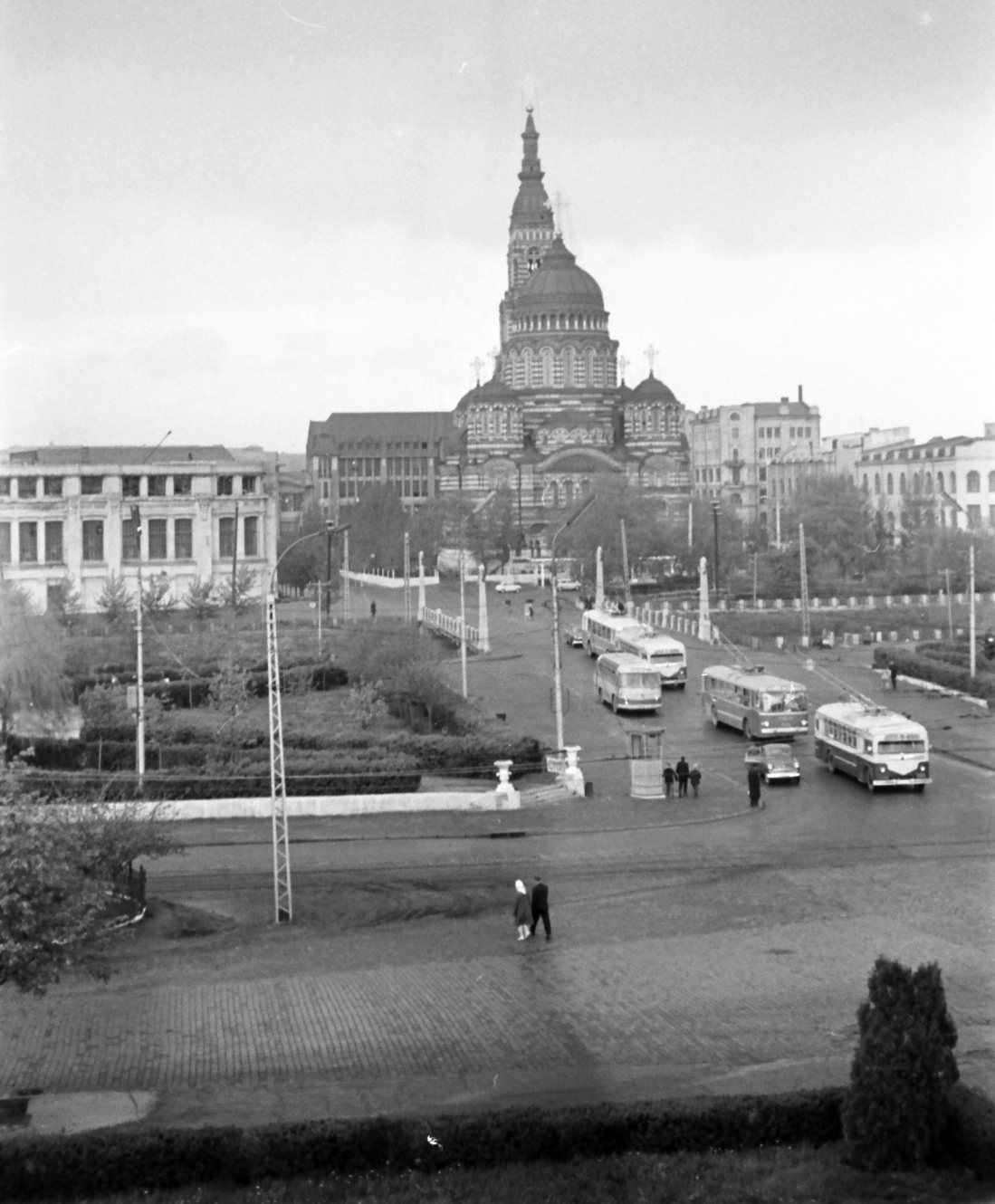
Kharkiv in the 1960s; view of the Annunciation Cathedral

In the late 1950s and early 1960s, the city underwent major changes in the layout of residential districts and industrial zones. Rapid population growth, intensive migration to newly developed housing areas, and a natural increase in mobility created serious challenges for passenger transportation. These issues highlighted the shortcomings of the city’s planning, as well as its street, road, and transport networks, which had developed historically.

The city’s radial layout, with narrow, winding streets lined with multi-story buildings, combined with its highly varied terrain—meandering rivers, deep ravines, and steep elevations—made it impossible to achieve a significant improvement in passenger transport using conventional surface transit. Considering the urgent need to ensure conditions for the normal functioning and development of Kharkiv and its agglomeration, the idea of constructing a high-capacity, rapid, off-street transport system was proposed—one that could bring residential districts closer in travel time to workplaces and the city center.

Calculations carried out by the Kharkivproekt Institute showed that neither a high-speed tram nor a monorail could adequately solve the city’s transport problems. Only a metro system could handle existing and projected passenger flows while maintaining sufficiently high travel speeds. The greatest challenge for urban transport was ensuring passenger movement along the city’s west–east axis, where the largest industrial enterprises, major residential districts, main nodes of suburban and intercity railway and road connections, and the central city area are located.

On 12 December 1962, at a session of the Supreme Soviet of the USSR, Mykola Sobol, the First Secretary of the Kharkiv Regional Committee of the Communist Party of Ukraine, proposed:

The construction of a metro system in Kharkiv has become a pressing necessity. We request support for our proposal, including the initiation of design work in 1963 and the start of construction of the first phase of the Kharkiv Metro in 1965–1966. At the same time, we ask that, during the preparation and construction period, Kharkiv be allocated a significantly larger number of vehicles to replenish its bus, trolleybus, and tram fleets.

— Mykola Sobol

At first, the process was repeatedly delayed, but there was a general understanding that a metro system needed to be built in Kharkiv. The idea was most actively promoted by Hryhoriy Vashchenko, Sobol’s successor as First Secretary, who raised the issue with the party leadership and secured approval. Soon after, Ruvim Lyubarsky, who later became the chief engineer for the technical and economic justification of the Kharkiv Metro, promoted the idea at the Kharkiv Metalist Palace of Culture. His presentations were highly successful, and the concept of the new construction gained popularity among the city’s residents. Previously, he had participated in the development of master plans for 20 cities in the USSR, as well as in the planning project for Kharkiv Oblast.

Three options for the new transport system were considered: a monorail, a high-speed tram, and a metro. The first option was immediately ruled out—Kharkiv’s complex urban layout, narrow streets, and tall buildings made it impossible to build a monorail. Based on this, the State Committee for Construction tasked the Kharkiv branch of the Giprogorad Institute (now Dipromisto) with preparing a “Consideration on the Necessity of Building a Metro”.

By 20 March 1963, the Executive Committee of the Kharkiv City Council approved the submitted drawings and proposals. Its conclusions, together with the engineers’ plans, were sent to the Central Committee of the Communist Party of Ukraine. The party leadership took interest in the idea and instructed the State Construction Committee of the Ukrainian SSR to prepare letters to the Central Committee of the CPSU and the Council of Ministers of the USSR. On the basis of the ministers’ instructions, the Gosplan issued a proposal, but it concerned the construction of a high-speed tram in the city rather than a metro.

Kharkiv’s engineers and residents did not expect this turn of events. A high-speed tram would not have accommodated the growing passenger flows, its speed would not have been particularly high, and its construction would have required enormous funds. However, it was impossible to directly declare the absurdity of this idea, so the city’s engineers began presenting detailed arguments about the inefficiency of such a transport system and the necessity of building a metro.

Subsequently, the Derzhplan of the Ukrainian SSR instructed Kharkivproekt and other organizations to prepare a technical and economic report, which was completed. Later, the project was joined by the Institute of Complex Transport Problems under the USSR State Planning Committee, the Ministry of Transport Construction, the USSR State Planning Committee, and other institutes. Based on the results of this work, on 17 December 1965, the Council of Ministers of the USSR tasked the Ministry of Transport Construction with developing, in 1966, a construction plan for the first phase of the Kharkiv Metro—from Kharkiv-Pasazhyrskyi railway station to the Tile Factory, covering a distance of 20 km. This route was chosen because the greatest challenges for urban transport were the movement of workers to large industrial enterprises. The route also included the railway station and several bus terminals.

=== Design and planning ===
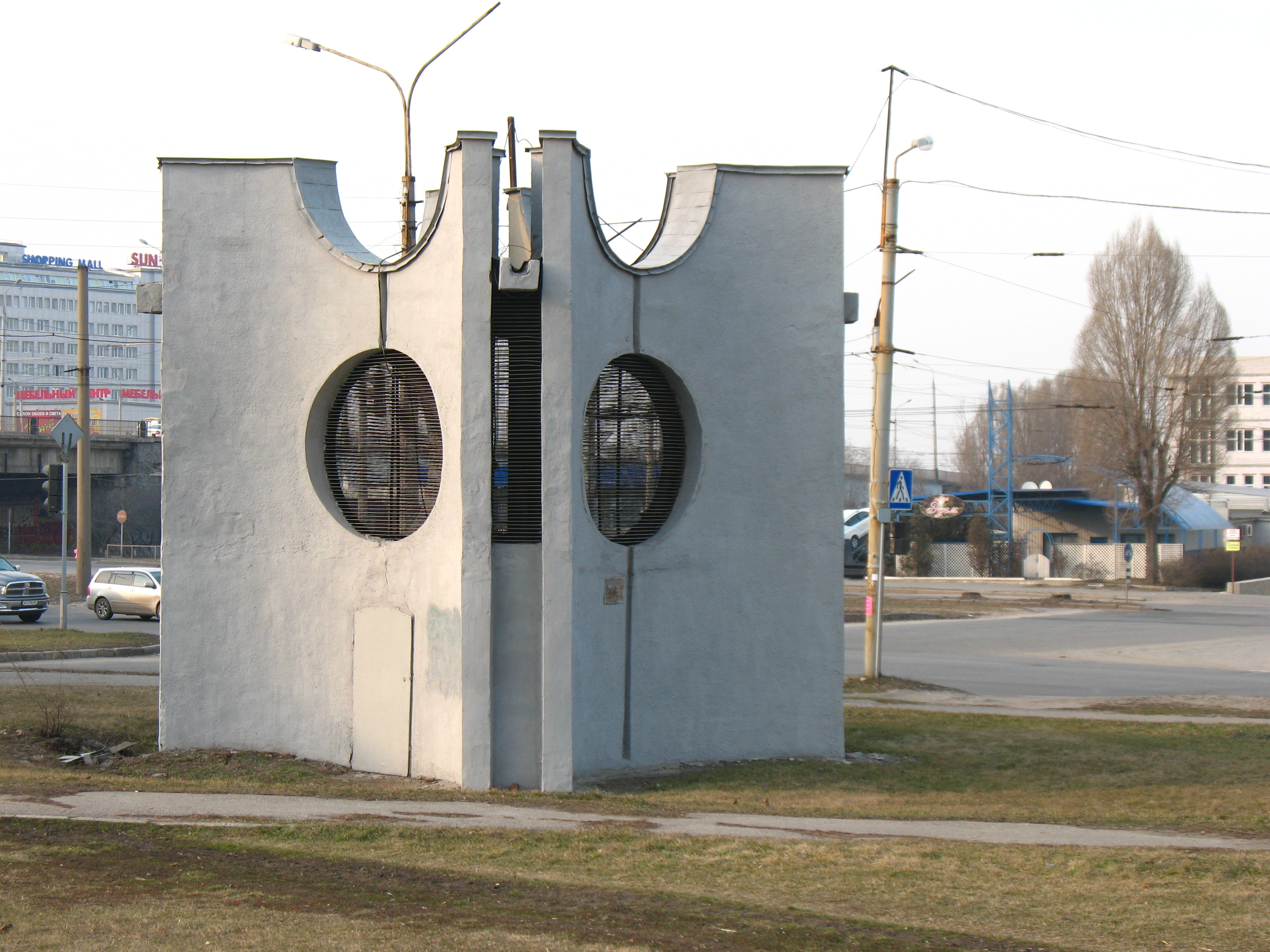
Ventilation shaft of the Kharkiv Metro, Heroiv Kharkova Avenue, Turboatom Station

Control over the planned construction was assumed by the Central Committee of the Communist Party of Ukraine and the Council of Ministers of the Ukrainian SSR. By a resolution dated 25 January 1966, they tasked the Kharkiv Regional Committee of the CPU and the Regional Executive Committee, together with the Ministry of Transport Construction, to ensure the development of construction plans for the first phase of the metro.

The general design organization was assigned to the Metrogiprotrans Institute, with Mykola Bychkov appointed as the chief engineer. Other institutions also participated in designing the future line, including Khargiprotrans, Kyivmetproekt, Kharkivproekt, and approximately 30 others in total.

According to the technical and economic justification prepared by the Kharkivproekt Institute with the participation of Kyivmetproekt and Khargiprotrans teams, the route of the first phase of the Kharkiv Metro was planned along the city’s busiest diameter. The chief engineer of the metro’s feasibility study was R. E. Lyubarsky, Candidate of Technical Sciences, and the chief engineer of the design assignment was N. N. Bychkov.

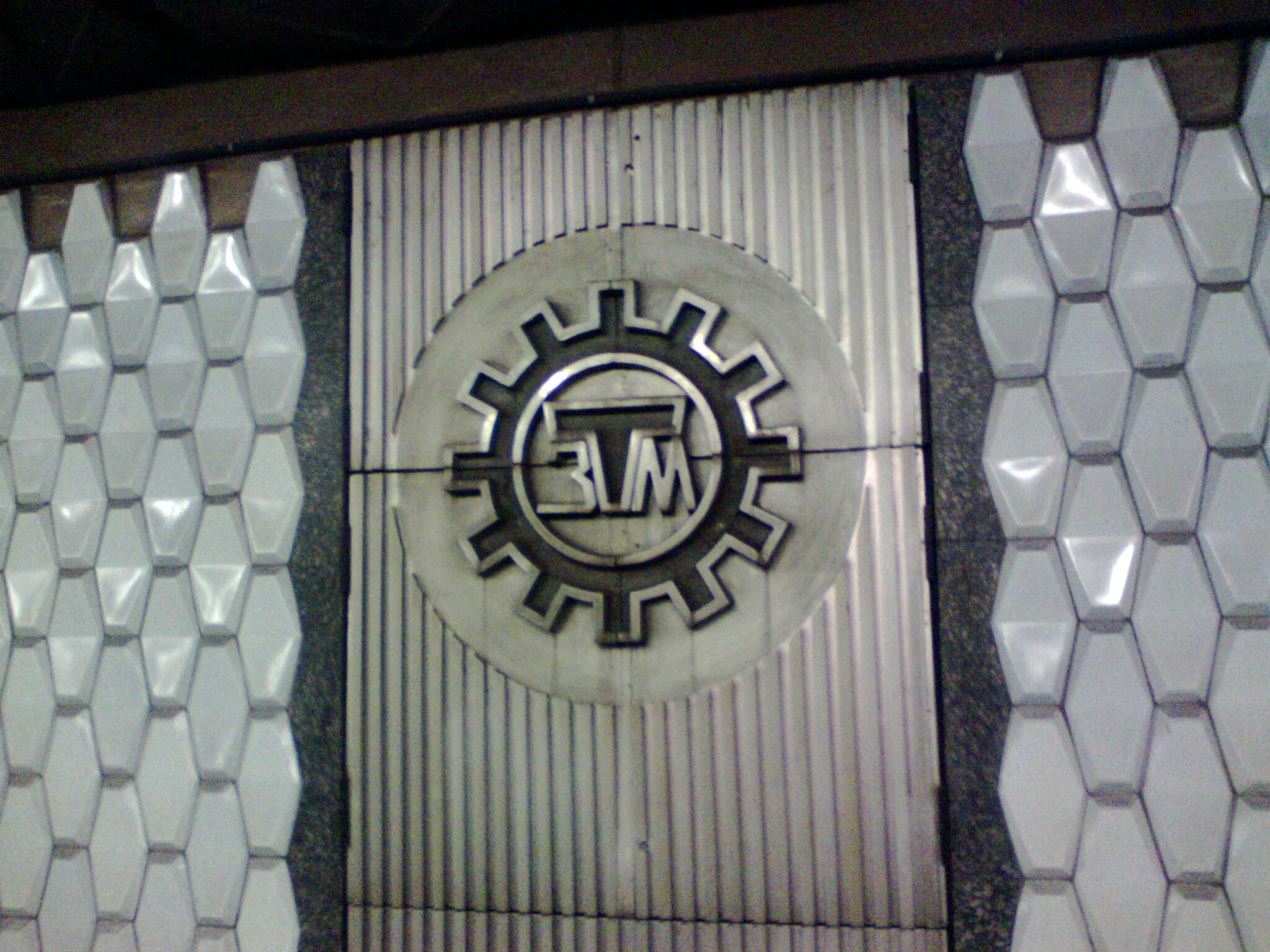
Logo of the Malyshev Factory at Zavodska Station

On 31 December 1965, at a meeting of the Bureau of the Kharkiv City Committee of the Communist Party of Ukraine and the Executive Committee of the Kharkiv City Council, the “Architectural and Planning Assignment for the Future Construction of the First Phase of the Metro in Kharkiv” was adopted. Initially, it was planned to open stations at 13 of the city’s busiest locations: Pivdennyi Vokzal, Komunalnyi Market, City Center, Levada, Central Stadium, Malyshev Factory, Turbine Factory, Kondytsioner Factory, Santekhzavod, Pivdenkabel Factory, KhTZ, Elektrotyazhmash, and the Tile Factory.

Even at the initial stage of planning, the future challenges became clear. Specialists from Metrogiprotrans noted that constructing shallow tunnels beneath the historic railway station building, with its two dozen mainline tracks, would be difficult, as would tunneling under the Lopan and Kharkiv rivers and the historic city center. The Kharkiv-Pasazhyrskyi station building was situated on weak clay soils, and its preservation was not guaranteed. Additionally, a site for an electric depot near the end of the first launch section had to be found. Ultimately, it was decided to extend the metro line toward Kholodna Hora, with the terminus at Sverdlov Street (now Poltavskyi Shlyakh), while the other end of the line was placed near the Elektrotyazhmash Factory.

The production of cartographic materials involved the Kharkivproekt Institute, the office of the chief architect, and the UkrNDIINTV Institute. Engineering and geological surveys were conducted by Ukrburvod, the Kharkiv Complex Geological Expedition of the Dniprogeology Trust, Khargiprotrans, Hydroproject, Teploelektroproekt, Pivdenhiproshakht, Pivdenhiproruda, Transvodobud, PromtransNDIproekt, Giprotraktorosilhospmash, Giprostal, KharkivGDINTI, VodokanalNDIproekt, and Ukrnaftogazrozvidka. Testing also involved Giprotsement and Ukrhiprokomunbud. Design work on external engineering networks, the reorganization of underground utilities, site development, and tram track relocation was carried out by Kharkivproekt, Energomerezproekt, and Ukrhiprokomunbud, together with specialists from the city’s municipal services.

In spring 1966, drilling began to study the soils and their characteristics. Initial sites were located at Kholodna Hora, the Southern Railway Station, and Teveleva Square (now Constitution Square). Later, work continued along other parts of the line. Geological survey data were provided to the designers. According to the initial plan, the “Komunalnyi Market” station was to be located near the Annunciation Cathedral, and the “Center” station near the Central Restaurant. However, local hydrogeological conditions proved unfavorable. During adjustments, it was decided to extend the western part of the line to Kholodna Hora and place the terminus at Sverdlov Street (now Poltavskyi Shlyakh), move the “Komunalnyi Market” station closer to the market near the Budynok “Odiah” building (now the House of Trade), and place the “Center” station in the northern part of Teveleva Square. On 29 April 1966, these adjustments were approved at a technical meeting of the Kharkiv City Council, attended by members of the regional and city party committees and heads of contractor organizations.

In 1967, Metrogiprotrans developed plans considering two options for metro construction: a standard urban metro and a version allowing trains to operate on suburban railway sections. The latter would primarily connect the Zalyutyne district with the Liubotyn and Zolochiv directions, and in the east link to the “Loseve” station with access to the Chuhuiv direction. This option would have required new rolling stock, larger-diameter tunnels, and longer platforms. Experience with such projects in the USSR was limited, whereas conventional metro systems already operated in Moscow, Leningrad, and Kyiv.

Based on earlier calculations, by 1980 it was planned to build 45 km of track. The cost of a combined city–suburban system was estimated at 149.3 million rubles, while a conventional metro would cost 216.9 million rubles. The combined option had a lower budget and shorter payback period, so it was chosen. Its advantages included convenience, allowing suburban residents to reach the city without transfers. However, detailed planning revealed drawbacks. The main issue was developing a new model of electric trains, assigned to the Rīgas vagonbūves rūpnīca, which would not be ready for mass production for another 6–7 years, while Kharkiv needed an urgent solution. First Secretary of the Regional Committee of the CPU, Hryhoriy Vashchenko, successfully defended the idea of an internal metro before USSR Premier Alexei Kosygin. Following this, the Politburo of the CPU Central Committee approved the conventional metro option, followed by the State Construction Committee’s Chief Expertise Administration. It was noted that an internal metro would allow the use of proven trains and ensure uninterrupted service. In February 1967, the Council of Ministers of the Ukrainian SSR submitted the design assignment to the Council of Ministers of the USSR.

According to the 1967 plans, the second phase would include part of the Oleksiivska Line, intersecting with the Sverdlovsko-Zavodska Line at the “Center” station, and continuing north with the stations: Shevchenko Garden (now Universytet), Dzerzhinsky Square (now Derzhprom), Mountain Institute (now Naukova), Botanichnyi Sad, Pavlove Pole (now 23 Serpnia), an unnamed station (now Oleksiivska), and Oleksiivka (now Peremoha). The second phase also envisioned the Levada–Airport line, with planned stations: an unnamed station (currently projected as Derzhavynska), Prospekt Haharina (later projected as Kashtanova), Bayrona (currently projected as Odeska), and Osnova (currently projected as Motel Druzhba).

The third phase of the Kharkiv Metro planned the opening of a new line and extensions of existing ones. The Oleksiivska Line was to be extended south with the stations: an unnamed station (currently projected as Ploshcha Urytskoho), Shevchenko Factory (currently projected as Novobavarska), and Novoselivka (currently projected as Novozhanove). Two unnamed stations on the Oleksiivska and Levada lines would be connected via a transfer station Hrekivska. The Sverdlovsko-Zavodska Line was also planned to extend to Zalyutyne in the third phase. The Saltivska Line, at the planning stage, differed from its current layout—it was to run east from Shevchenko Garden without turns and include the stations: KhPI (now Yaroslava Mudroho), Kharkiv Embankment, Zhuravlivka (now slightly north as Kyivska), Akademika Pavlova, Avtostrada, Saltivska, and Sady. However, the connection with “Hrekivska” proved too complex, so both lines were built to intersect at “Center,” and the Saltivska Line was routed northeast rather than east.

=== Construction ===
The decision to build the first phase of the Kharkiv Metro was made on 29 April 1968.

In June 1968, the first metro construction workers arrived in Kharkiv from Baku and Kyiv, along with miners from the Donetsk and Moscow coal basins.

On 15 July 1968, the first shaft was laid on Slovianska Street, near Kharkiv-Pasazhyrskyi station.

On 23 August, to mark the 25th anniversary of Kharkiv’s liberation from the Nazis, excavation work began at the station provisionally named Center (now Maidan Konstytutsii).

By the end of December 1968, the first million rubles had been spent on the construction of the Kharkiv Metro.

By late February 1969, the tunneling crews reached the route of the left running tunnel between the Maidan Konstytutsii and Prospekt Haharina stations.

On 11 August 1969, the first tunneling shield in Kharkiv Metro construction began operation. In August, construction started on the single-vault station “Central Market”.

A major milestone was the first tunnel breakthrough, achieved on 10 April 1970, when the left running tunnel, laid in water-saturated soils from the Podilskyi Bridge, connected with the tunnel at Maidan Konstytutsii station.

In October 1970, the Kharkivmetrobud construction management was established, comprising two construction and installation departments, a construction and installation train relocated from Central Asia, a reinforced concrete plant, a vehicle depot, an operations office, and equipment repair and rental facilities.

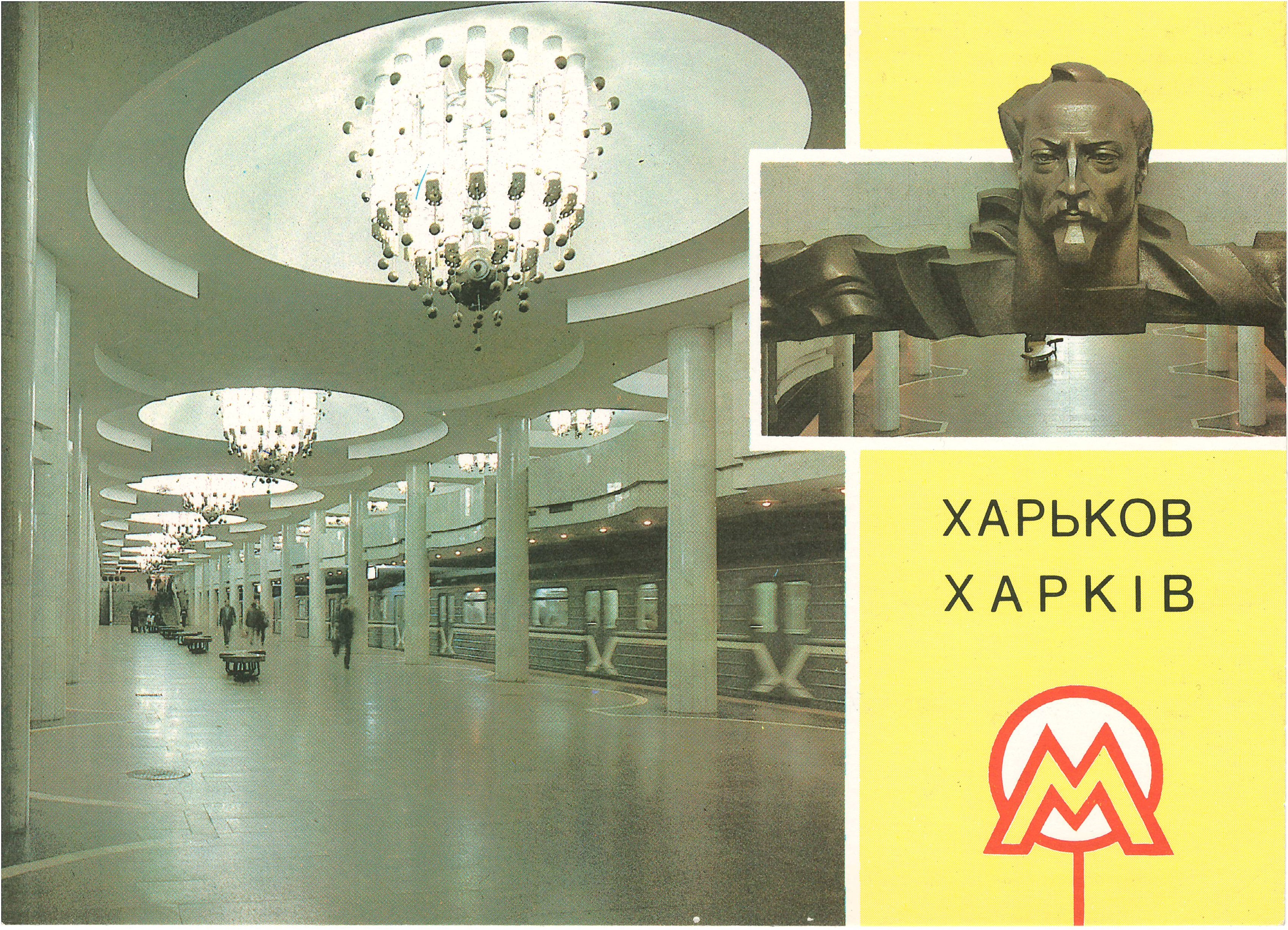
Dzerzhynska Station (now Universytet)

The first test metro train ran along the line on the evening of 30 July 1975. On 21 August, the State Commission signed the acceptance certificate for the first section of the first phase of the Kharkiv Metro, giving it an “excellent” rating. The scale of work completed on the first section included over 23 km of tunnels, eight underground stations of three different types, more than 1.3 million m³ of excavated soil, around 190,000 m³ of reinforced concrete (monolithic and precast), and 31,000 m² of marble and granite. Construction took place under challenging hydrogeological conditions: six stations and 7 km of tunnels were built in quicksand and other water-saturated soils, and tunnels were laid under two rivers, densely populated urban blocks, and heavily trafficked streets.

On 22 August 1975, a large public rally was held at Moskovskyi Prospekt station, where the head of Kharkivmetrobud, H. O. Bratchun, symbolically handed the key to the underground railway to the first head of the Kharkiv Metro, M. Ya. Bessonov. On 23 August 1975, the 32nd anniversary of Kharkiv’s liberation from Nazi forces, the metro doors opened to the public. On its first day, the metro carried 413,000 passengers.

The first phase of the Kharkiv Metro—the Sverdlovsko-Zavodska Line (now Kholodnohirskо-Zavodska Line)—was officially opened on 23 August 1975. The 9.8 km section included eight stations, running from Sverdlova Street (now Kholodna Hora) to Moskovskyi Prospekt (now Turboatom).

=== Early years of operation ===
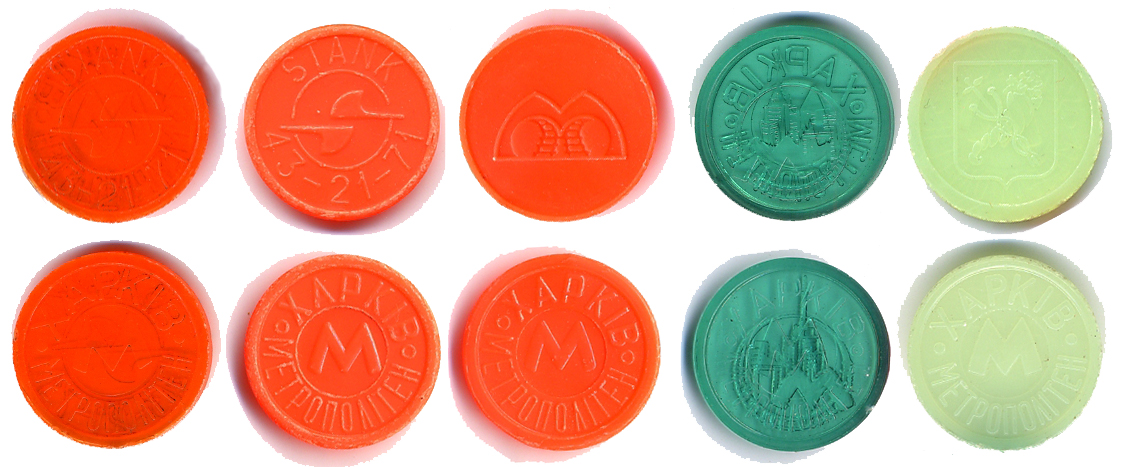
Tokens of the Kharkiv Metro (1975–2012)

By March 1976, the operations team had completed all work to commission and fine-tune the equipment on the first launch section, which fully met the design specifications. Train speeds reached 40.4 km/h, and headways during peak hours were reduced to three minutes. By the end of the first year of operation, the Kharkiv Metro carried an average of around 300,000 passengers per day, accounting for more than 10% of the city’s total urban transport passenger volume.

In October 1986, members of the state commission approved three new metro stations — Akademika Pavlova, Studentska, and Heroiv Pratsi — covering a 3.6 km section. The stations welcomed their first passengers on 23 October 1986.

=== Further construction and passenger traffic ===
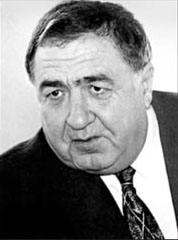
Oleksandr Maselskyi: Chairman of the Kharkiv Regional Executive Committee and namesake of the Imeni O.S. Maselskoho metro station

The Kharkiv Metro continues to carry over 200 million passengers annually. Passenger numbers in selected years are as follows:

Year	Passengers (millions)
2008	282.3
2009	239
2010	247.1
2011	250.1
2018	223

The decision to transfer the state enterprise Kharkiv Metro to municipal ownership of Kharkiv was made on 6 May 2009 at a meeting of the Cabinet of Ministers of Ukraine. However, the Cabinet officially transferred the state enterprise to Kharkiv’s municipal ownership only on 27 August 2009. The metro was formally handed over to the city on 25 September during the signing of the acceptance-transfer act for the consolidated property complex, attended by officials from Kharkiv City Council departments, metro representatives, the Ministry of Transport and Communications of Ukraine, the city BTI, and the trade union.

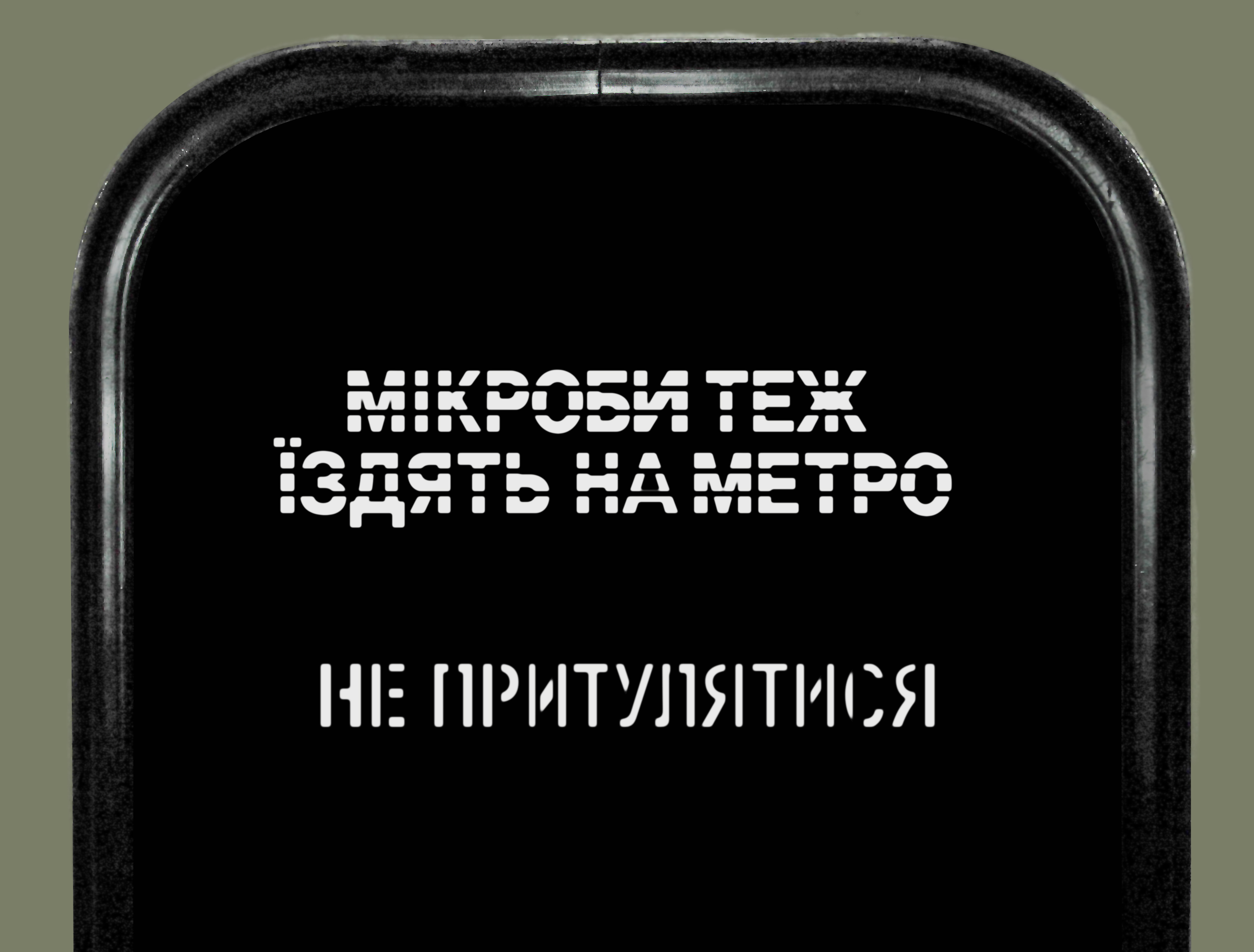
"Microbes also ride the metro" — inscription on the glass of the automatic doors in a Kharkiv Metro train.

The final decision on accepting the metro into municipal ownership was approved by the city council on 30 September, adopting the reorganization by transforming the state enterprise Kharkiv Metro into the municipal enterprise Kharkiv Metro. The metro came under the management of the Department of Transport and Communications of the Kharkiv City Council Executive Committee.

In 2009, the Kharkiv Metro ranked 33rd among 53 metro systems worldwide with an annual passenger flow exceeding 50 million. It also ranked first among state-owned enterprises in Ukraine for “volume of goods and services sold” and was recognized as the “State Enterprise of the Year” for its primary activity under NACE 60.2: “Other land transport activities.”

On 25–26 September 2009, the Southern Railway presented a project for a light rail line in Kharkiv, connecting Kharkiv-Levada railway station with the airport. The line would be 11.4 km long with five stops, and travel time in one direction would be 20 minutes. The project cost is estimated at UAH 600 million, with construction expected to take 1.5–2 years, using both domestic and foreign trams.

=== Modern development ===
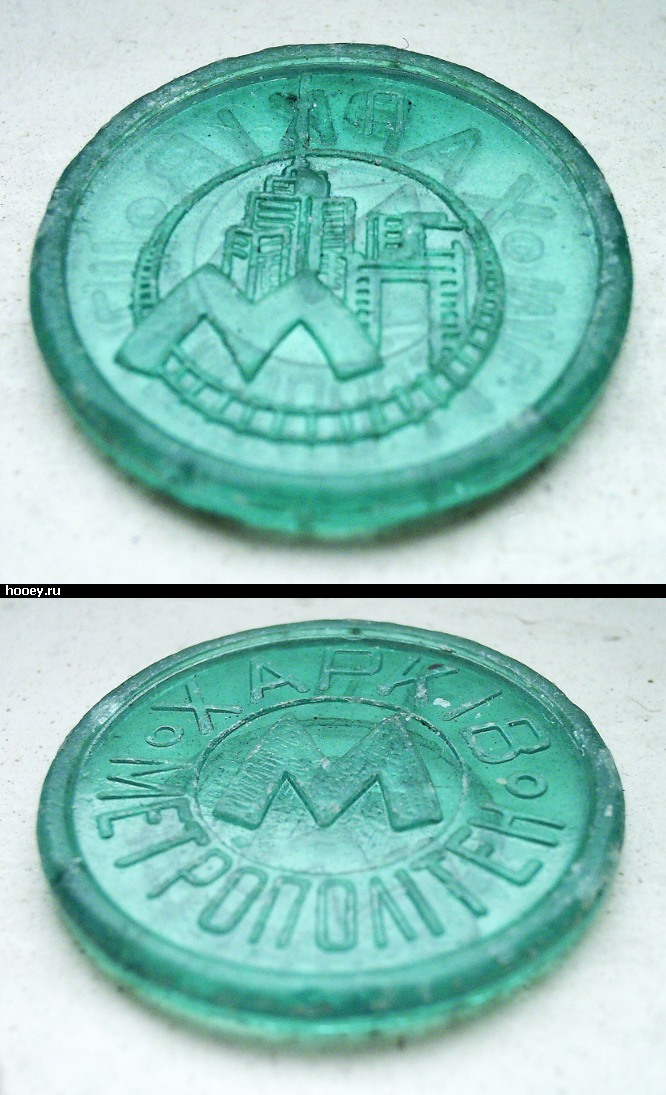
Kharkiv metro token

Since 2016, following the opening of Peremoha station, construction began on the section from Metrobudivnykiv to Odeska. The third section of the Oleksiivska Line, from Metrobudivnykiv to Odeska (to be located at the intersection of Aerospace Avenue and Odeska Street), is being built using an open-cut method with a retaining wall of sleepers.

The Derzhavinska station (to be located on Aerospace Avenue near the intersection of Chuhuivska Street and Zolotoho Lane) is being constructed without disrupting city traffic. Tunnels between Derzhavinska and Odeska stations are planned to be built using a closed tunneling method. The total length of the section under construction toward Odeska is 3.5 km. Each station complex will be 650–700 m long, including platforms, two vestibules, ventilation shafts, and a traction substation.

Upon completion of the third section, the Oleksiivska Line will have a total length of 14.4 km. Daily passenger traffic is expected to reach 40,000 at Derzhavinska and 160,000 at Odeska. Station water supply will be provided via the city’s water networks. The project is funded by the city, with loans from the European Bank for Reconstruction and Development (€160 million) and the European Investment Bank (€160 million).

Construction of the metro toward the airport is planned as an elevated line, with the route built on a viaduct along the median of Aerospace Avenue. In particular, on some sections of this route, underground construction is not feasible due to the high cost of relocating utilities and the desire to avoid demolition of private properties.

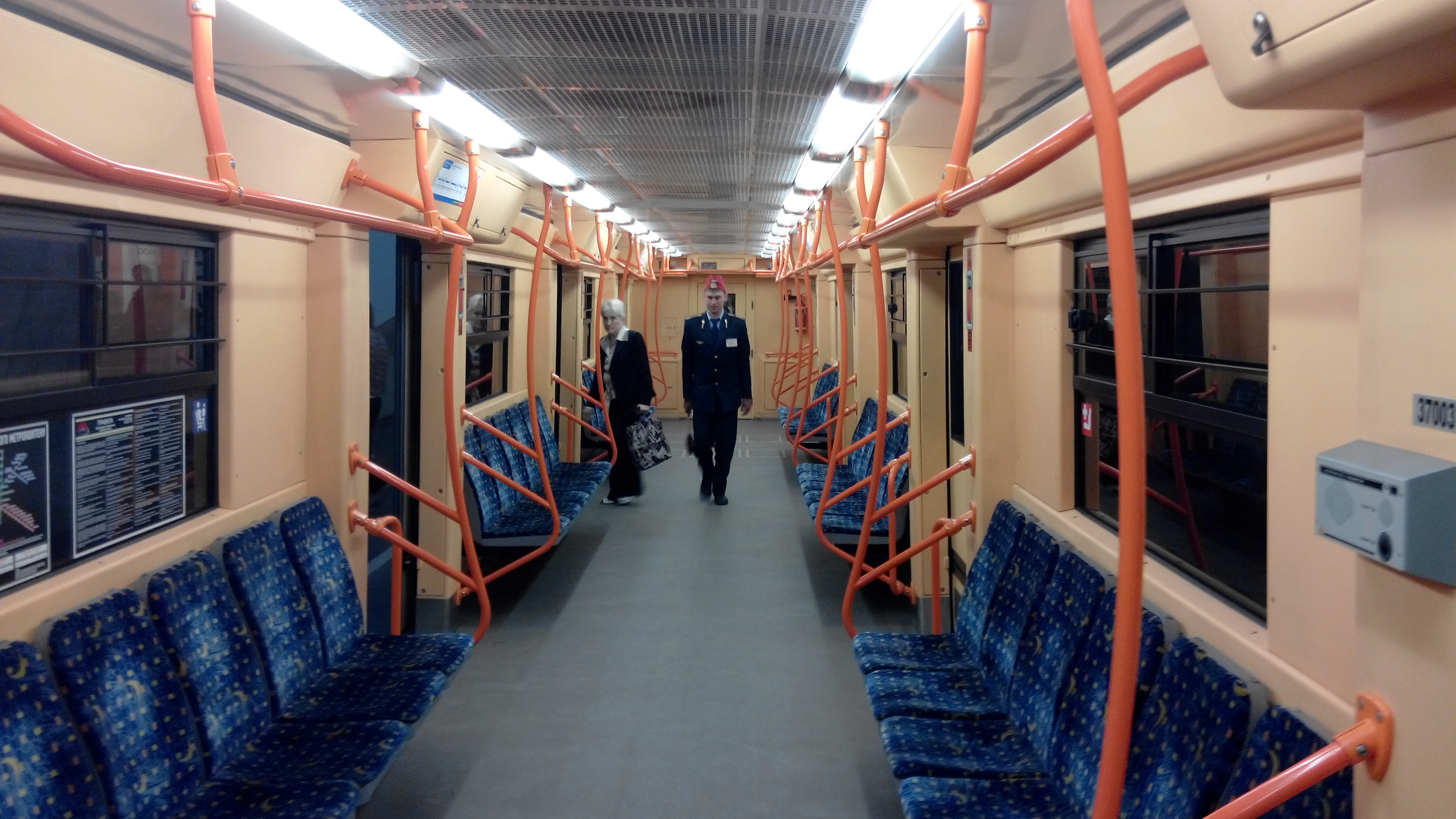
Interior of the 81-7036/7037

In spring 2019, Hyundai Corporation announced its readiness to participate in tenders for the construction of the fifth phase of the Kharkiv Metro’s third line, the Oleksiivske depot, and the procurement of 85 metro cars.

In 2020, Chinese manufacturer CRRC Tangshan was selected as the winner of a contract to supply eight five-car trainsets for the Kharkiv metro, which were scheduled for delivery in 2022. The trains were to be 96.7 m long and 2,700 mm wide with a maximum speed of 80 km/h. The €45m deal announced on 27 May includes the provision of spare parts, tools and support services.

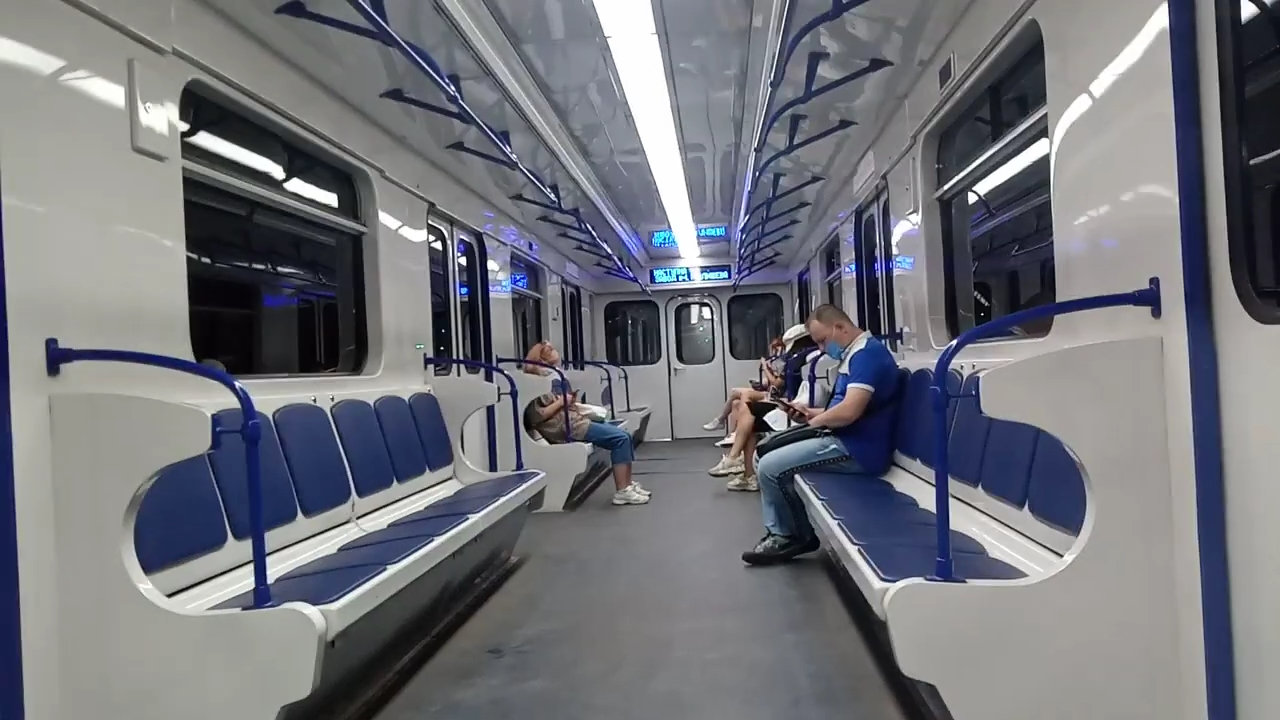
Interior of the upgraded Ezh3

As of March 2020, the city had already completed two running tunnels of the connecting branch between Peremoha station and the future depot, with a total length of 202 m, and carried out landscaping above these tunnels. The city is clearing the area for metro construction. The site for Odeska station is already prepared, and demolition and waste removal at the future Derzhavinska station are scheduled to be completed by April. The construction projects for both new stations have been approved, passed state and environmental expertise, and are ready for international tenders to select the general contractor.

Kharkiv Metro operations were suspended on 17 March 2020 to prevent COVID-19 spread. To compensate for the lack of a metro, the city administration implemented a series of changes in the tram, trolleybus, and bus routes of the city. The metro was reopened on 25 May 2020; face masks or respirators were mandated to wear for passengers.

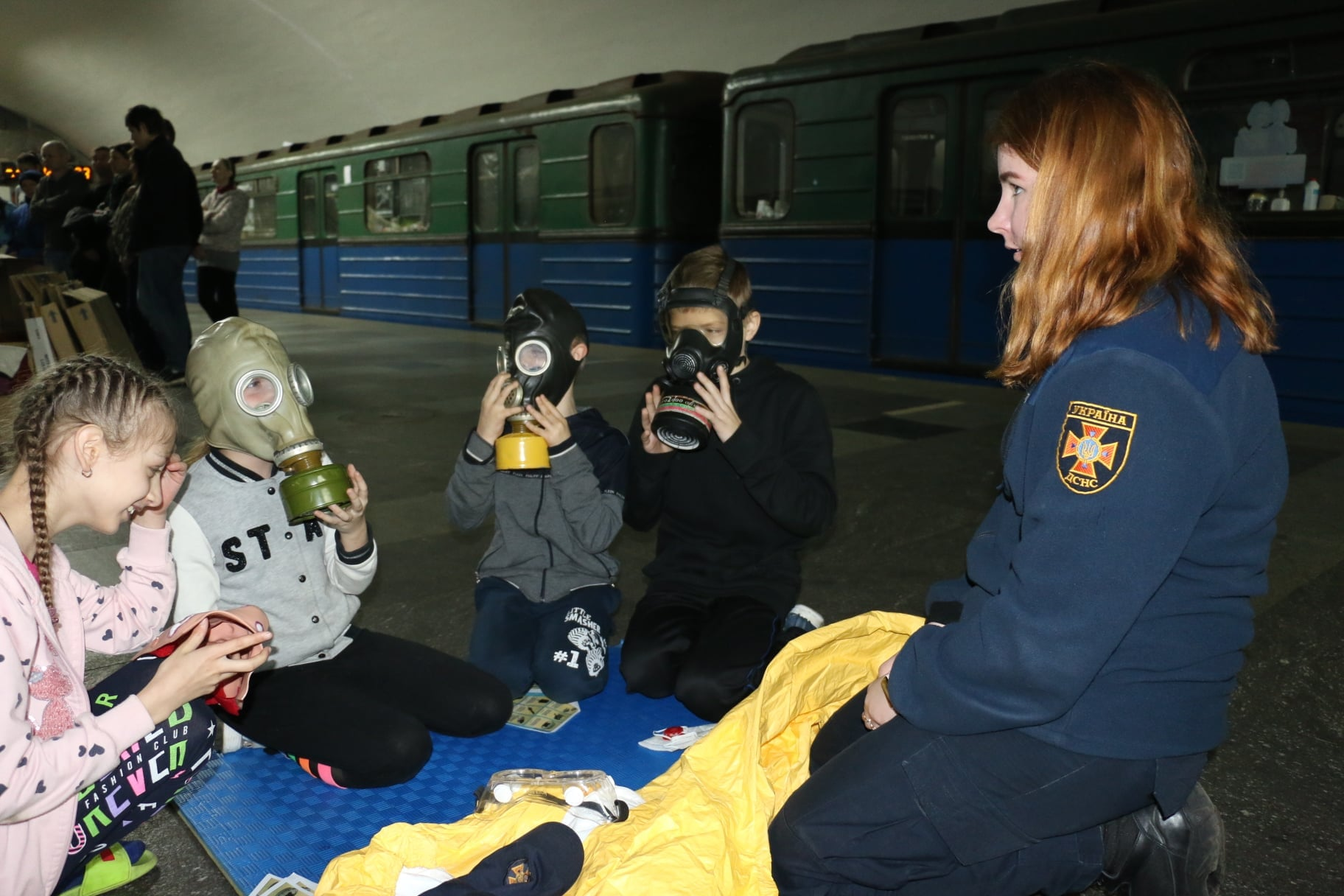
Employees of the State Emergency Service of Ukraine teach children hiding in the Kharkiv Metro about mine and chemical hazards, as well as how to provide emergency medical first aid.

During the Battle of Kharkiv of the 2022 Russian invasion of Ukraine, the metro was used as a bomb shelter. On 19 May 2022, Kharkiv mayor Ihor Terekhov announced that the metro would restart operations and that residents should move out of the metro system.

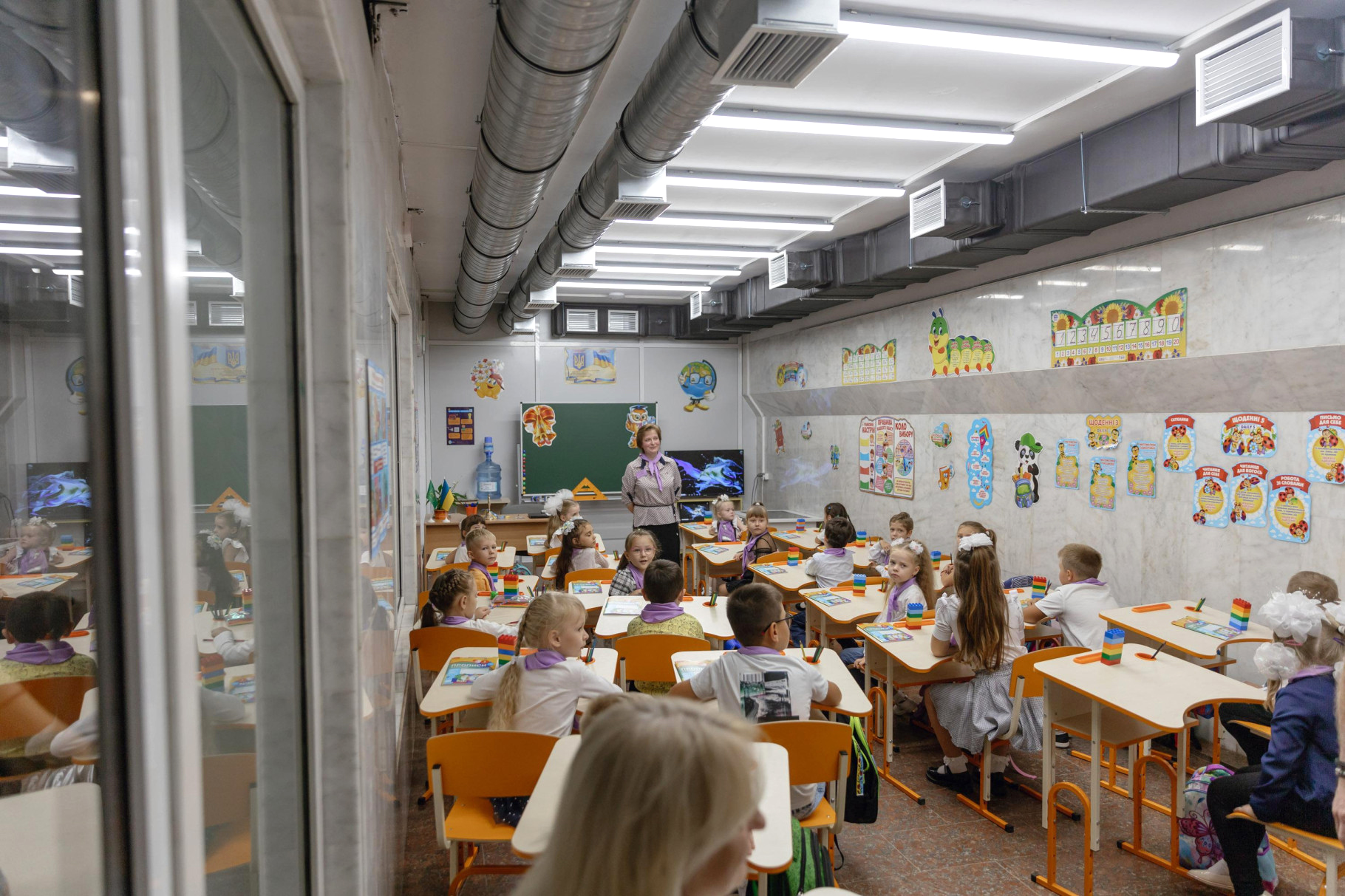
“Metro School” at a Kharkiv Metro station

Due to the shelling of Kharkiv, in September 2023 the local authorities decided to use part of the service premises of metro stations to ensure in-person education. For this purpose, the rooms were equipped with soundproofing as well as air recuperation and heating systems. As of April 2024, 2,200 primary, middle, and high school students were studying in the underground classrooms. On weekends, the premises are used to organize preparatory classes for preschool children.

Testing of the new metro train design began in April 2025. The train cars are planned to be updated to match the color scheme of Kharkiv’s public transport. The modernization includes redesigned interiors with improved seating, enhanced lighting, and digital information displays for passengers. Exterior livery will feature the city’s official colors, making the trains easily recognizable and reinforcing the metro’s visual identity.

==== Plans ====
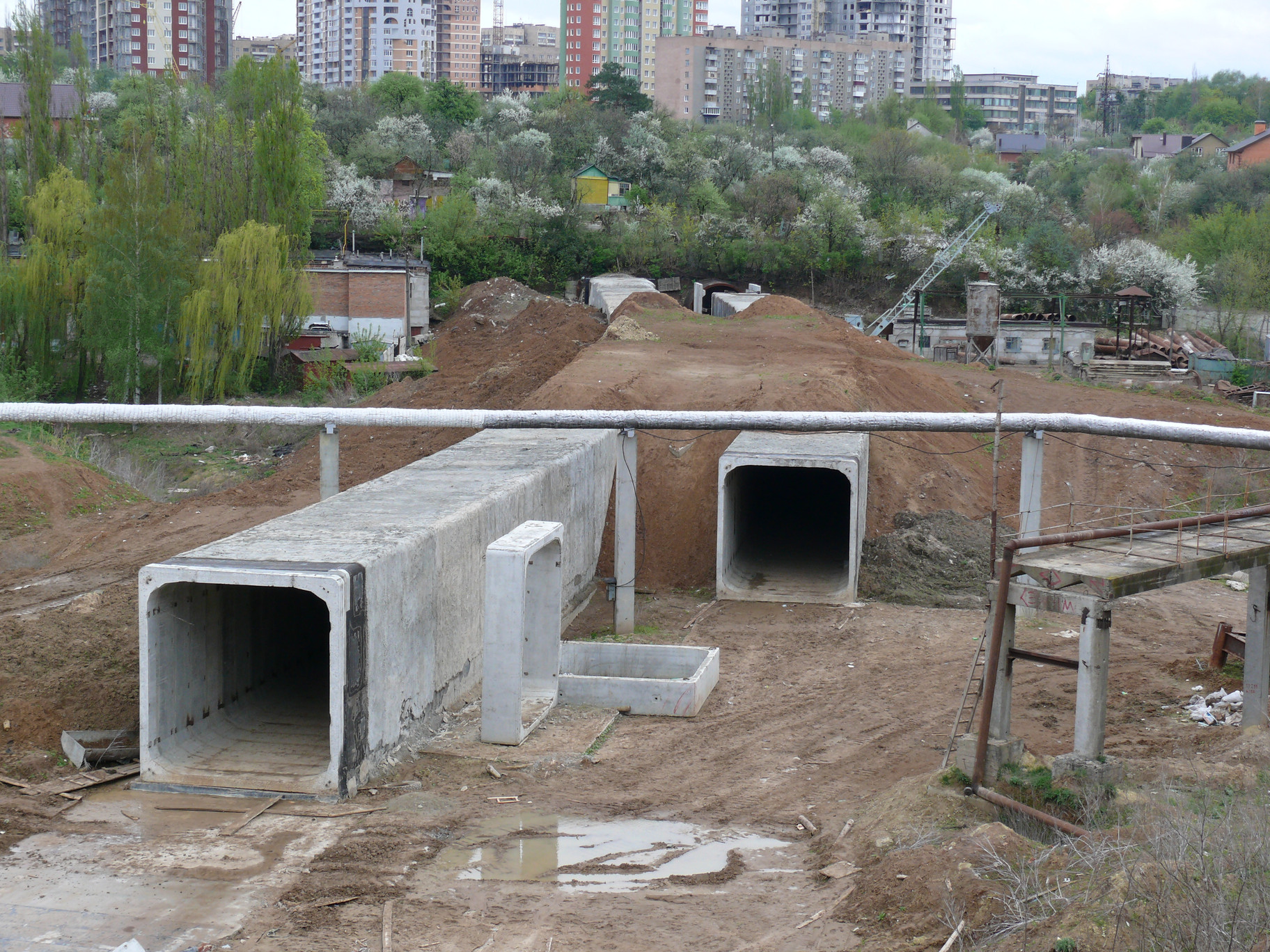
Open-cut construction of the Oleksiivska Metro Line between the 23 Serpnia and Oleksiivska stations

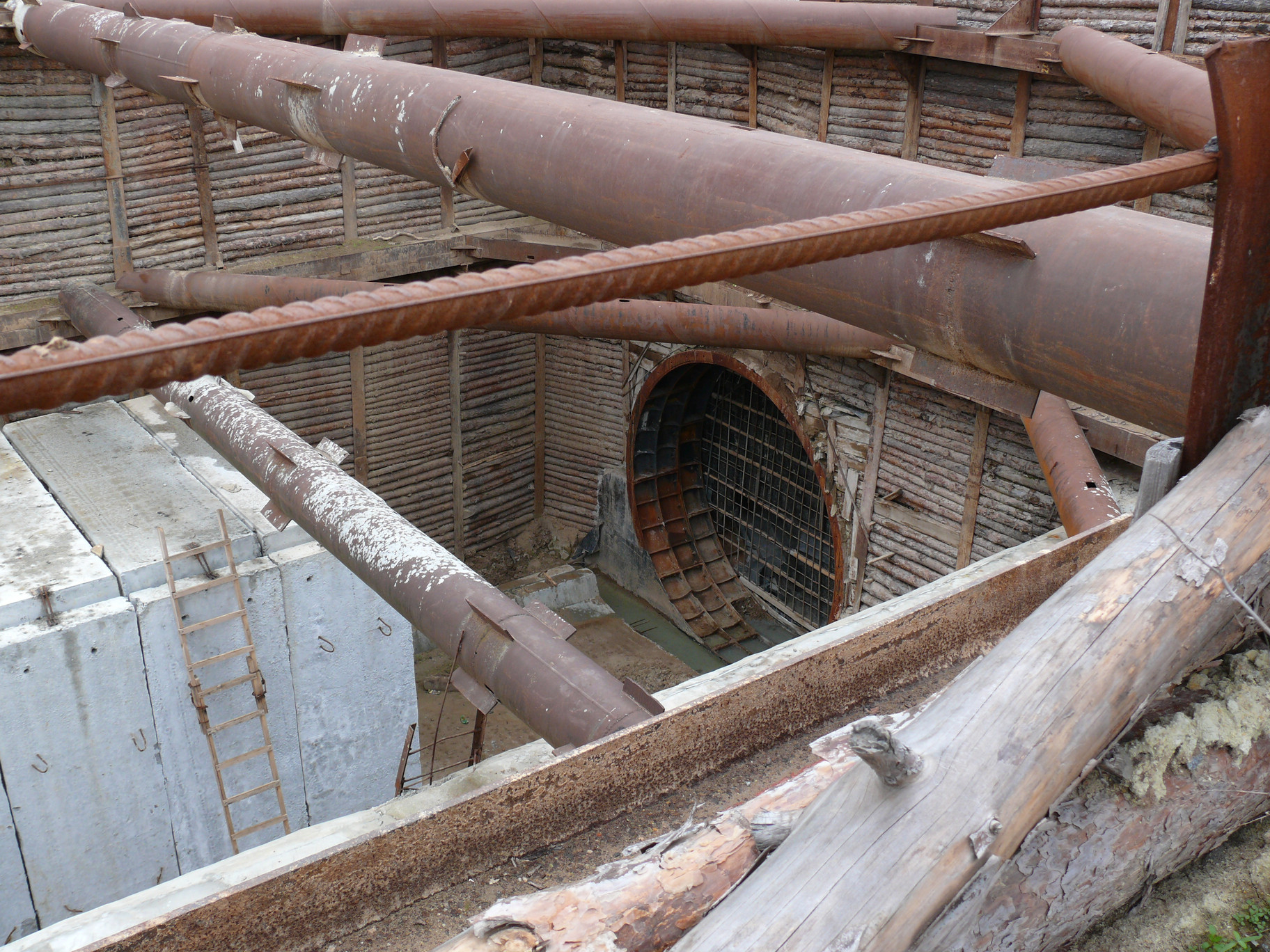
Construction of the Oleksiivska Line in the Oleksiivska Balka. View of the tunnel towards Oleksiivka.

By 2030, the Oleksiivske depot is planned to be commissioned, after which the Derzhavinska and Odeska stations are expected to open. Tunnel construction on this section will continue further south, where the future stations Motel Druzhba and Aeroport are planned.

An extension of the Saltivska Line is also planned: from Istorychnyi Muzei, it will be extended south to Ploshcha Urytskoho, where new turnaround tracks will be installed to improve line operation. Further south, the Novobavarska station is expected. In the northern part of the line, a new station, Druzhby Narodiv, will be built in connection with a future transfer to the Ring Line.

The Kholodnogirsko-Zavodska Line is also planned to be extended—toward Zalyutyno on one end and toward Skhidna, Rohanska, and Pivdenna on the other. The feasibility of constructing these stations will be assessed in the 2030s, with their opening expected during that decade based on the current pace of metro construction.

== Lines and stations ==
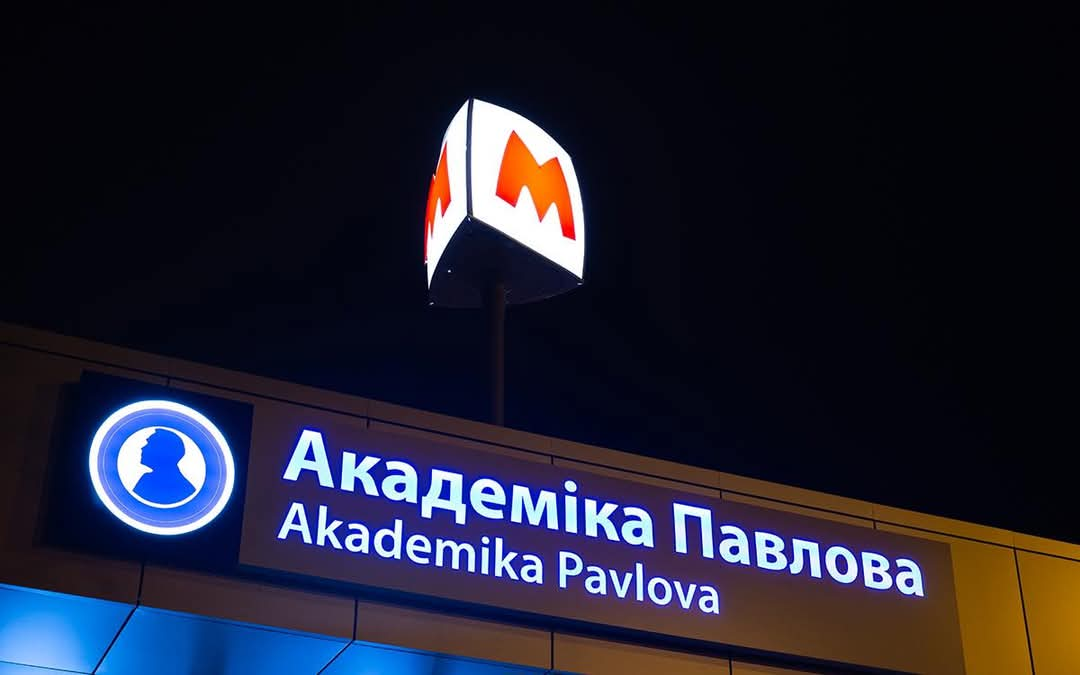
Entrance sign of Akademika Pavlova Station

Currently, there are three lines and 30 stations as follows:

No.	Name	Opened	Length	Stations	Average distance between stations
1	Kholodnohirsko-Zavodska Line	23 August 1975	17.39 km (10.81 mi)	13	1.449 km (0.900 mi)
2	Saltivska Line	11 August 1984	10.39 km (6.46 mi)	8	1.484 km (0.922 mi)
3	Oleksiivska Line	6 May 1995	10.98 km (6.82 mi)	9	1.3725 km (0.8528 mi)
TOTAL:			38.1 km (23.7 mi)	30	

Stations open at 5:30 am and close at 11:59 pm (the last train departs at around 12:10 am, depending on the line) without operations at nighttime except for special occasions, such as the New Year's Eve, the nightly Easter service and the like.

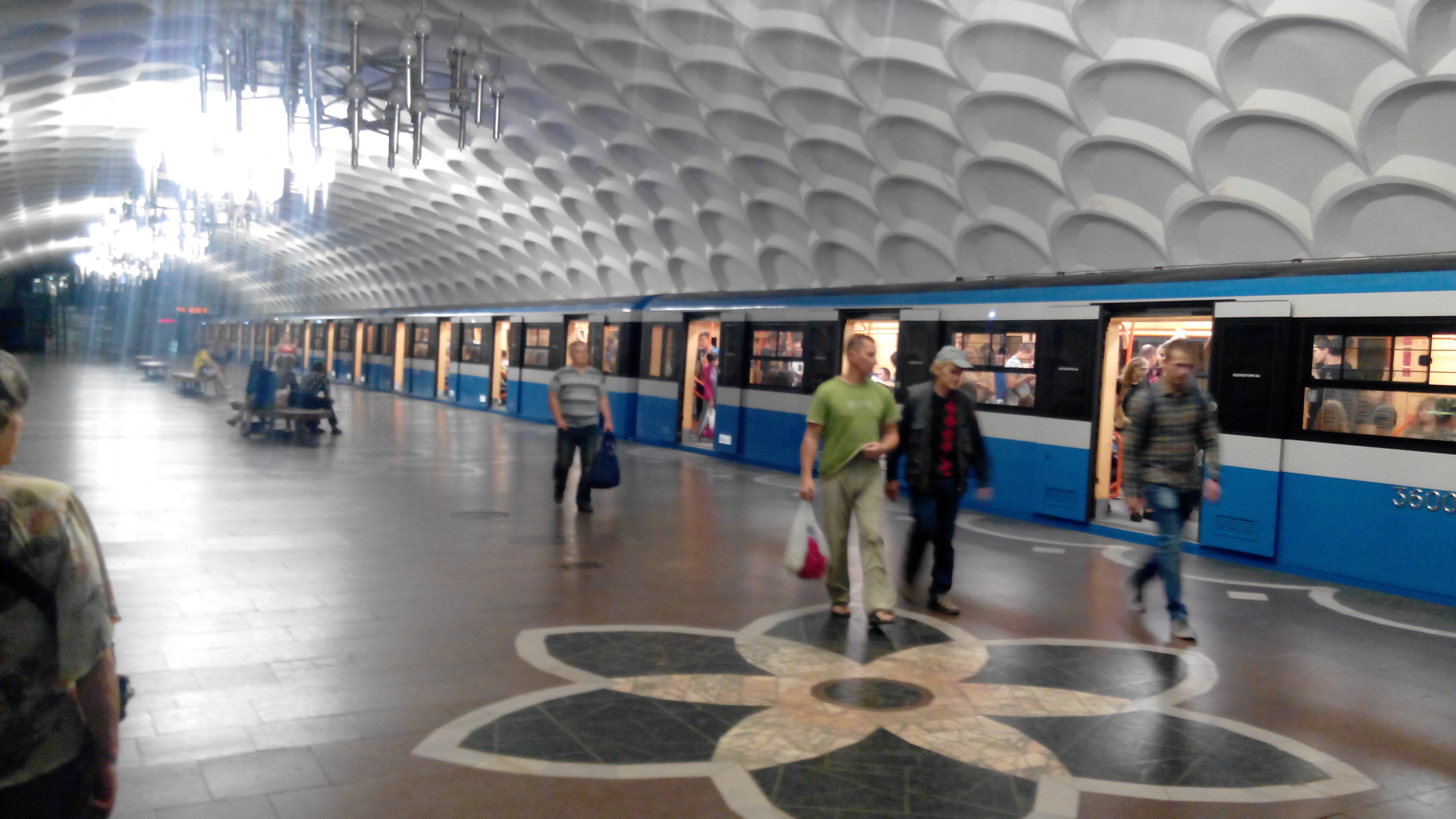
New 81-7036/7037 metro train at Kyivska Station

The lines are arranged in the form of a triangle with all interchange stations located in the city center and lines extending from there radially, a classic design for many ex-USSR metro systems. The whole of the system is located within the city boundaries without extending to Kharkiv Oblast, however, the new Oleksiivske Depot, which is currently under construction, will be located immediately behind the current municipal boundary.

Each line has two interchange stations connecting it to the other two lines, thus providing the possibility to change from any line to any other line with a single transfer. The Vokzalna station is integrated into the city's main railway station and provides access to all passenger platforms, cash offices and other facilities without the necessity to exit to the surface. Currently, boarding trains on the first track of the station is not possible from the underpass due to security controls at the train station entrance, except when an air raid alarm is active.

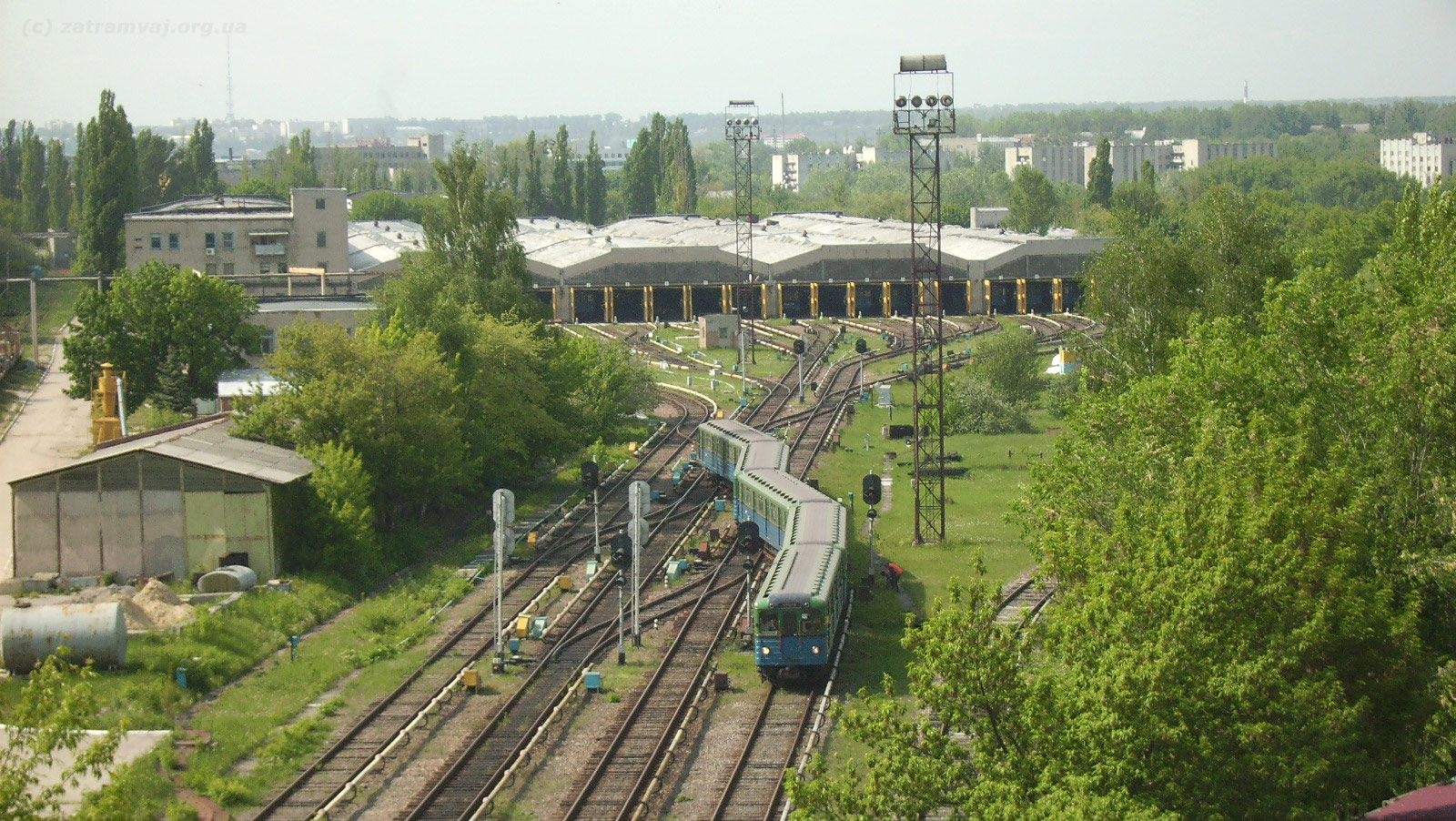
Electric depot "Nemyshlianske"

All stations have two tracks with an island platform between them. The stations and lines are located below the ground level except for tracks inside depots and a single metro bridge connecting stations Kyivska and Akademika Barabashova on the Saltivska line. The bridge, however, does not provide any view of the city as it is fully enclosed with non-transparent walls and a roof. The decision to make the metro fully enclosed was made primarily to protect it from heavy snowfalls that often occur in winter, a decision that proved to be right on many occasions, when the metro remained the only mode of passenger transportation functioning in the city.

=== Line 1 (Kholodnohirsko–Zavodska line) ===
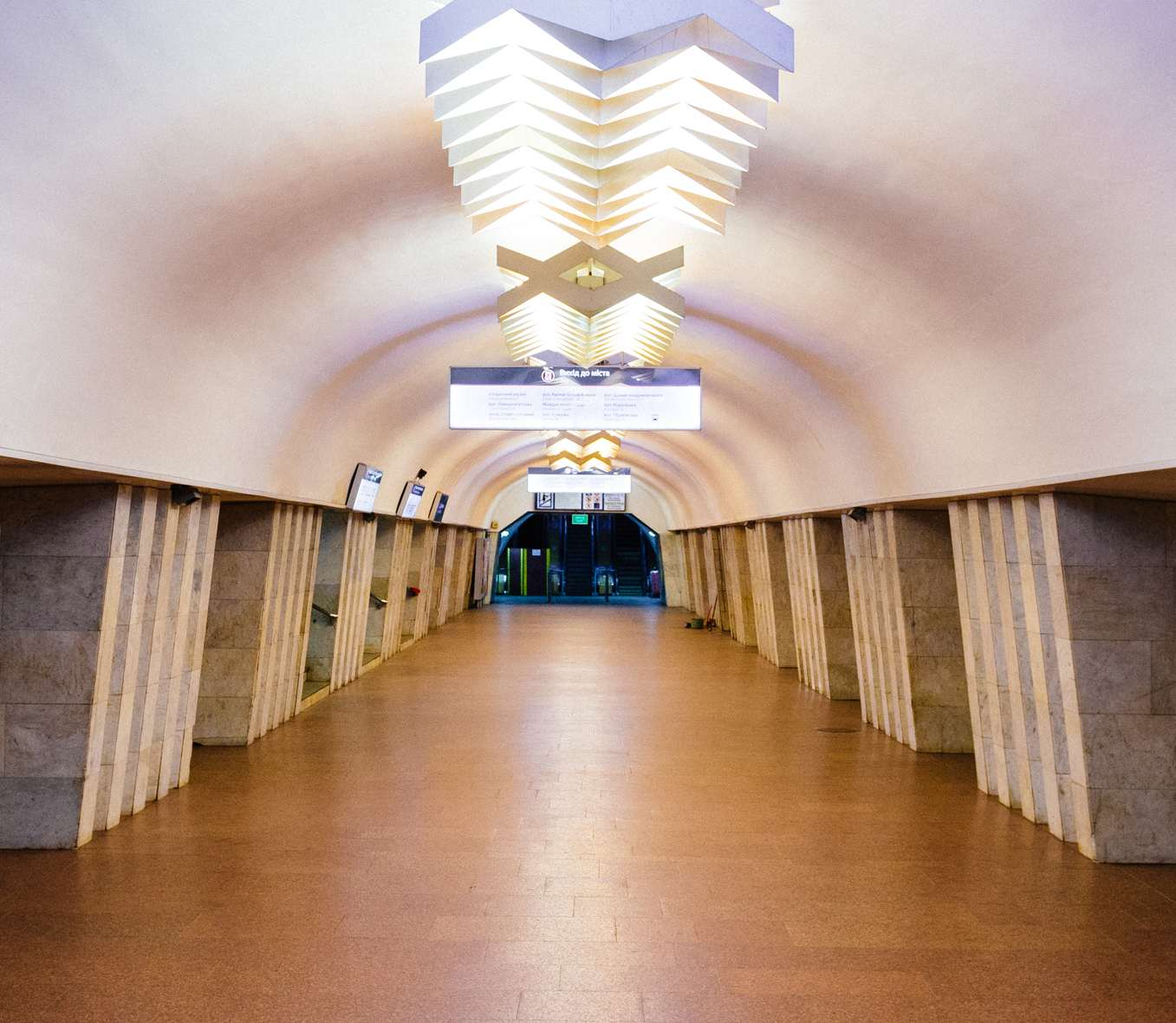
View of the station Maidan Konstytutsii

It is the oldest and the longest line in the Kharkiv Metro with the highest ridership rates and shortest time intervals. Its color is red.

The line was built along the so-called 'central axis' of the city roughly crossing it from East to West. The line serves Prospekt Heroiv Kharkova (in soviet times called Moskovskyi Prospekt), a street where some of the biggest enterprises in the former USSR were located (often called the 'alley of industrial giants'), as well as important transport hubs, the city's main stadium, etc. It replaced, partially or completely, the tram and trolleybus lines with the highest passenger ridership at the time of its construction. Although the ridership pattern has changed considerably since then, the line remains the most important route for passenger transportation in the city.

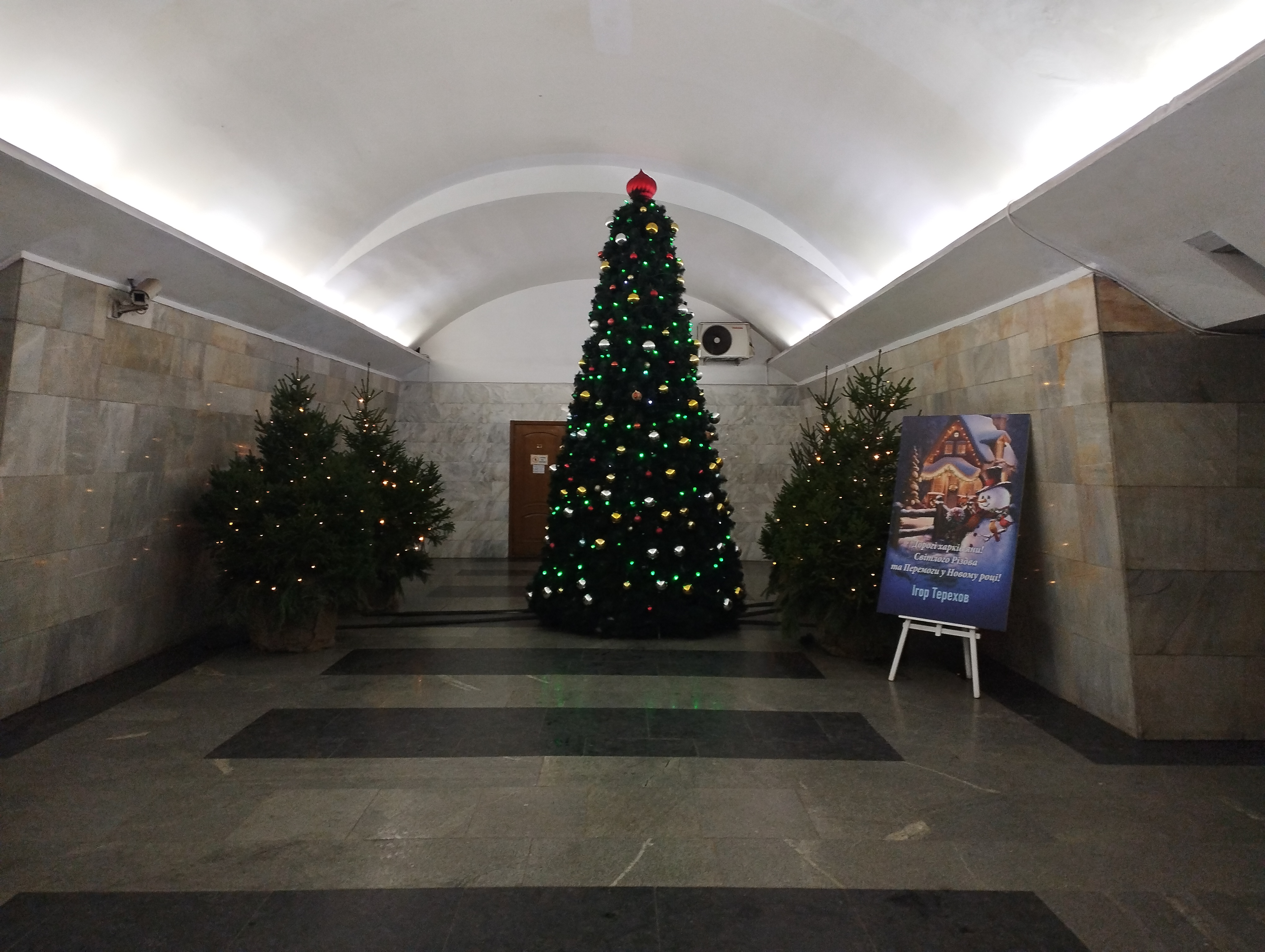
Vokzalna Station decorated for the New Year holidays

The Kholodnohirsko-Zavodska Line starts in the heavily industrialized area colloquially referred to as Kharkiv Tractor Plant, and follows along Prospekt Heroiv Kharkova for six stations (from Industrialna to Turboatom), connecting the city's largest enterprises and the residential areas located nearby. It continues through Zavodska, one more heavily industrialized area, and arrives at the Sportyvna station, where it is possible to change for the Metrobudivnykiv station of the Oleksiivska line. The station also provides access to the central stadium of Kharkiv, Metalist. After that, the line follows through Levada, a very important transport hub located near the city center, and runs through the 'old' (historical) center for two stations, Maidan Konstytutsii and Tsentralnyi Rynok. Then, it passes through two more large transport hubs, the city's main railway station at Vokzalna, and a large terminal for suburban buses at Kholodna Hora.

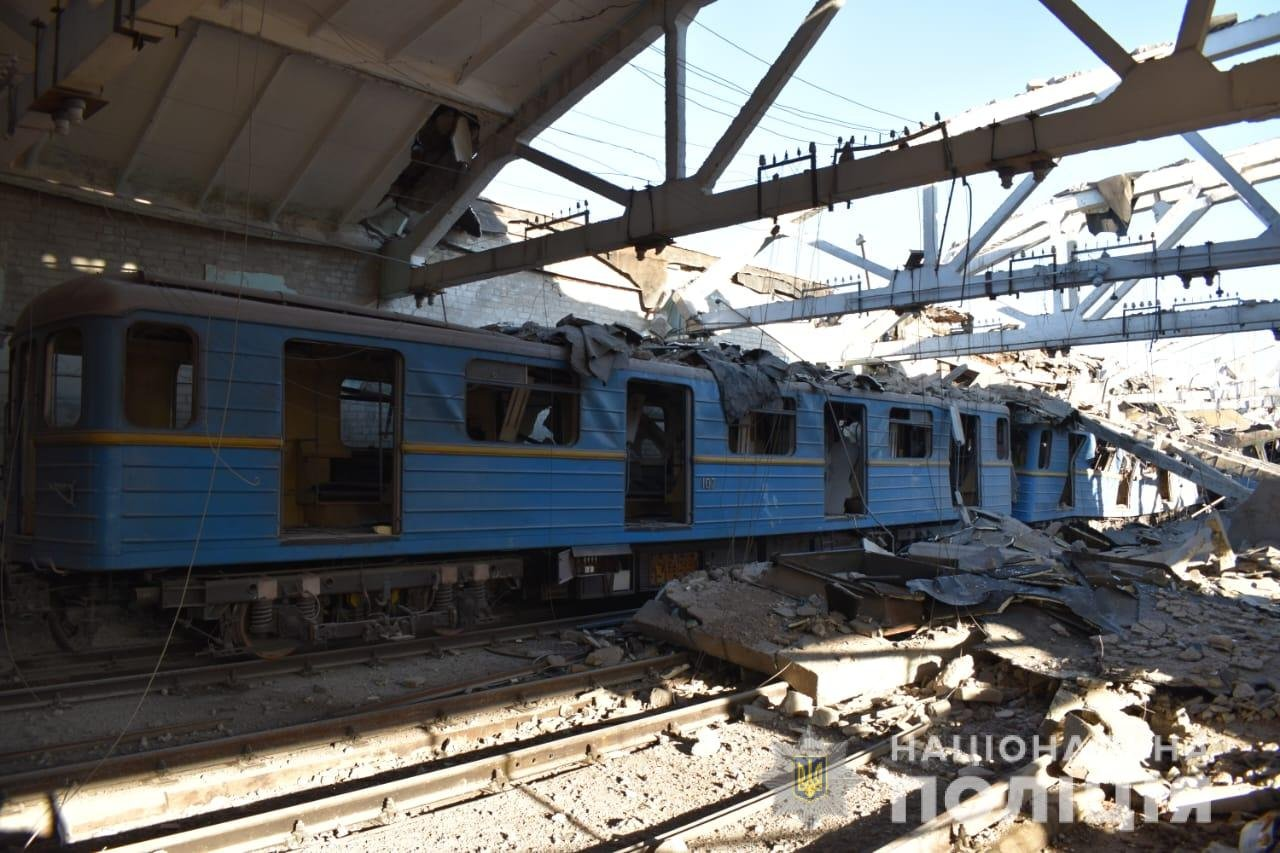
Consequences of a missile attack on the electric depot "Nemyshlianske" 20 June 2022.

Out of the 13 stations composing the line, three are laid deep (Maidan Konstytutsii, Vokzalna and Kholodna Hora); all the others are laid shallow. The line is served by the TCh-1 Nemyshlianske depot, with Kharkiv's oldest vehicles of types Ezh3 and Em-508T, a few trains composed of newer 81-717/714 vehicles and five recently modernized 81–710.1 trains.

The intervals are 1 1/2–2 minutes during rush hours, 3–5 minutes in-between, and extend up to 15 minutes after 9 pm. During the summer vacation season (June–August), intervals can be longer.

All trains operate the whole length of the line, from Industrialna to Kholodna Hora, except for short trips from Kholodna Hora to Turboatom and from Turboatom to Industrialna. Such trips are usually made around 2–3 p.m. and late in the evening to replace trains on the line or withdraw them to the depot for the night service period, as access is available only through the Turboatom station.

=== Line 2 (Saltivska line) ===
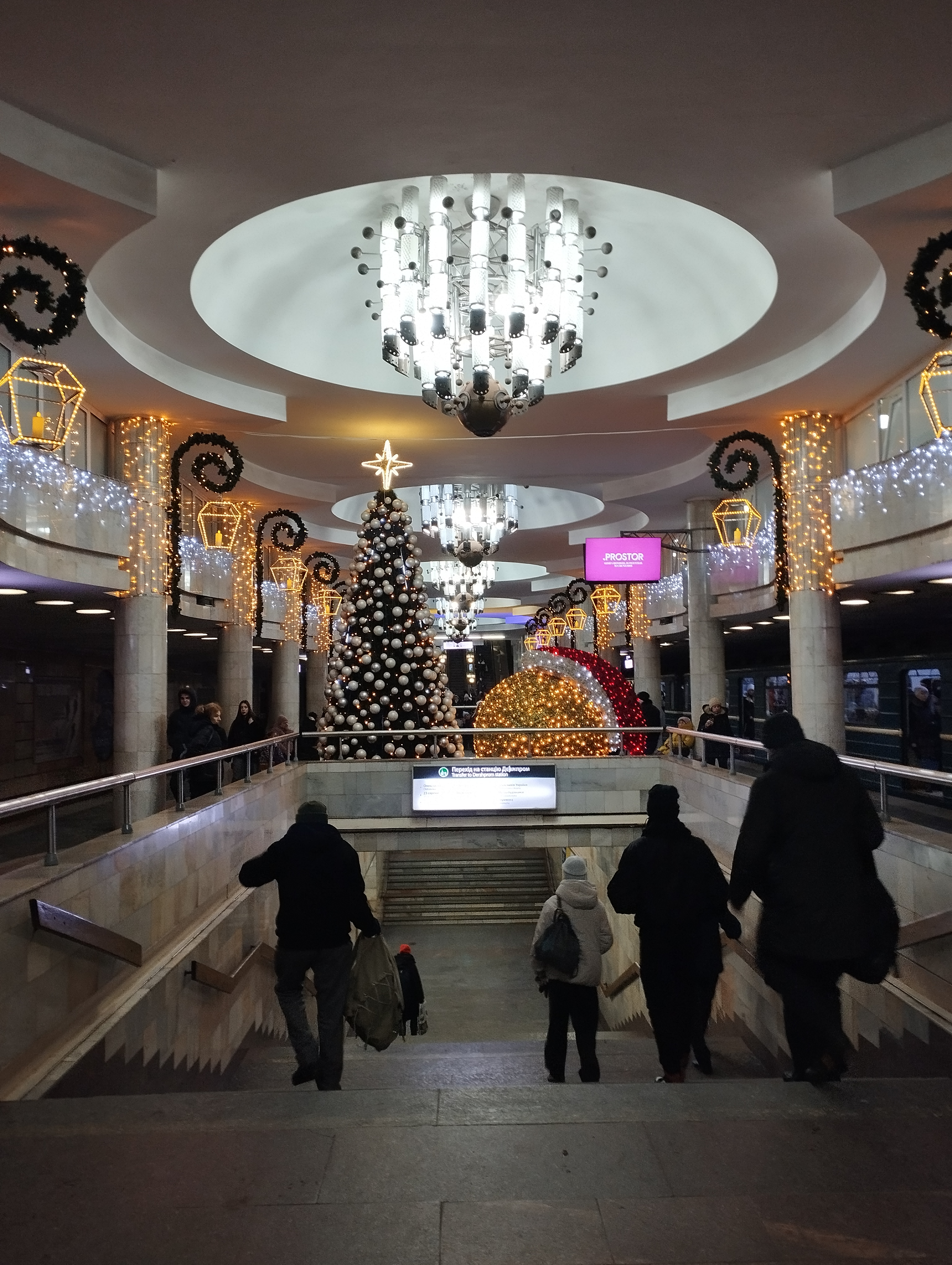
Universytet Station decorated for the New Year holidays

The Saltivska Line is historically the second line of the Kharkiv Metro. Although the Oleksiivska Line has surpassed it in terms of line length, Saltivska Line remains second in terms of ridership rates and service frequency. Its color is blue.

The line cuts Kharkiv roughly along the northeast-southwest axis starting in the city center and ends in the Saltivka neighborhood in the North-East. The first plans for constructing the line appeared in the mid-1970s when the city started developing high-rise residential housing on the Saltivske Plateau, a large and flat area near the northeast boundaries of the city. The area was to become the largest residential neighborhood in Europe at the time of its construction. However, it was supposed to be located far from the main points of passenger attraction, such as industrial areas, transport hubs, leisure facilities and the like. Thus, the need for a strong link between the neighborhood and other parts of the city became evident.

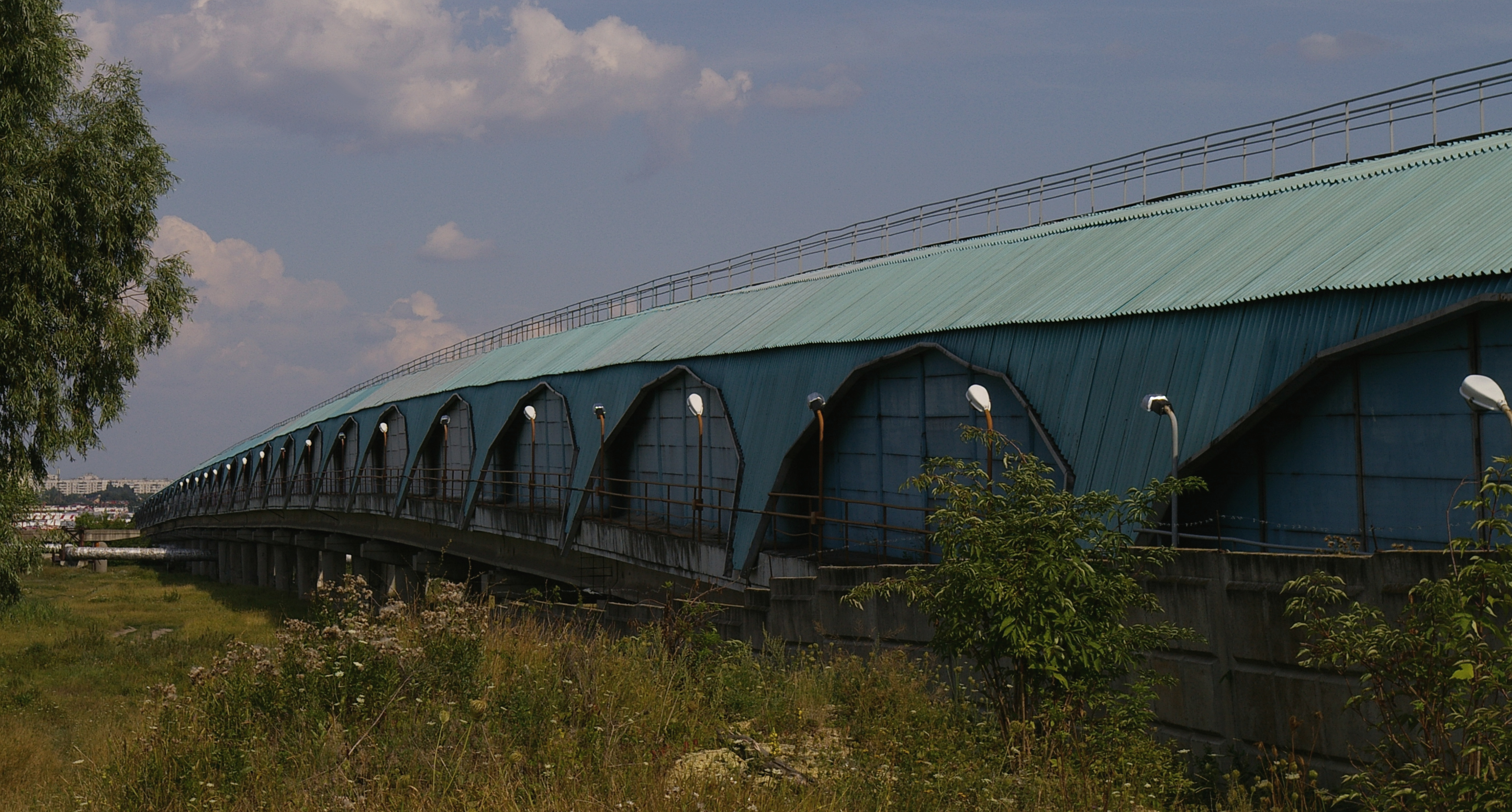
Kharkiv Metro Bridge

The construction of the line was performed simultaneously with the development of Saltivka, which helped cut the cost of construction considerably. The section from Akademika Barabashova to Saltivska was constructed using the cut-and-cover method for tunnels, which is the cheapest one. The stations located on the line are acclaimed for their concise, yet unique and attractive design. The line also features the Kharkiv Metro's only metro bridge.

Initially, it was planned to fork the line at Akademika Barabashova so that there would be two branches, one of them passing Saltivka from south to north (which is currently in operation) and the other one passing the neighborhood from west to east. According to initial plans, half of the trains arriving from the city center would then follow the south-north branch and the other half would follow the west-east one, alternating in sequence. The west-east branch was never constructed due to financial difficulties and is currently substituted by route 24 of the Kharkiv Trolleybus.

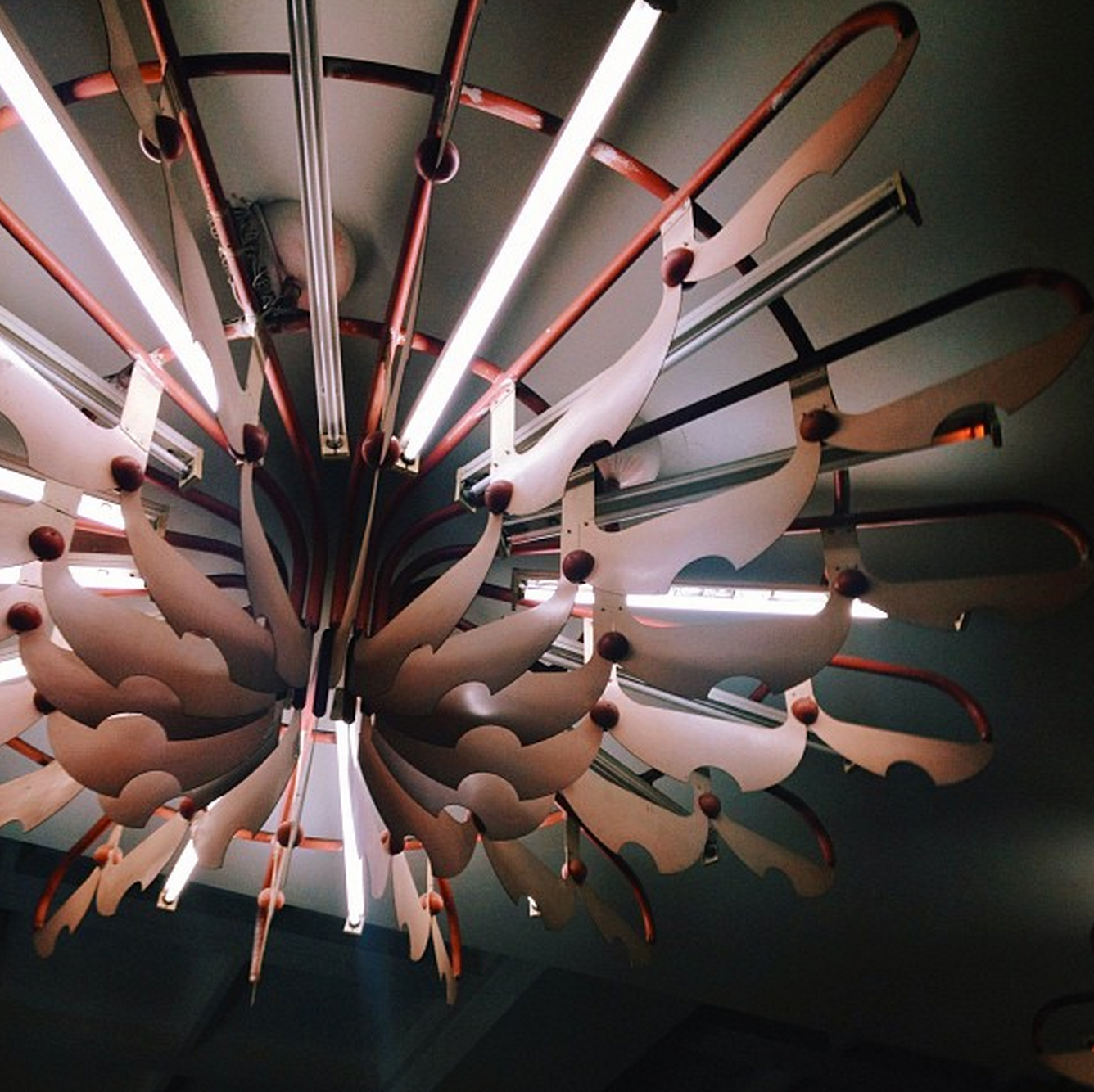
An art deco light fixture from Arkhitektora Beketova station

The Saltivska Line starts in the "old" (historical) center of the city at the Istorychnyi Muzei station, which also provides a transfer to Maidan Konstytutsii on the Kholodnohirsko-Zavodska Line. After leaving the station, the line follows a long and steep ascend to the Universytet station located in the heart of the "new" (business) center, under one of the largest squares in Europe, Svobody Square. It provides a transfer to the Derzhprom station on the Oleksiivska Line. Then, the line passes one more station in the city center, Yaroslava Mudroho, and performs a steep dive into the city's lowest part, Zhuravlivka. After a short visit to Zhuravlivka at Kyivska, the line crosses the Kharkiv River via the metro bridge and enters the Saltivka neighborhood. The rest of the stations, from Akademika Barabashova to Saltivska are located within the neighborhood, laid approximately at the same (shallow) depth.

The line is characterized by a severe increase in ridership during rush hours and the strong influence of Barabashovo Market, which claims to be the largest market in Europe (located near Akademika Barabashova station, which gave the market its name). The market operates from roughly 8 a.m. to 3 p.m., increasing the passenger traffic considerably during the morning rush hours, especially on Wednesday, traditionally the discounts day. The traffic on the line also has a distinct student ridership pattern: most of Kharkiv's higher educational establishments are located around the Istorychnyi Muzei, Universytet, and Yaroslava Mudroho stations, but the respective student dormitories are located near the Studentska station. Saltivska is an important transport hub providing connections to the city's most important tram routes and serving a bus station for suburban routes.

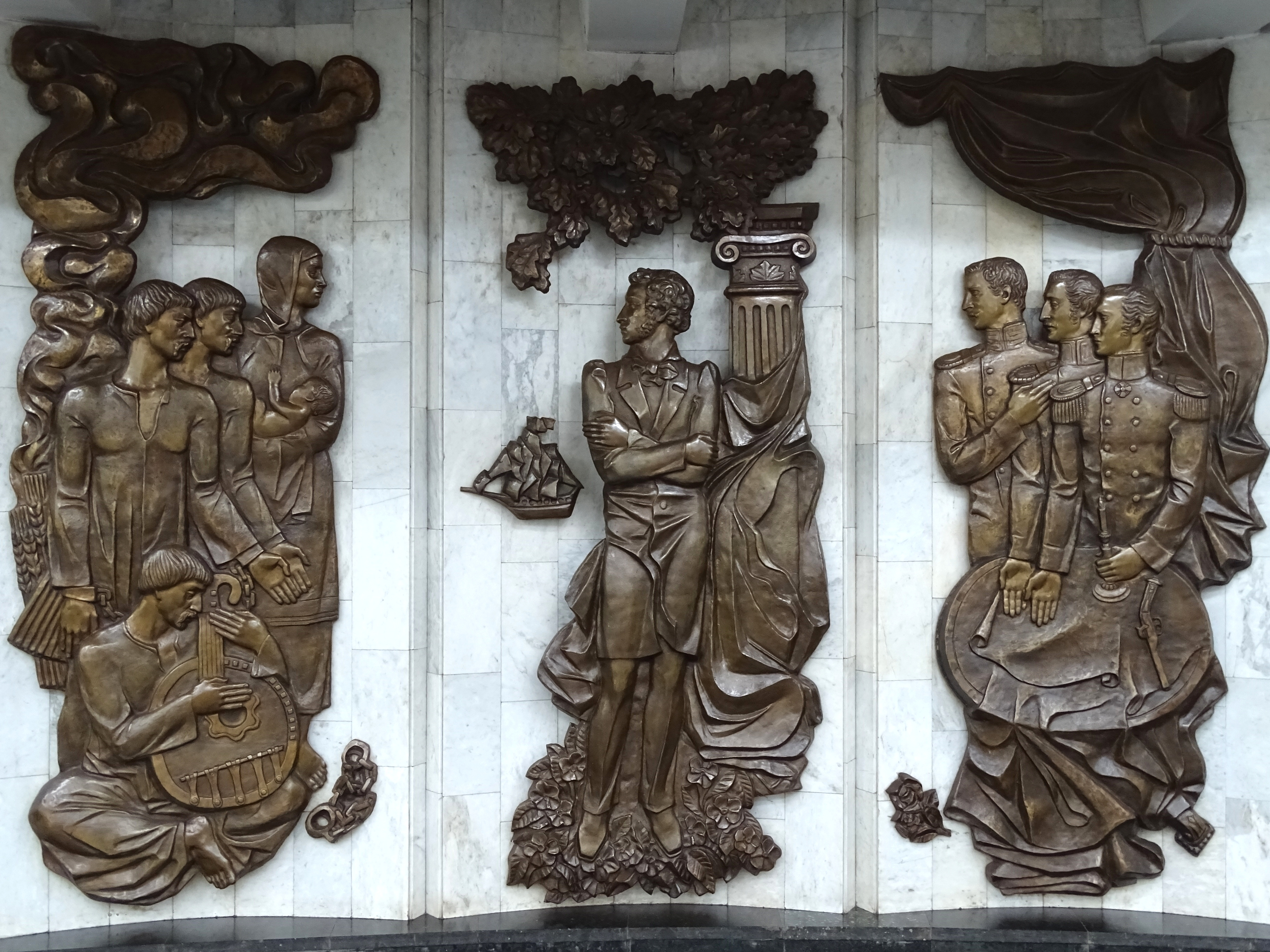
Bas-relief of five figures in front of the escalator leading to Yaroslava Mudroho Station

Out of the eight stations on the line, three are laid deep (Istorychnyi Muzei, Universytet, and Yaroslava Mudroho); all the others are laid shallow. Yaroslava Mudroho is the deepest station in the system at 30 meters (98 ft) underground. The line is served by depot TCh-2 Saltivske with Soviet-era 81-717/714 trains and a single domestically produced 81-7036/7037 trainset. Access to the depot is provided via the Akademika Barabashova station.

The intervals are 3–5 minutes during rush hours, 5–6 minutes in-between, and extend up to 20 minutes after 9 pm. During the summer vacation season (June–August), intervals can be longer.

All trains operate the whole length of the line, from Istorychnyi Muzei to Saltivska. Starting from 2001, because of power supply issues, every fourth train that operated on the line between rush hours served only the Istorychnyi Muzei – Akademika Barabashova segment. The practice was abandoned by the end of 2002 when the power supply normalized.

=== Line 3 (Oleksiivska line) ===
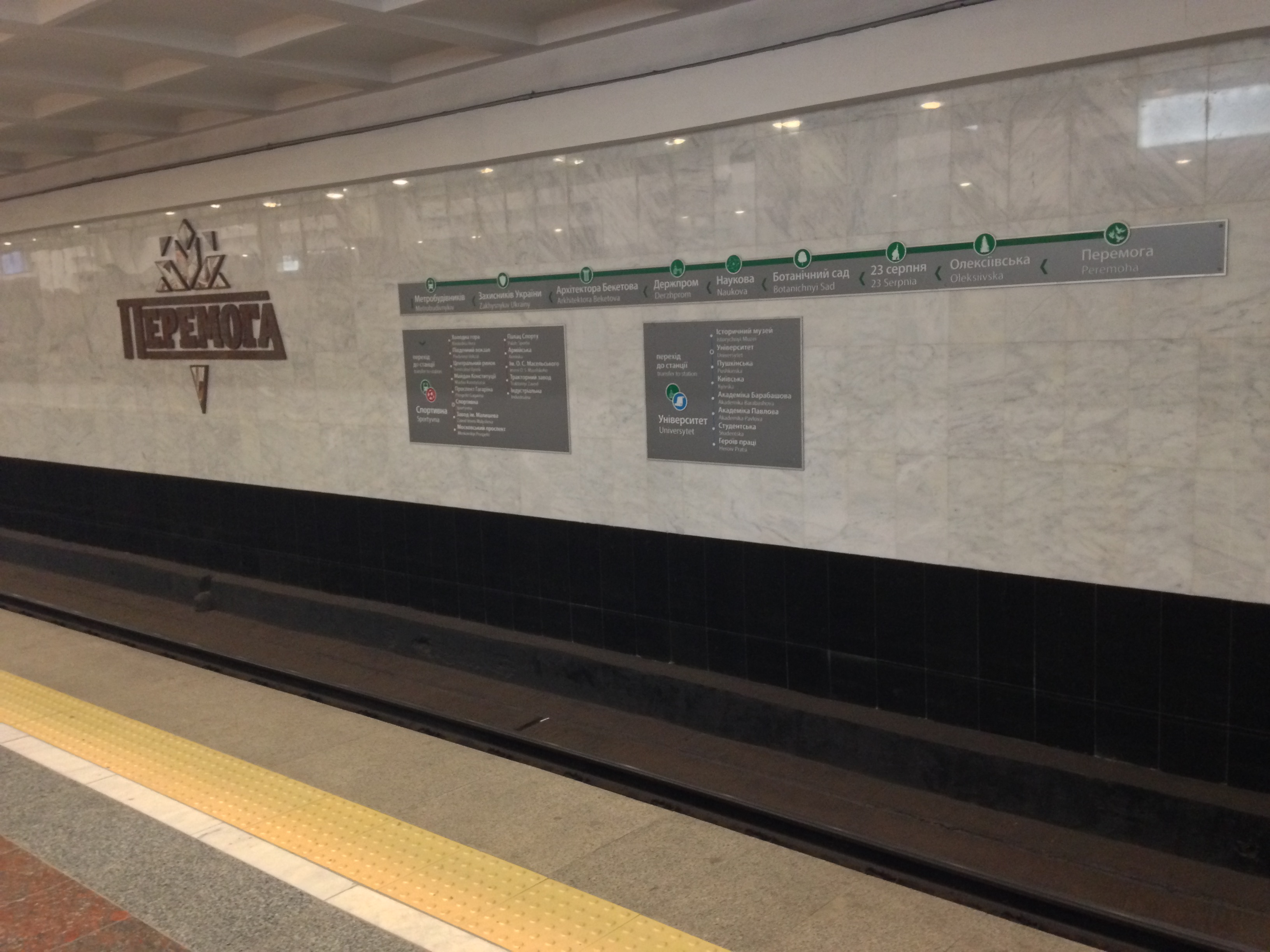
Peremoha station, opened in 2016.

The Oleksiivska Line is the newest, third line of the Kharkiv Metro. After the construction of the "Oleksiivske" depot, it will have access to the Kharkiv Oblast.

The Oleksiivska Line was opened on 6 May 1995, initially consisting of five stations on the section from Metrobudivnykiv to Naukova.

On 21 August 2004, two more stations were opened — 23 Serpnia and Botanichnyi Sad.

On 21 December 2010, the Oleksiivska station was opened, and on 19 August 2016, the Peremoha station was inaugurated. Further extensions of the line are planned; in particular, the State Budget of Ukraine for 2019 allocated UAH 30 million for continuing its construction.

Starting in 2026, the Kharkiv City Council, for the first time since the beginning of Russian invasion of Ukraine in 2022, allocated funds for the construction of the Derzhavynska and Odeska metro stations.

=== Saltivsko-Zavodska Line ===
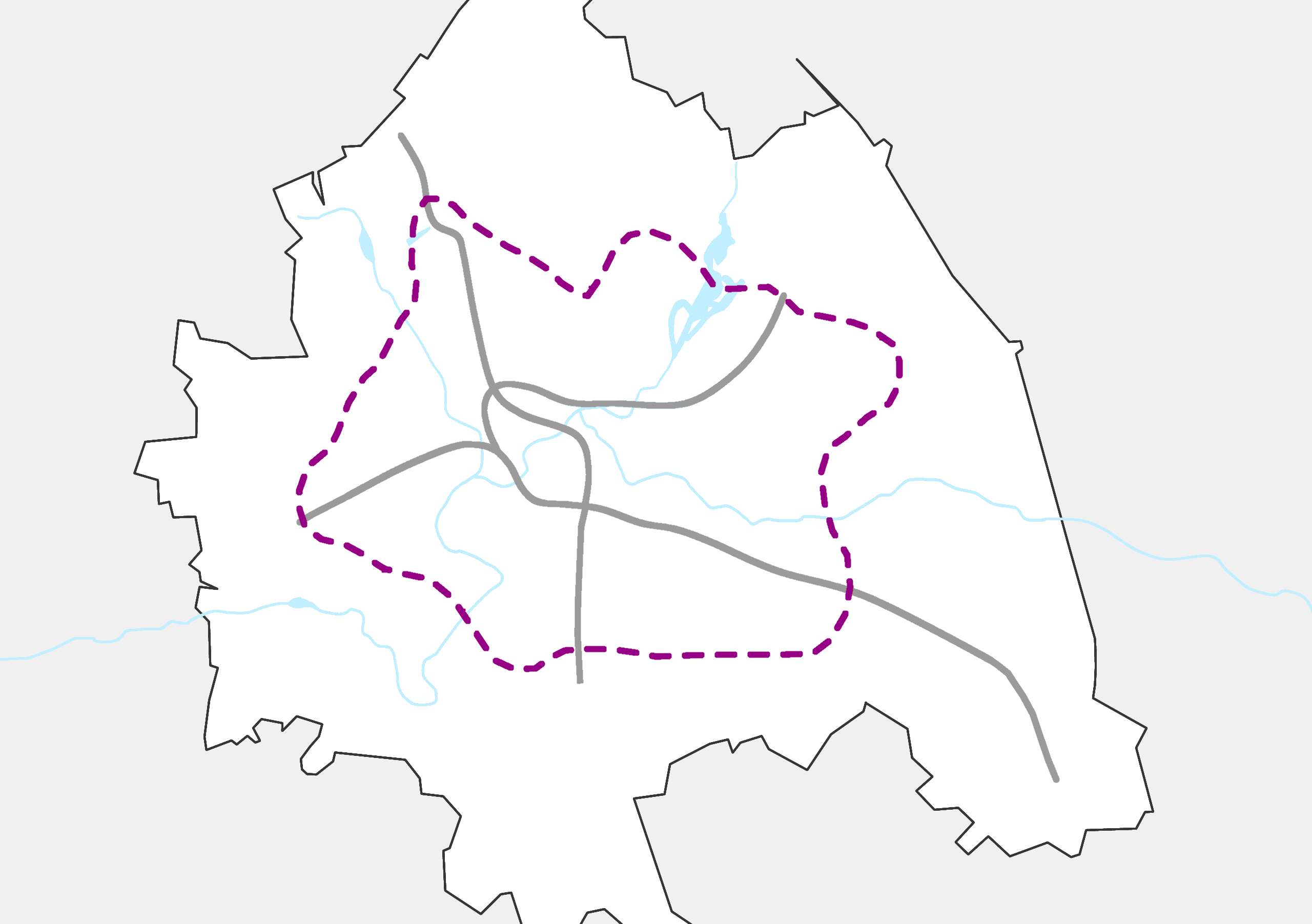
Development prospects of the Saltivsko-Zavodska (Ring) Line

The Saltivsko-Zavodska Line is the fourth (prospective) line of the Kharkiv Metro and is also considered the first phase of the “Ring Line.” It is shown on current official maps. The alignment of the line in the Skhidna Saltivka area envisages surface sections at the point where it crosses the Nemyshlia River.

At the design stage (draft Order of the Cabinet of Ministers of Ukraine “On Approval of the Concept of the Program for the Construction and Development of Metro Networks for 2011–2020”), the fourth line was envisaged to connect the densely populated districts of the Saltivskyi residential area and extend into the industrial zone, partially duplicating existing tram route No. 26.

The first phase of construction provides for the opening of two interchange stations: Heroiv Pratsi-2 (transfer to the Saltivska Line) and Imeni O. S. Maselskoho-2 (transfer to the Kholodnogirsko-Zavodska Line), as well as several stations along the route.

As the issue has not been finally resolved, the list of planned stations may vary across different sources.

Initially, it was planned to construct a branch from the Akademika Barabashova station of the Saltivska Line along Yuvileinyi Avenue, with the construction of the Hvardiitsiv Shyronintsiv, Prospekt Traktorobudivnykiv, and Skhidna Saltivka stations.

However, according to the new Master Plan for the development of Kharkiv, the construction of a full-fledged metro line is envisaged through the 602nd microdistrict, from the Saltivska station of the Saltivska Line to the Imeni O. S. Maselskoho station of the Kholodnogirsko-Zavodska Line. The project was developed by the “Kharkivmetroproekt” institute.

On 15 February 2011, the Kharkiv City Council's department announced plans for the construction of the Metro Circle Line.

== Facts and numbers ==
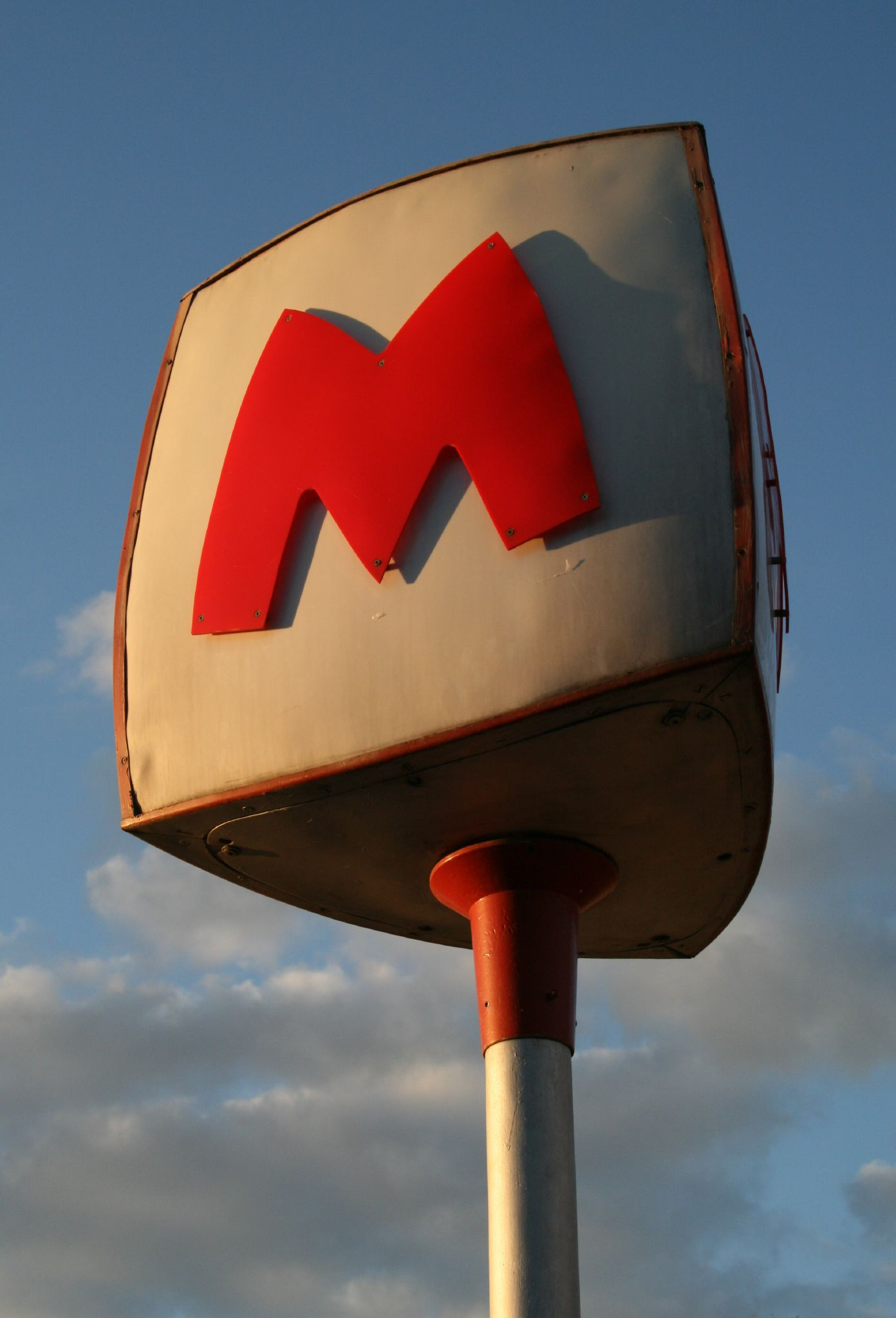
Kharkiv metro sign

On Easter night from 19 to 20 April 2009 (from 00:30 to 02:00), a concert of the academic symphony orchestra of the Kharkiv Philharmonic Society under the direction of conductor Yuri Yanko took place on the platform of the Universytet station. The concert attracted about 5,000 listeners. There were subway trains on both sides of the platform during the concert for the safety of spectators. When the concert ended, the two trains took the audience in different directions.

At the beginning of August 2009, in the lobby of the Universytet station, on the 34th anniversary of the completion of its construction, a monument to the metro builder was unveiled, immediately nicknamed the "Tin Woodman". The monument represents a post-constructivist "worker" made from scraps of metal and springs, pierced by a rail, wearing an orange construction helmet. According to the then director of the metro, Sergey Museev, the sculpture "symbolizes the hard work of metro residents who have been working underground for years". According to passengers, this character "only scares children". On 3 February 2010, the monument was moved to the metro control building.

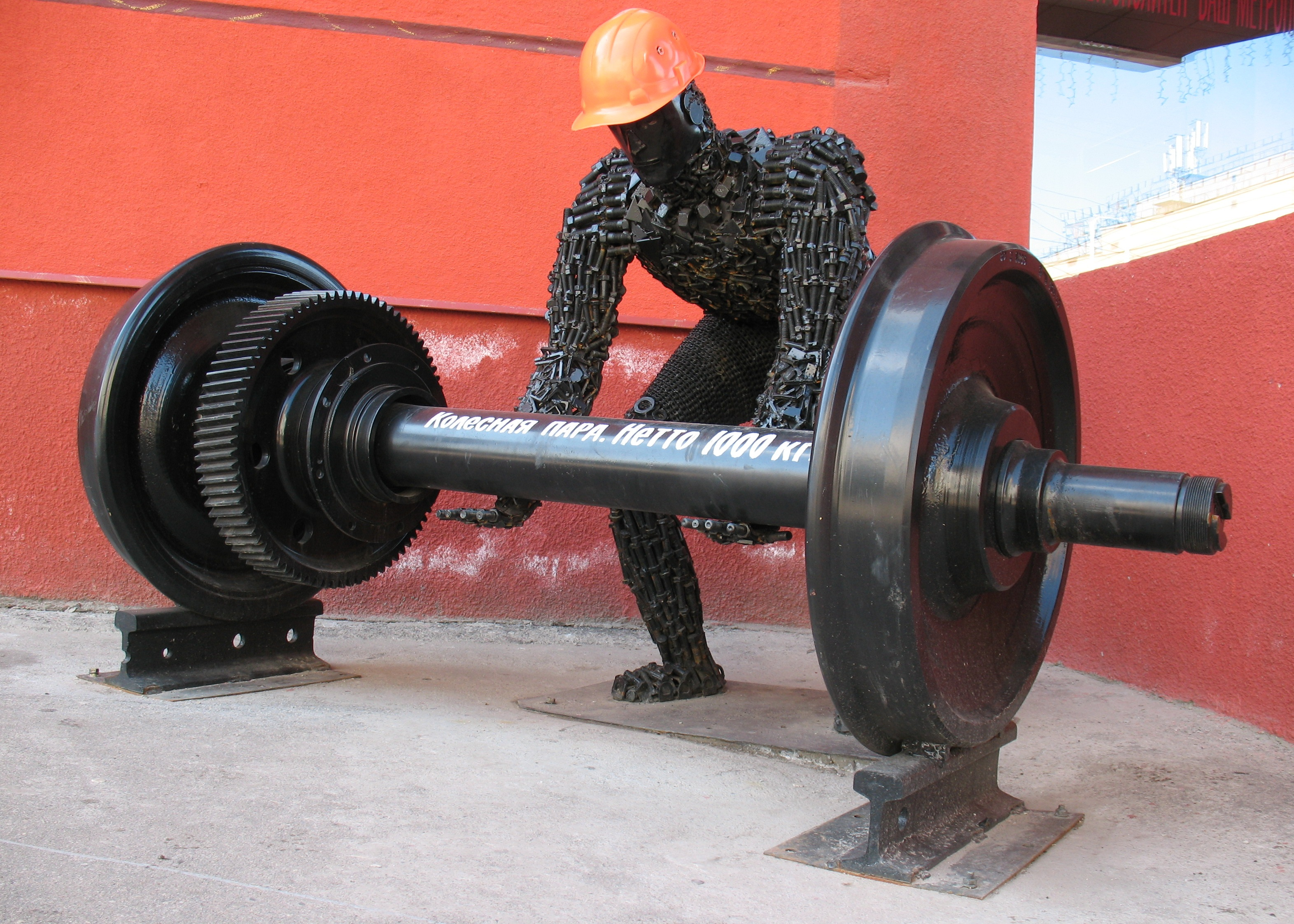
Monument to metro workers

As for 2020, the Kharkiv Metro had daily passenger traffic of 350,000 passengers.

2300 employees work in the metro.

Because of the city's uneven landscape, the metro stations are located at varying depths. Six of the system's 30 stations are deep-level stations, and the remaining are shallow. Of the former, all but one are pylon type, and the latter are column type. The shallow stations are fourteen pillar-trispans and eight single vaults. Kharkiv was the first metro to exhibit the single vault design of the shallow type (for technical details, see Skhodnenskaya).

The metro is served by two depots which have a total of 320 carriages forming 59 five-car trainsets (all of the platforms are exactly 100 metres (330 ft) long). In 2015, new trains were introduced to the metro.

The metro was directly subordinated to the Ministry of Transport of Ukraine. Unlike the Kyiv Metro, Kharkiv is not privatized and is owned by a municipal company. In 2009, the Ministry transferred the metro to the city administration.

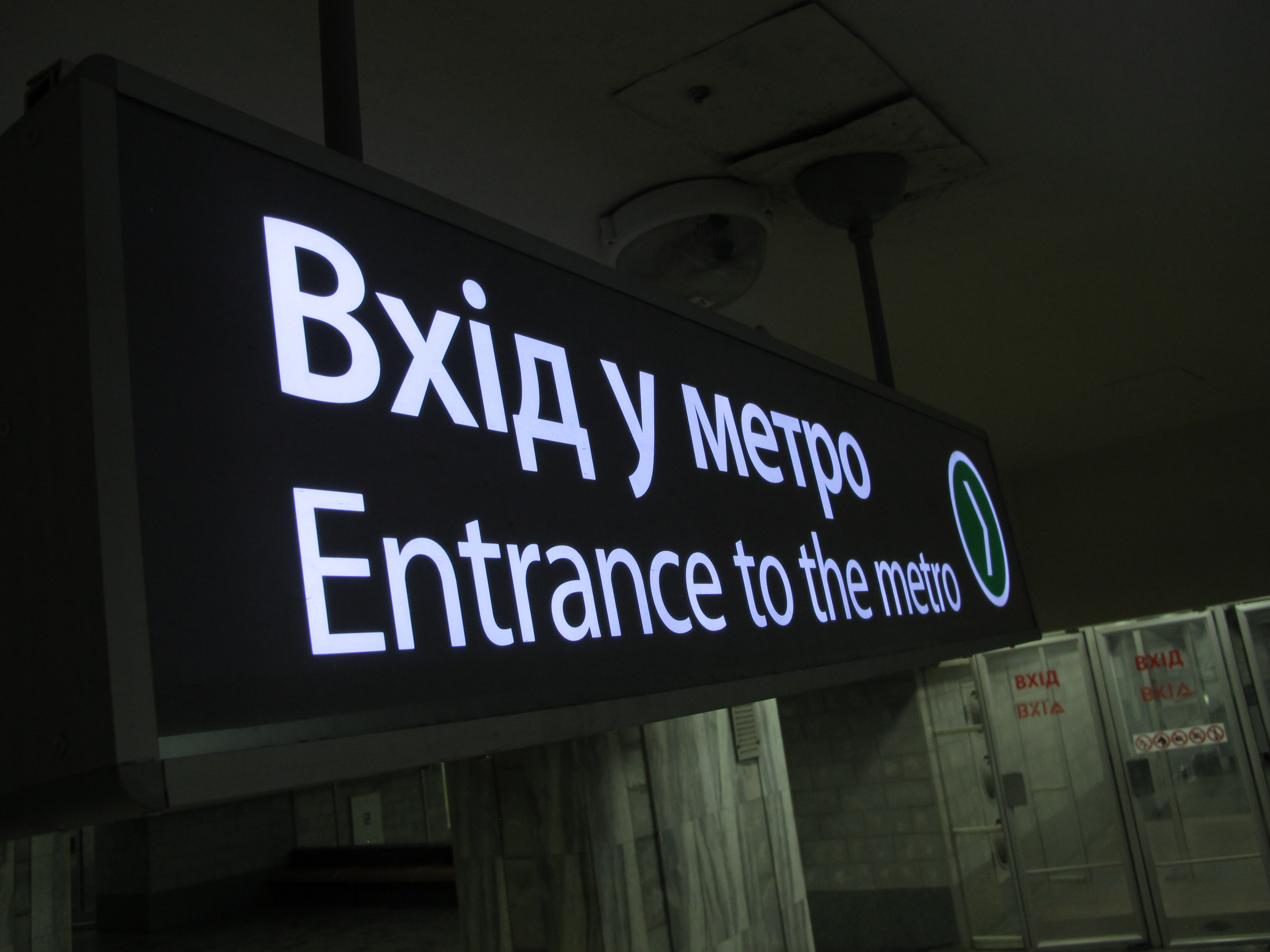
Metro entrance sign in Ukrainian and English

Station Peremoha — the Post-Soviet Record Holder for Longest Construction. The construction site for the station began in 1984, but the station was opened only in 2016 — 32 years after the start of work, making it the longest-delayed metro station project in the Post-Soviet states.

In July 2012, Kharkiv Metro was recognized as the Best Enterprise of Ukraine for 2012.

In 2026, Kharkiv Metro set a world record by hosting the largest ensemble of panels in the world made using the technique of hot enamel on copper.

=== Signs and announcements ===
Information system of the Kharkiv Metro since 2016.

Voice announcement for the final station (Industrialna) on the Kholodnohirsko-Zavodska line

Initially, station announcements were made only in Russian, the official language of the USSR, while all signs on the stations of the first line were in Ukrainian (partially Russified in the second half of the 1980s). By 1997, Ukrainian had been fully restored in station names and information boards, and during preparations for Euro 2012, they were also duplicated in Latin script.

In 1987, the metro switched to bilingual announcements, and since 1993, announcements have been made exclusively in Ukrainian.

In 2012, during UEFA Euro 2012, announcements were made in Ukrainian and English. After the conclusion of Euro 2012, English-language announcements were discontinued.

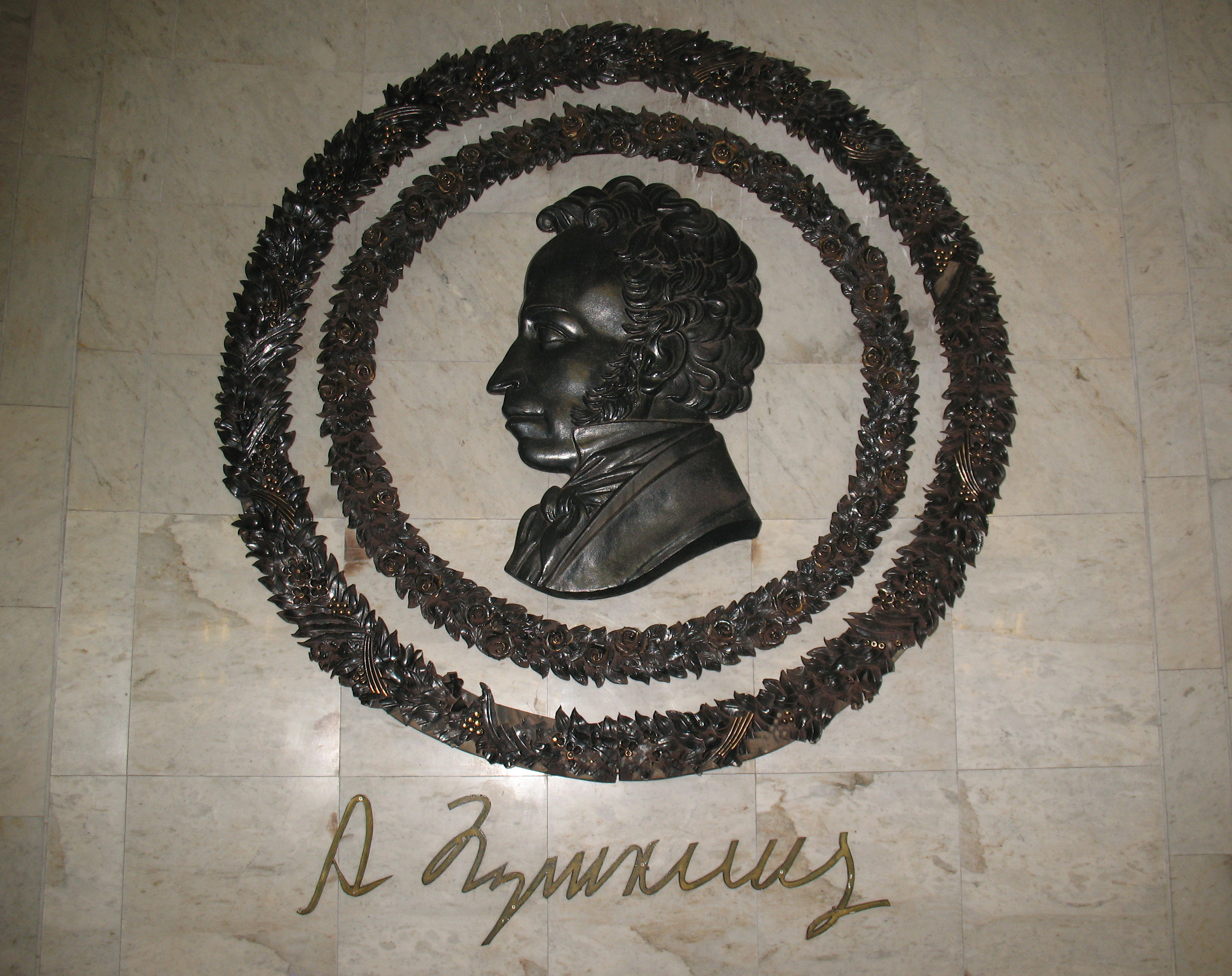
Bust of Pushkin at Yaroslava Mudroho Station (now removed due to the 2022 Russian invasion of Ukraine)

On 28 November 2021, honored journalist and announcer of Kharkiv Radio, Yuriy Vasylovych Virchenko, passed away on the platform of the Kyivska station. His voice had been used for announcements on the stations and in the metro trains for over 40 years—from the opening of the metro until 2016.

In September 2023 the remaining Russian-language inscriptions then still visible on the walls of Kharkiv metro stations were replaced with ones in the Ukrainian language. On 29 April 2024, the stations Pushkinska and Pivdennyi Vokzal were renamed to Yaroslava Mudroho and Vokzalna accordingly. On 26 July 2024, the stations Heroiv Pratsi, Zavod Imeni Malysheva and Prospekt Haharina were renamed to Saltivska, Zavodska, and Levada respectively.

== Rolling stock ==
Electric train composed of Ezh3 / Em-508T cars in the 75 Years of the Great Victory livery on the Kholodnohirsko–Zavodska line

Refurbished Ezh3 electric train on the Kholodnohirsko–Zavodska line

New 81-7036/7037 electric train at Yaroslava Mudroho station

The passenger rolling stock includes not only 77 older cars of the Ezh3 type, 40 cars of the Em-508T type, 112 cars of the 81-717/714 type, and 28 cars of the 81-717.5/714.5 type. Since 1992, the Kharkiv Metro has begun purchasing 20 cars of the 81-718/719 model, 5 cars of the 81-718.0/719.0 model, and 15 cars of the 81-718.2/719.2 model, which feature improved technical and economic performance as well as enhanced passenger comfort.

In July 2015, the metro received one new train set of the 81-7036/7037 model.

On 1 September 2017, the Kholodnogirsko-Zavodska Line began operating 25 modernized Ezh3-type cars (originally manufactured in 1974–1975). New components and engines were installed, and both the exterior and interior were refurbished.

The purchase of trains with open gangways (inter-car passage) is planned, which had been intended even before the Russian invasion of Ukraine. Similarly to the Kyiv Metro, it is planned that two “Nomernyi” cars will be transferred from the Warsaw Metro.

For service operations, the rolling stock includes 4 AGMu-type motor cars, 4 DMm-type motor locomotives, 1 ALg-type motor car, 1 DGKU-type motor car for work on the depot’s surface tracks, and 1 Ez3-type car for shunting operations within the depot.

Until 20 June 2022, a track-measuring car of type “D” No. 2302 (the only car of this type in the metro), was in use. It was completely destroyed during the night of 20–21 June when a missile struck the Nemishlyanske depot during the rocket attack on Kharkiv.

Picture	Type	Manufacturer	Since
	Ezh3, Em-508T	(Soviet Union) Mytishchi Machine-Building Plant	1975
	81-717/714 81-717.5/714.5	(Soviet Union) Mytishchi Machine-Building Plant/Metrowagonmash (Soviet Union) Leningrad Carriage Works (LVZ)	1984 (81-717/714) 1989 (81-717.5/714.5)
	81-718/719 81-718.0/719.0 81-718.2/719.2	Metrowagonmash	1992 (81-718/719) 1998 (81-718.0/719.0) 2003 (81-718.2/719.2)
	81-7036/7037	KVBZ	2015
	81-710.1 (modernized Ezh3, Em-508T)	(Soviet Union) Mytishchi Machine-Building Plant (original trains) Saltivske depot (modernization)	2017

== Ticketing ==
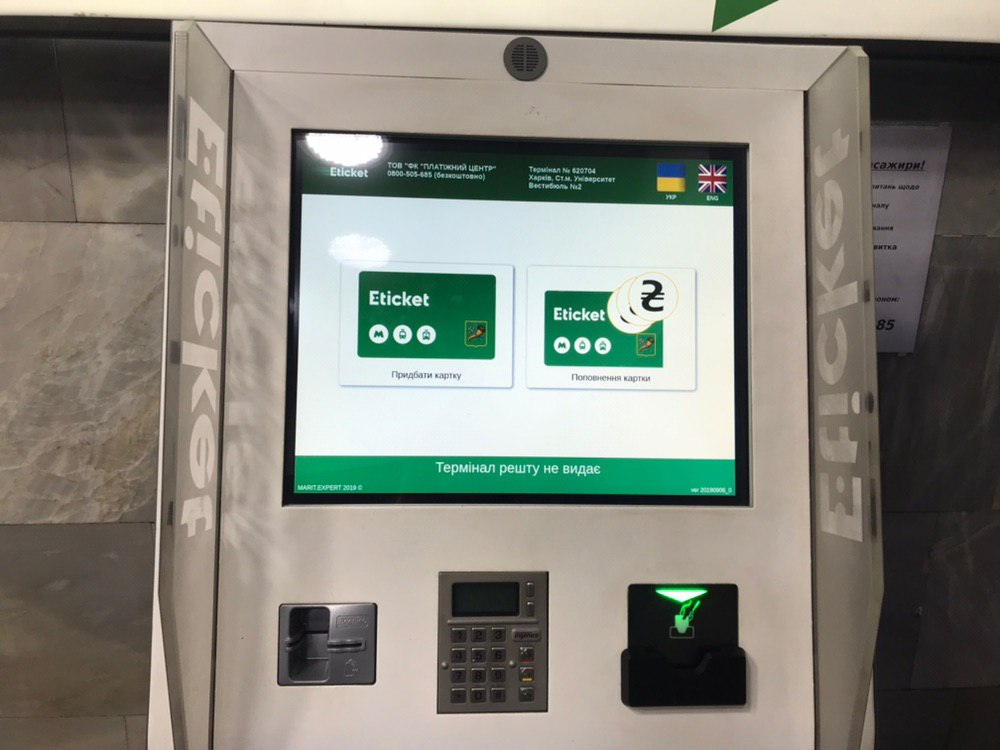
Terminal for recharging the unified transport card (E-ticket)

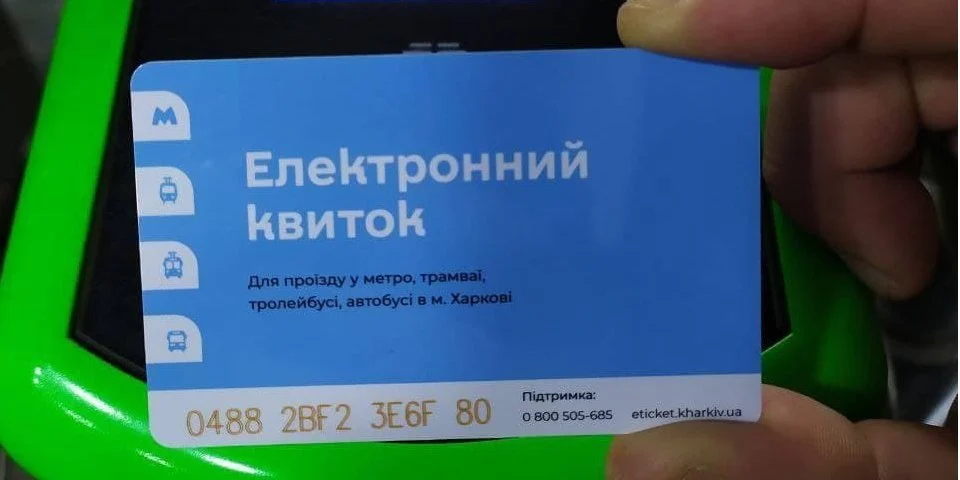
E-ticket unified transport card

Metro refused to sell tokens through ticket offices in 2010. Instead of cash registers, ticket machines and electronic card top-up machines are installed at each station. The installation of automatic machines began at the Maidan Konstytutsii station of the Kholodnohirsko–Zavodska line.

A single ride costs ₴8.00 regardless of destination and number of transits within the metro.

The ride can be paid for by:

- paper barcode tickets
- contactless card E-Ticket
- contactless bank card (as well as a smartphone or other NFC-enabled device) on blue-colored turnstiles directly

E-Ticket cards or paper barcode tickets can be purchased using terminals installed on stations. Terminals accept cash only. E-Ticket cards can be also used in the Kharkiv tram, trolleybus and municipal red bus.

Using the metro system, along with all municipal public transport, became free starting at 24 February 2022.

== See also ==
- Trams in Kharkiv
- Kyiv Metro
- Dnipro Metro
- Kryvyi Rih Metrotram
