= Saltivka =

Residential area in Kharkiv, Ukraine

Coordinates: 50°01′N 36°21′E

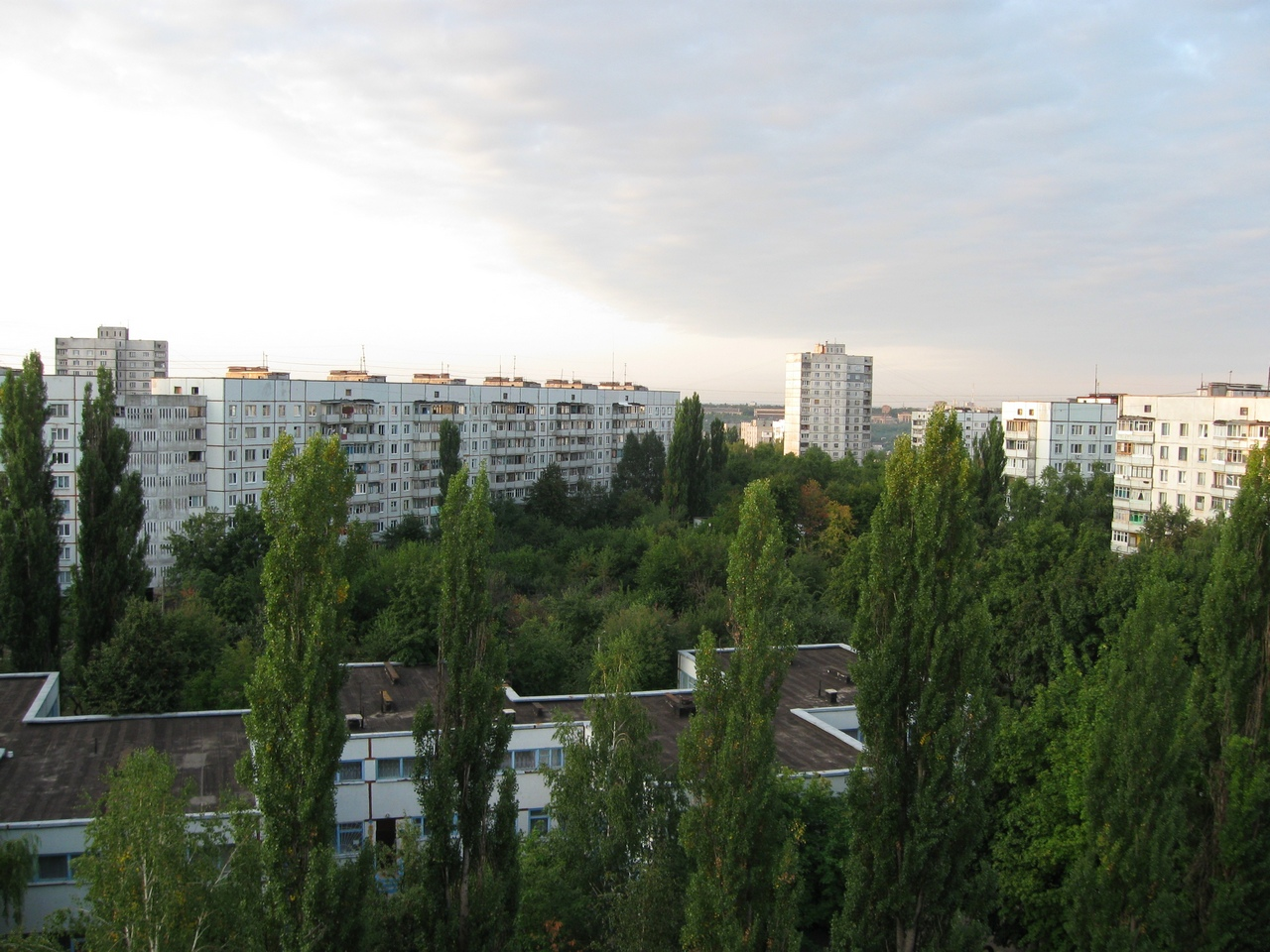
Microdistrict 624 in Saltivka

Saltivka (Ukrainian: Салтiвка; Russian: Салтовка) is a large residential area located in the northeastern region of Kharkiv in eastern Ukraine. It covers most of the eponymous Saltivskyi District with parts extending into the Kyivskyi District and Nemyshlyanskyi District. It is sometimes called the Saltivskyi Masyv, as it realizes a soviet urban planning concept which consist of several different neighborhoods with similar architectural design. Despite its reputation as a deprived residential area with outdated and dilapidated housing, more than a third of Kharkiv's total population resides within its boundaries. According to various estimates, some 400–800,000 people used to live there, making it one of the largest residential areas in Ukraine.

The name of the neighborhood is derived from the road that leads to Staryi Saltiv and Verkhnii Saltiv in Chuhuiv Raion.

The exact borders of the area aren't well defined, traditionally it refers to a part of the city located between the Kharkiv river and its tributary Nemyshlia, though some might exclude from it the areas not covered by soviet tower blocks. Prior to the 1960s, Saltivka was called Saltivsky village, and consisted of a few small scattered areas with three-story buildings (Tyurinka, Stara Saltivka, Shevchenky, Selyshche imeni Kirova).

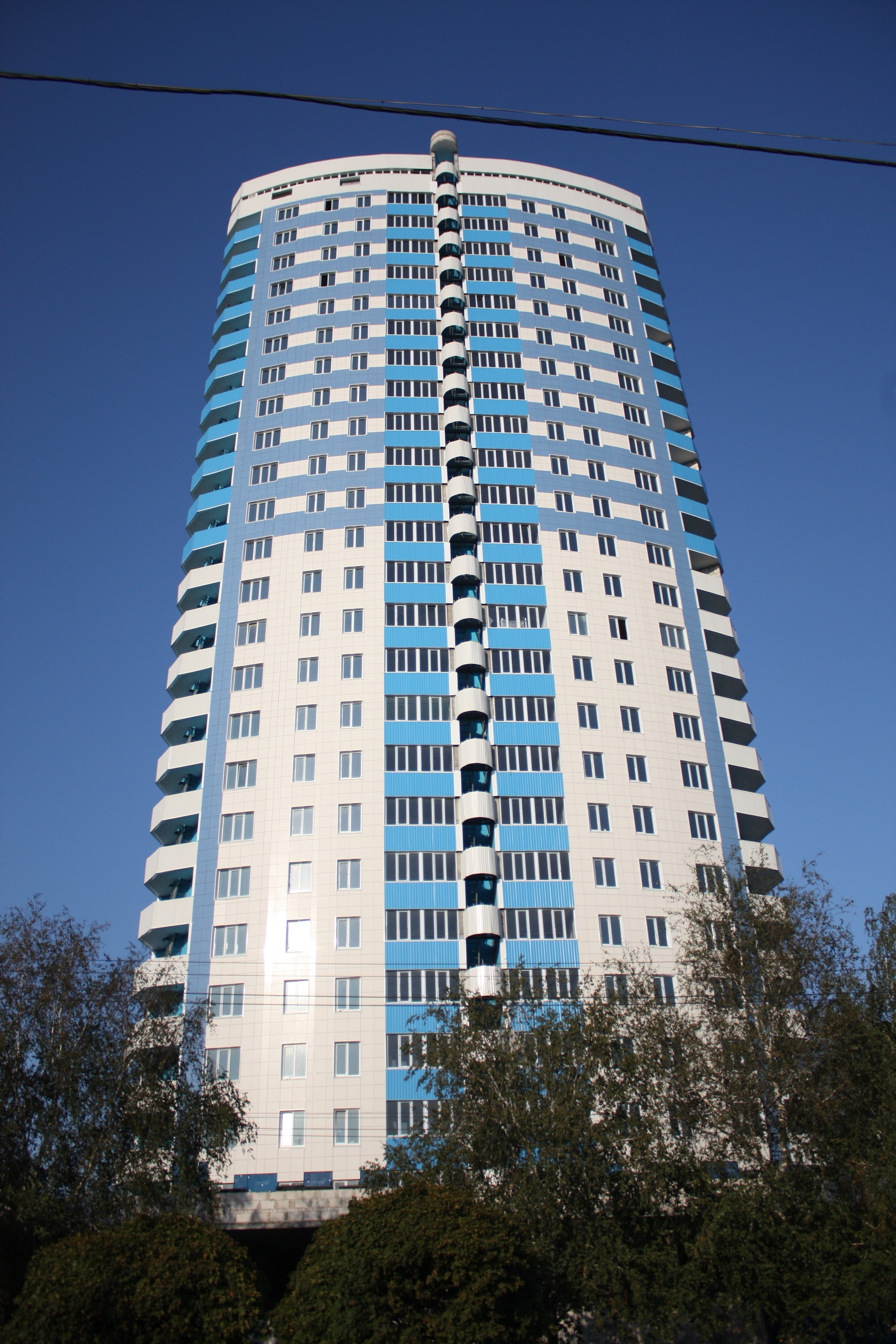
One of the few modern building in Saltivka, built in 2008

Saltivka was conceived from the start as a purely residential neighborhood according to the Soviet concept of creating so-called sleeping districts in large industrial cities. Saltivka has almost no industrial compounds, but there are many shops and markets for residents. The neighborhood includes one of the largest warehouse markets in Ukraine near the Akademika Barabashova station of the Kharkiv metro. The Barabashov marketplace, according to some sources, is the largest in Europe.

Residential development was initiated by the Dipromisto Institute in 1963. Saltivka's residential panel buildings typically have 9, 12 and 16 floors, and more rarely, 5 floors. Separate high-rise buildings were constructed from 1967, and construction on the bulk of the buildings in Saltivka began in the 1970s. Few new buildings have been added since the 1990s, mostly near the Studentska and Saltivska metro stations.

Saltivka was shelled on a daily basis and heavily damaged during the 2022 Russian invasion of Ukraine.

== Historical neighborhoods of Saltivka ==
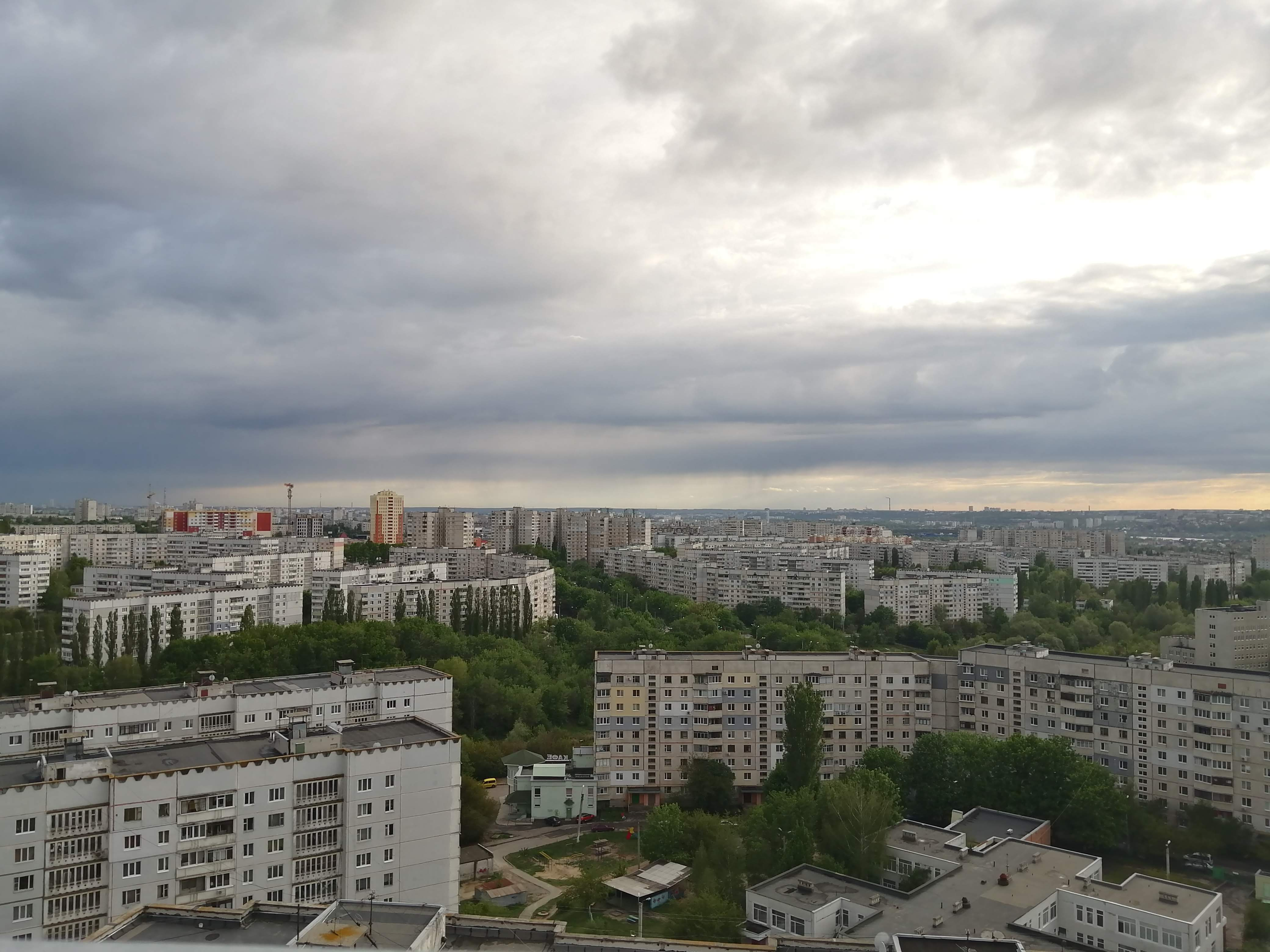
Panorama of Pivnichna (North) Saltivka

- Tyurynka, or Tyuryna Dacha (often misspelled as Tyurenka), is the oldest neighborhood of Saltivka. It originally developed around Tyuryn Lake and borders the neighborhoods of Zhuravlivka, Rashkina Dacha, Saburova Dacha, and Saltivka proper. The area spans Tyurynska Street and the beginning of Akademika Pavlova Street (from there to the Kharkiv River). The neighborhood consists primarily of private housing and two-story residential buildings dating from the 1900s to the 1950s. It features a small but significantly deep lake, a mineral spring, and the former Tyuryn Garden located just above them.
- Stara Saltivka (Old Saltivka) is a neighborhood characterized by private housing and low-rise developments from the 1920s to the 1950s. It is situated around Akhiyezeriv and Ivana Kamysheva streets, at the beginning of Saltivske Highway, extending to the TEC-3 power station. Before World War II, its eastern border reached what is now Lev Landau Avenue. The Soviet writer Eduard Limonov (Savenko) lived here during his youth on the former Poperechna Street.
- Shevchenky is an area stretching from the Akademika Pavlova metro station and the street of the same name to the left bank of the Kharkiv River. It includes Shevchenkivskyi Lane.
- Pisky (Sands) is a neighborhood centered around the loop of trolleybus routes 34 and 42 on the left bank of the Zhuravlivskyi Hydropark. It encompasses Barabashova Street, local beaches, and a pine grove near the bridge over the Kharkiv River along Neskorenykh Street. Part of the neighborhood (specifically the 522nd Microdistrict) is built on reclaimed land.
  - The 325th Anniversary of Kharkiv Park (also known as Sosnovyi Bor [Pine Forest], and briefly advertised as Zolotyi Bor [Golden Forest] in 2008) is a pine park situated on sandy soil on the right bank of the Kharkiv River. It borders the Velyka Danylivka neighborhood to the north.
- Petrenky is a private housing sector located in the ravine area of the Nemyshlya River. It extends from a sand quarry and the Petrenkivski lanes to the Kulynychi neighborhood on the city's eastern border.
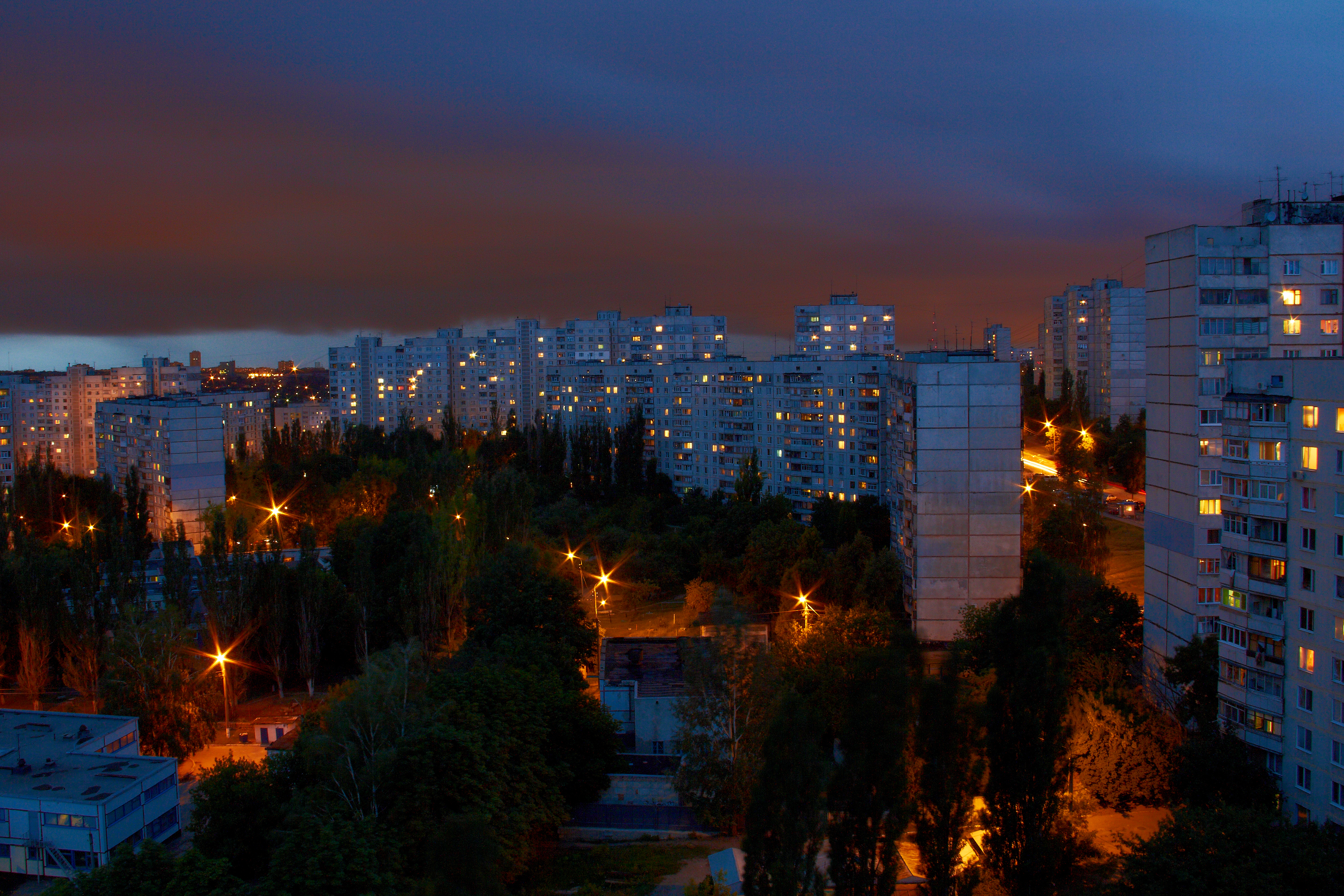
- Saltivskyi residential area in Nemyshlianskyi District
  Nemyshlya is a low-rise private residential neighborhood located along the Nemyshlya River, bounded by Traktorobudivnykiv Avenue and Lev Landau Avenue. It stretches from Yednosti Street on one bank to the Kharkiv–Chuhuiv railway line on the other.
- Kirova is a low-rise microdistrict situated between Akademika Pavlova Street, Yuvileinyi Avenue, and the ravine past Mekhanizatorska Street. In the center of the microdistrict lies a flooded disused quarry, known locally as "the lake" or "the quarry," which is rich in fish. Two smaller flooded quarries are located nearby.
- Pivnichna Saltivka (North Saltivka) is the newest part of the district, located north of the ravine on Buchmy Street and south of the Kharkiv Ring Road. It consists of several microdistricts: Pivnichnyi-1 (Saltivskyi District), Pivnichnyi-2, 3, 4, 5, and the "Internatsionalist" Youth Housing Complex (Kyivskyi District).

=== Microdistricts ===
Saltivka comprises twenty-two large, block-free microdistricts. The numbered microdistricts include (listed from north to south and east to west): 524, 531, 533, 521 (construction number 608), 607, 606, 520, 535, 606A, 605, 604, 603, 602, 601, 624, 625, 522, 626, and 656, among others.

== Attractions ==
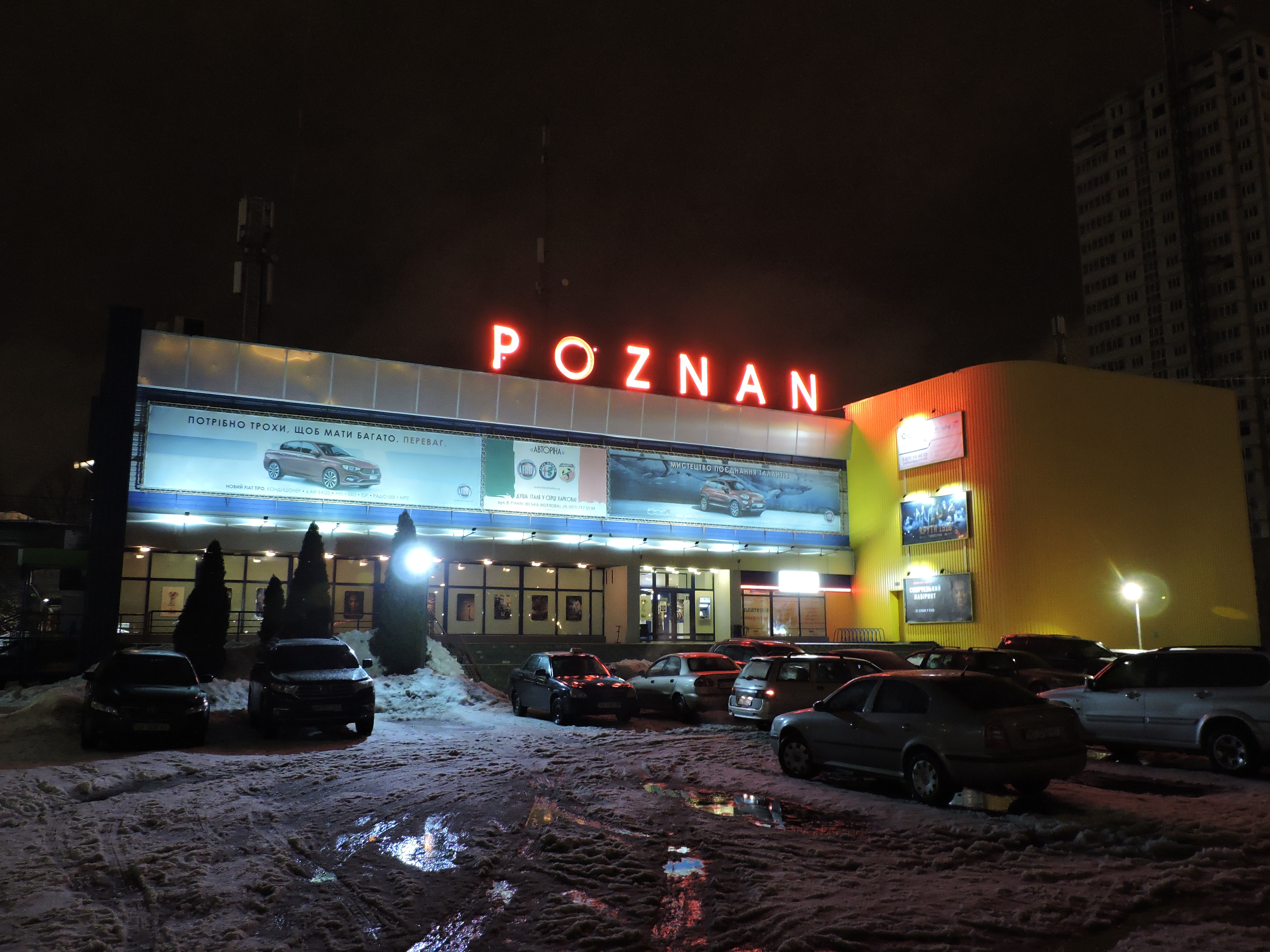
"Poznan" movie theater

- Zhuravlivskyi Hidropark, a recreational space on the Kharkiv river.
- Victory Park - founded in honor of the 40th anniversary of Victory Day in 1985.
- Cinemas "Dafi", "Kinoland", "Poznan"
- Monuments - Unit of Lt. Shyronin at the intersection of Yuvileinyi Prospect and Hvardiytsiv-Shyronintsiv Street, Lomonosov Monument (Traktorobudivnyky Prospect).
- Sports: home field of American football team "Texas"
- Exhibition Center "Radmir", near metro station "Akademika Pavlova".

Saltivka is linked to the city center by the second line of Kharkiv Metro, called Saltivska. Four of the subway lines stations are located in the Saltivka neighborhood, along with its depot. The area is additionally served by four lines of the Kharkiv tram system. One the city's two tram depots is also located in the area, it was once the largest in the former Soviet Union, with an area of 20.8 hectares, however it was almost completely destroyed by russian artillery bombardment.

There are also many trolley, bus, and marshrutka (mini bus) stations and lines that serve the area.

== Saltivka in literature and folklore ==
- The Saltivka settlement is depicted in the autobiographical novels Adolescent Savenko (also translated into English as Memoir of a Russian Punk) and The Young Scoundrel by Eduard Limonov, who spent his youth in the area.
- In the speculative fiction novel We Are to Live Here (Russian: Нам здесь жить) by the Kharkiv-based writing duo H. L. Oldie and Andrey Valentinov, Saltivka is portrayed as a semi-abandoned district heavily damaged by a supernatural cataclysm. In the novel's universe, the city's inhabitants colloquially refer to the area as the "Distant Shithole" (Dalnyaya Sran).
- In 2008, writer Aleksandr Zolotko illustrated the local identity and distinctive regional dialect of Saltivka residents with the following humorous dialogue, highlighting specific local interjections:

— "Excuse me, miss, where are you from?"
— "Ha?" (Ha?)
— "Ah, I see, from Ukraine."
— "Sho?" (What?)
— "From Kharkiv."
— "Tyu!" (An exclamation of surprise or disbelief)
— "From Saltivka."

== Gallery ==
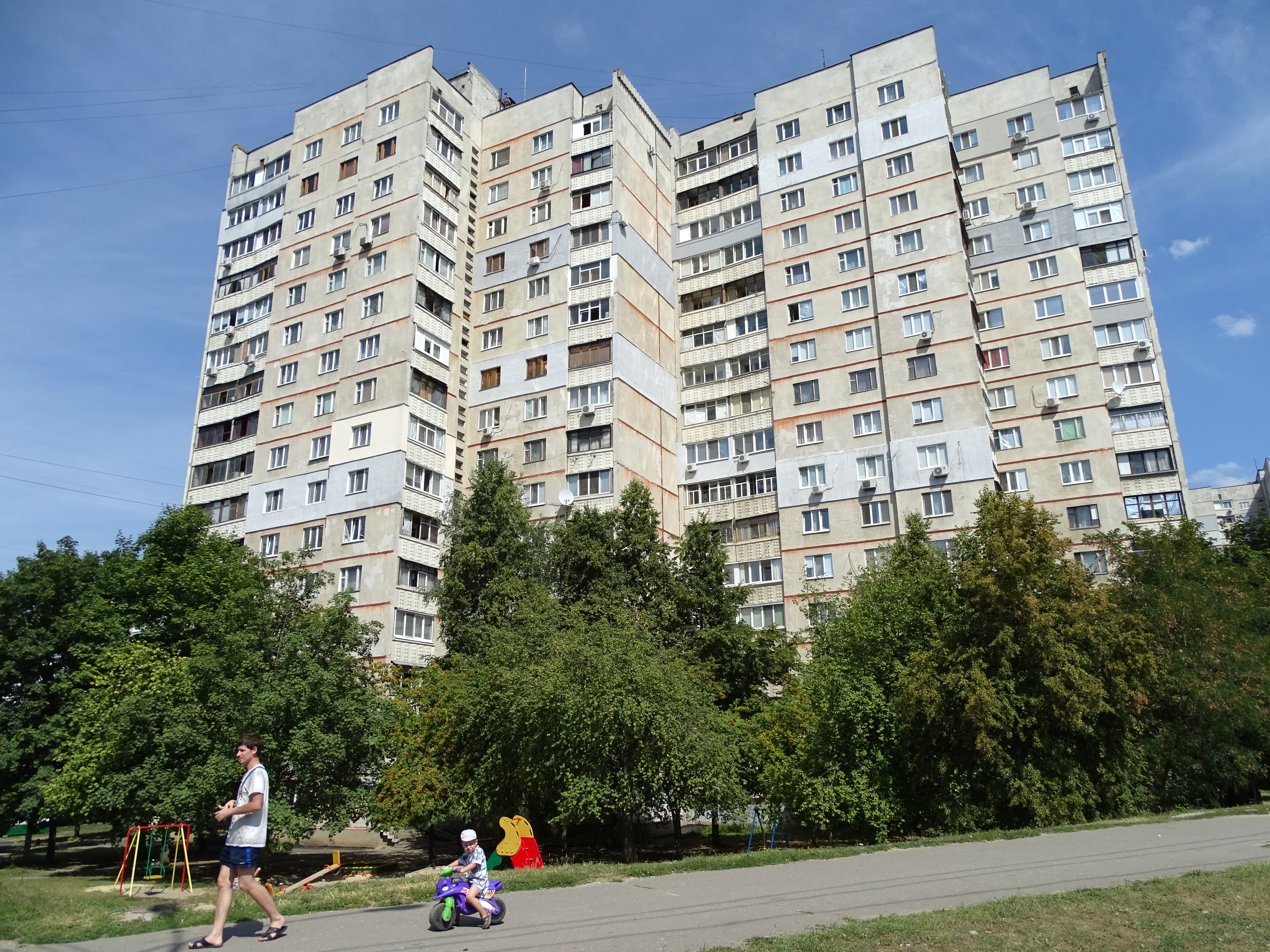
Saltivka residential scene (1) - 2018

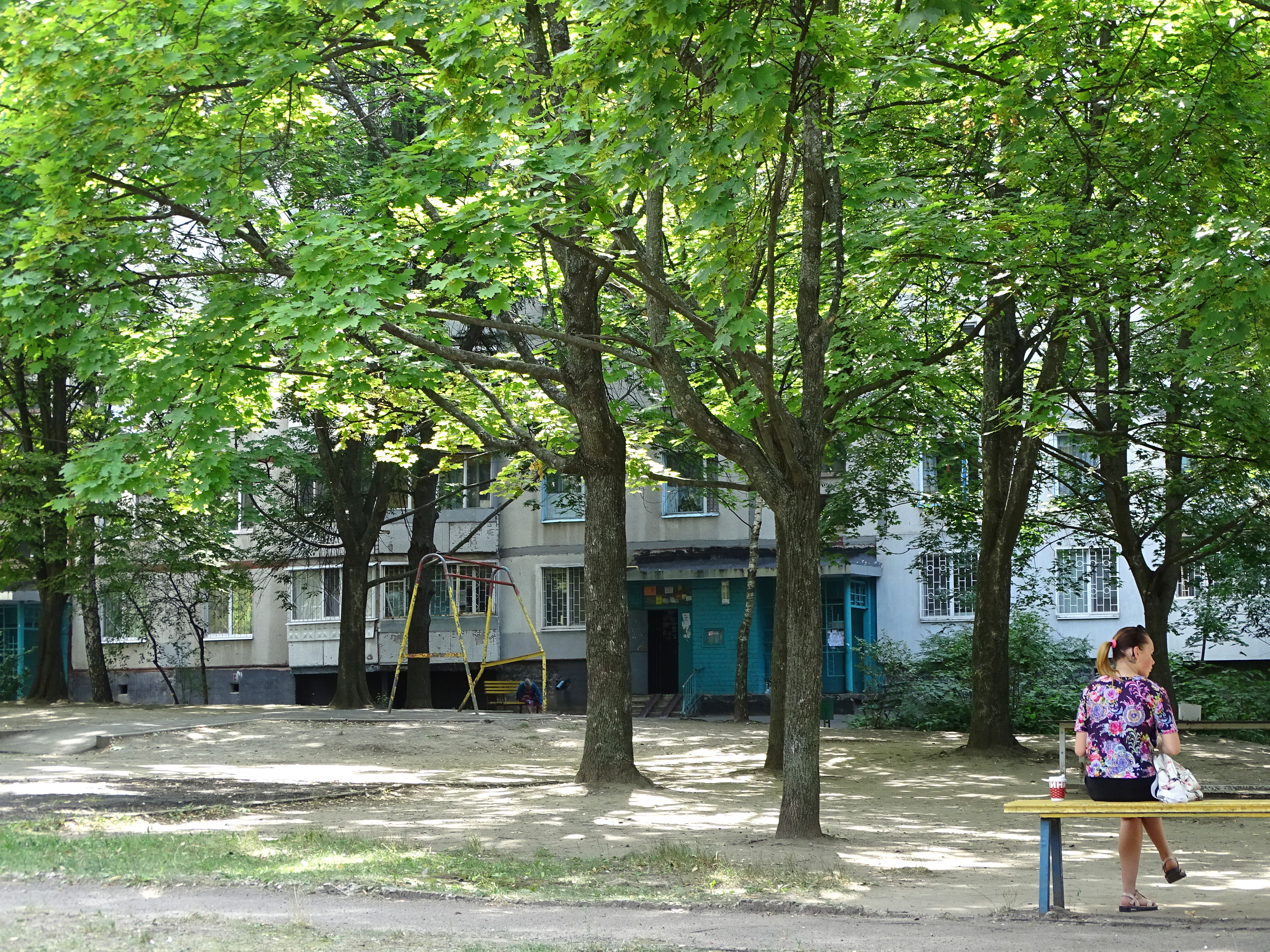
Saltivka residential scene (2) - 2018

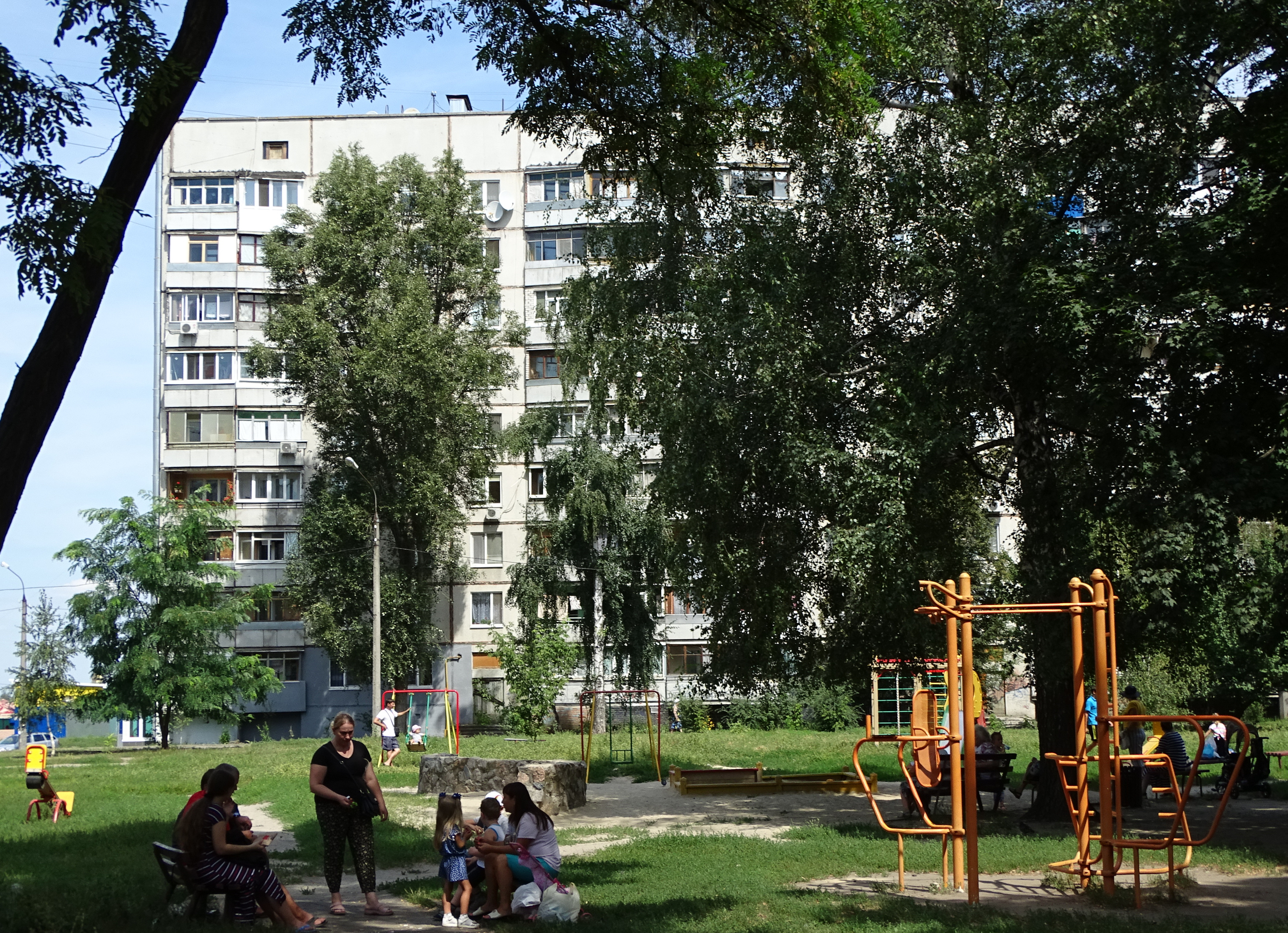
Saltivka residential scene (3) - 2018

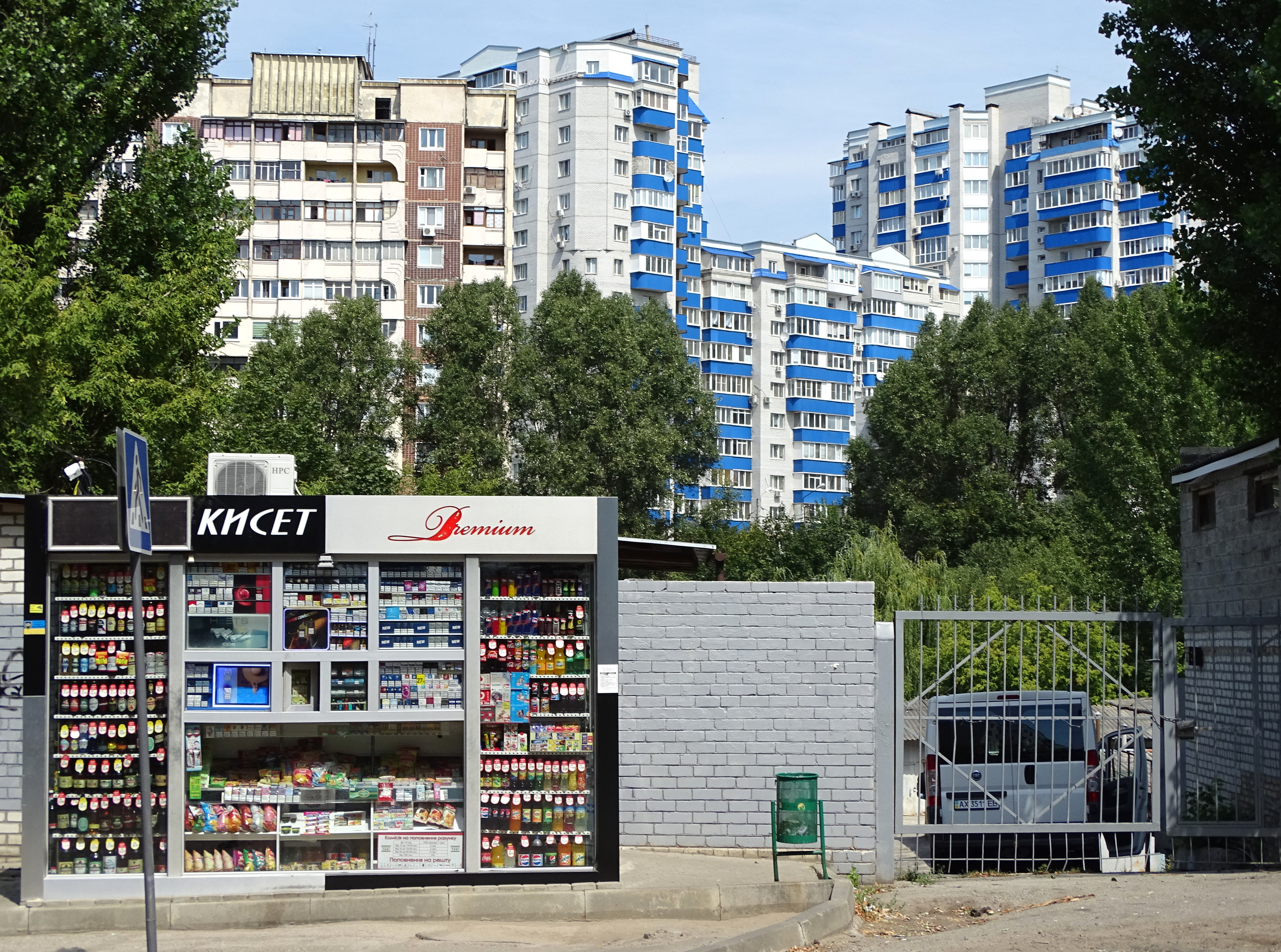
Saltivka residential scene (4) - 2018

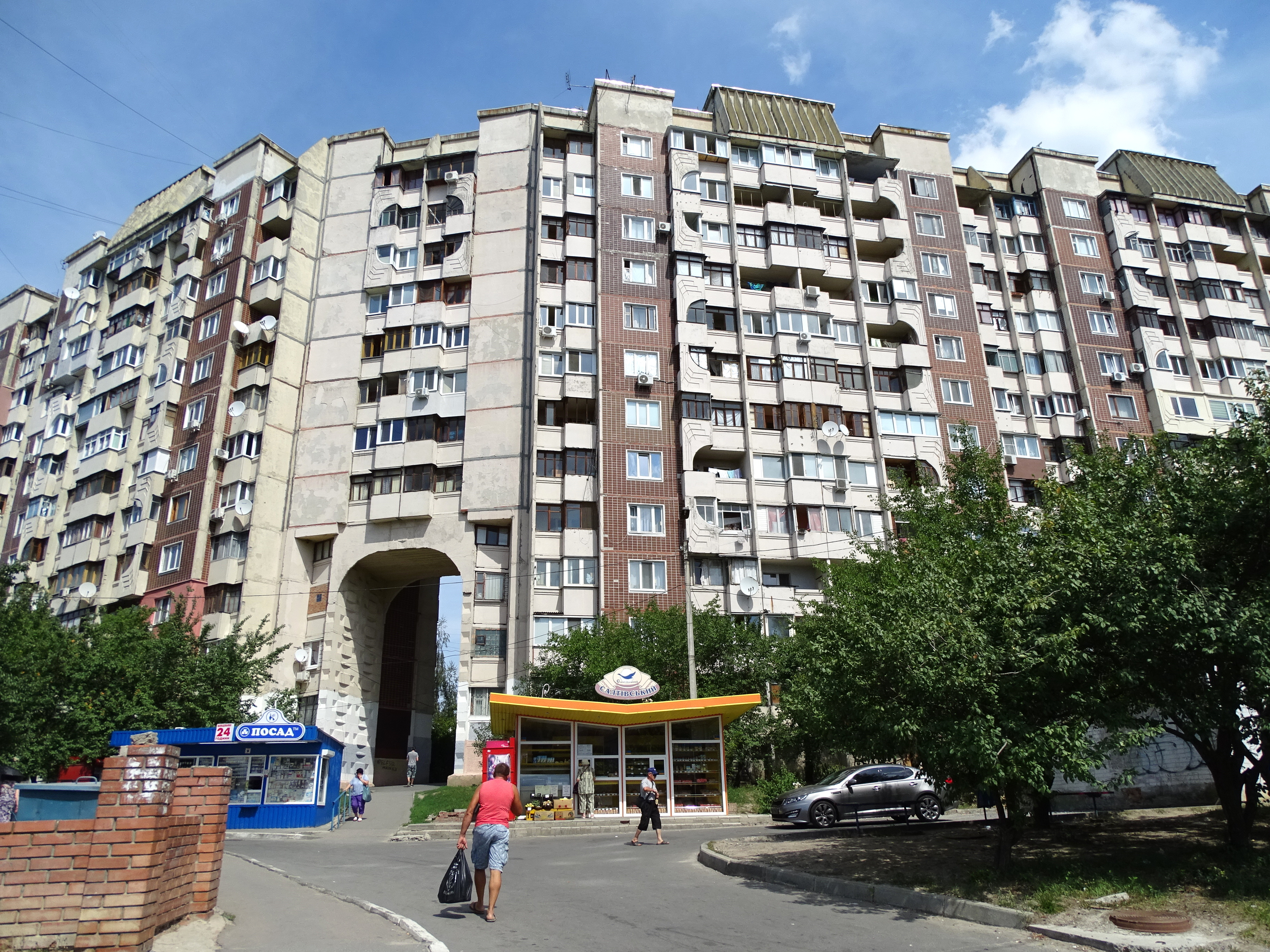
Saltivka residential scene (5) - 2018

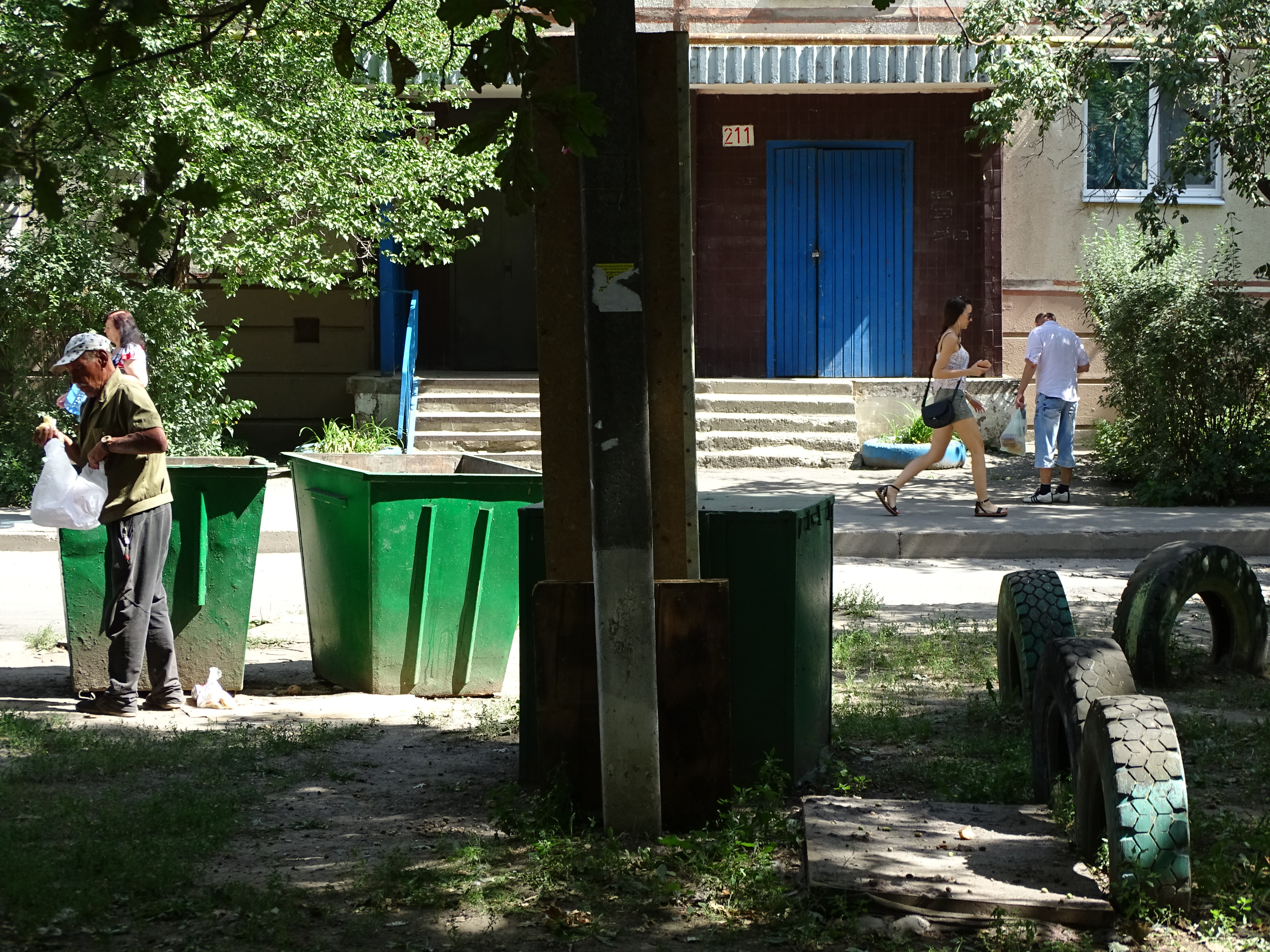
Saltivka residential scene (6) - 2018

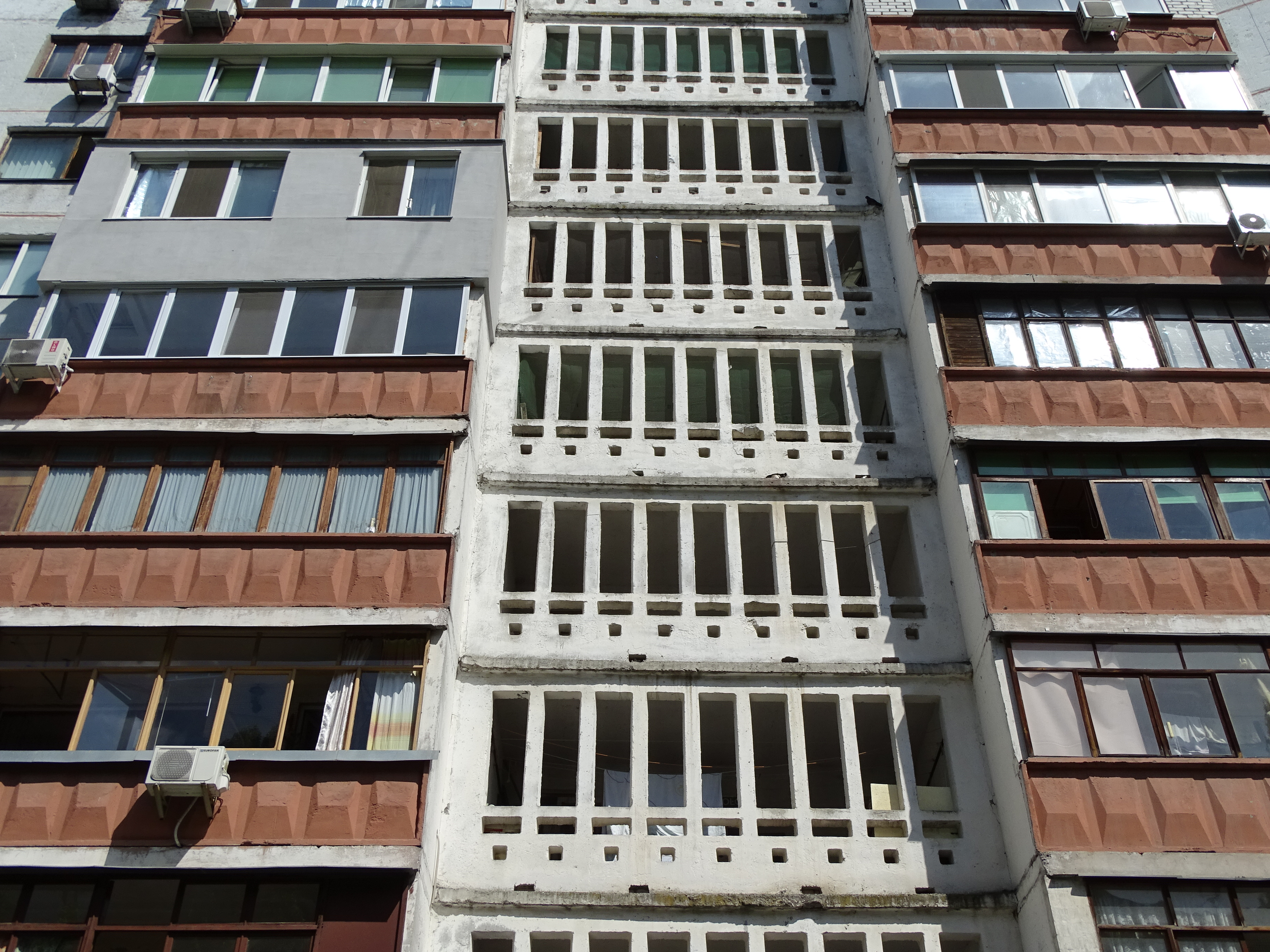
Detail of a typical facade in Saltivka district, 2018

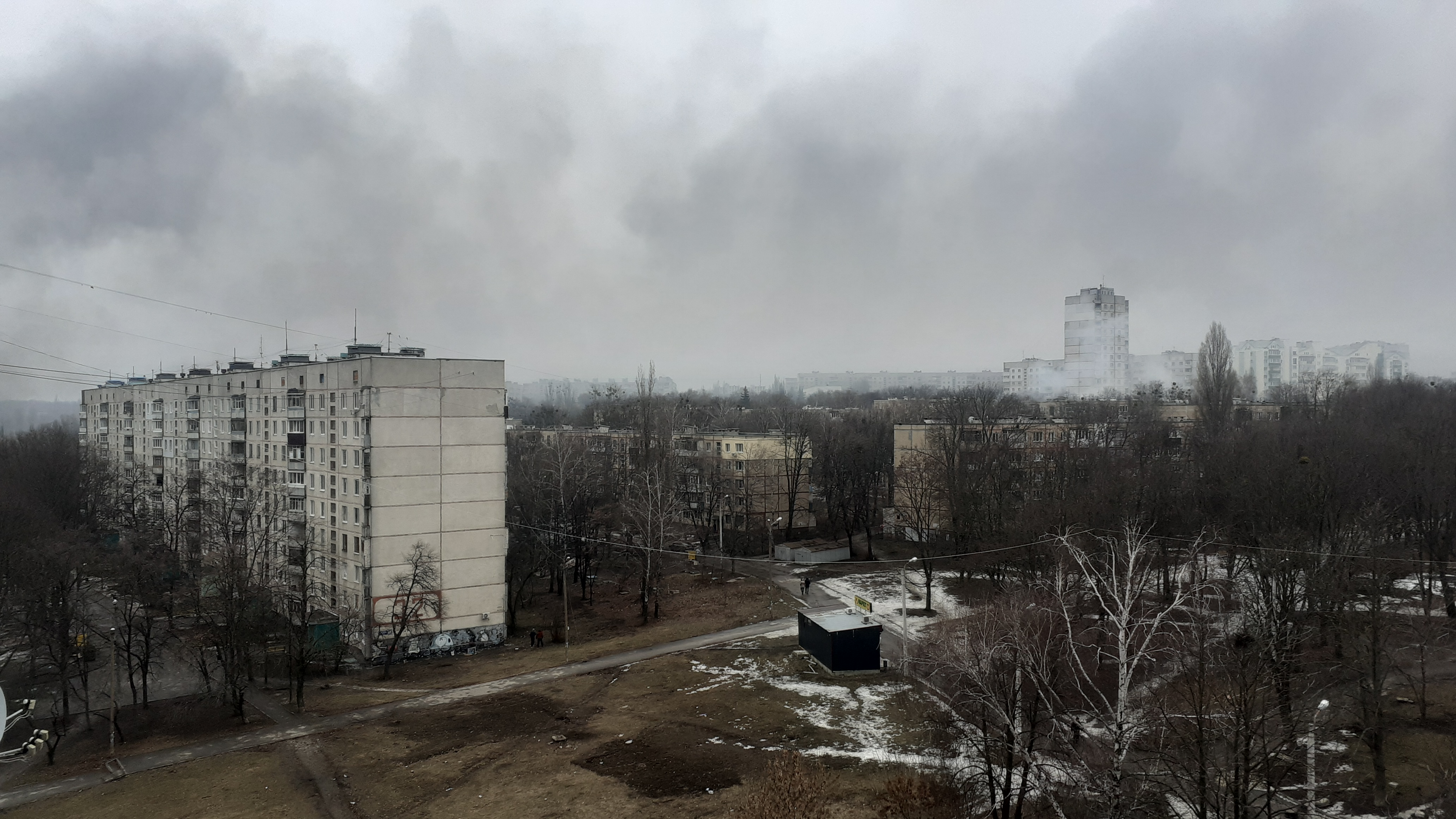
Saltivka after russian shelling in March 2022

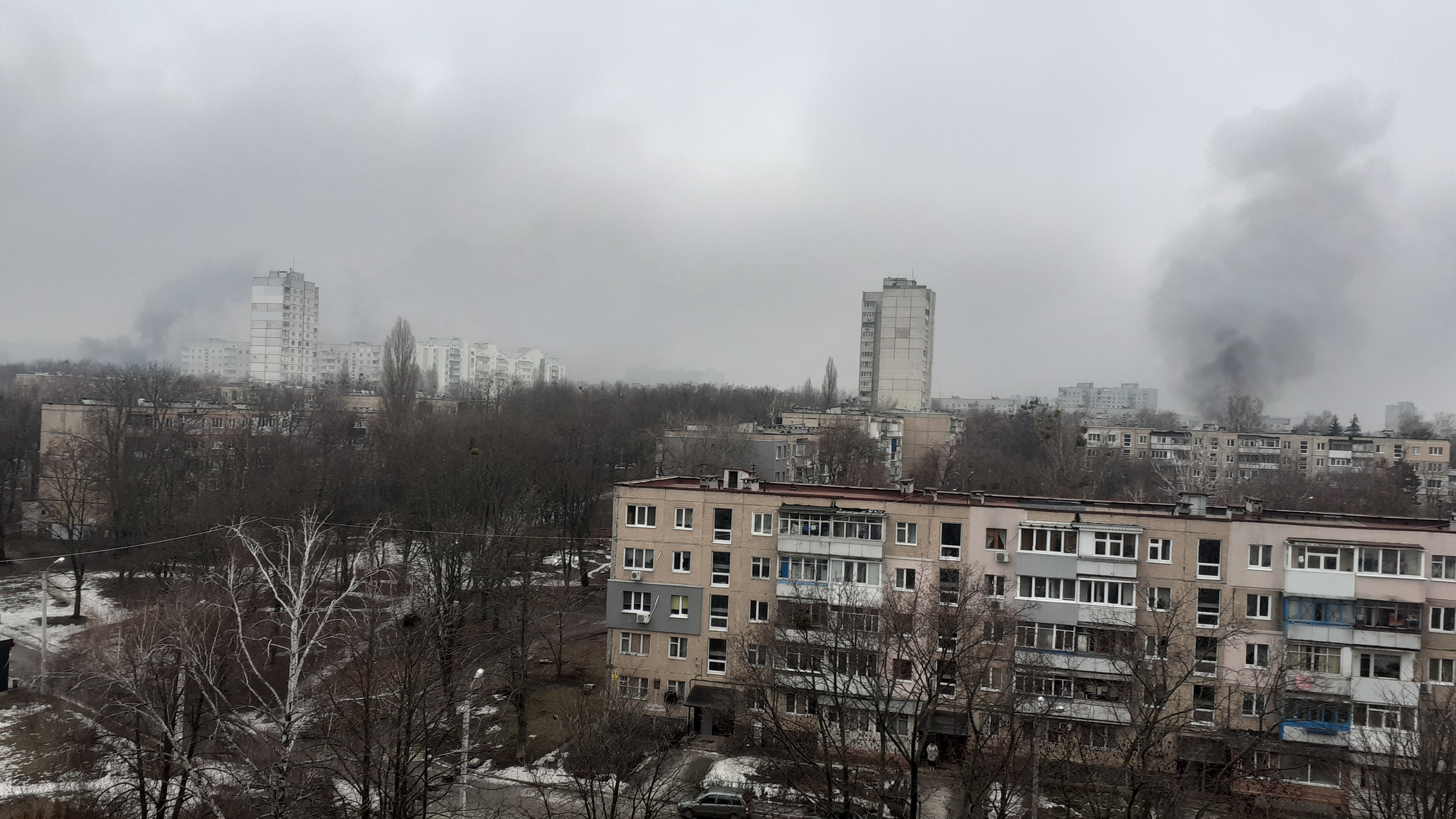
Saltivka after russian shelling in March 2022

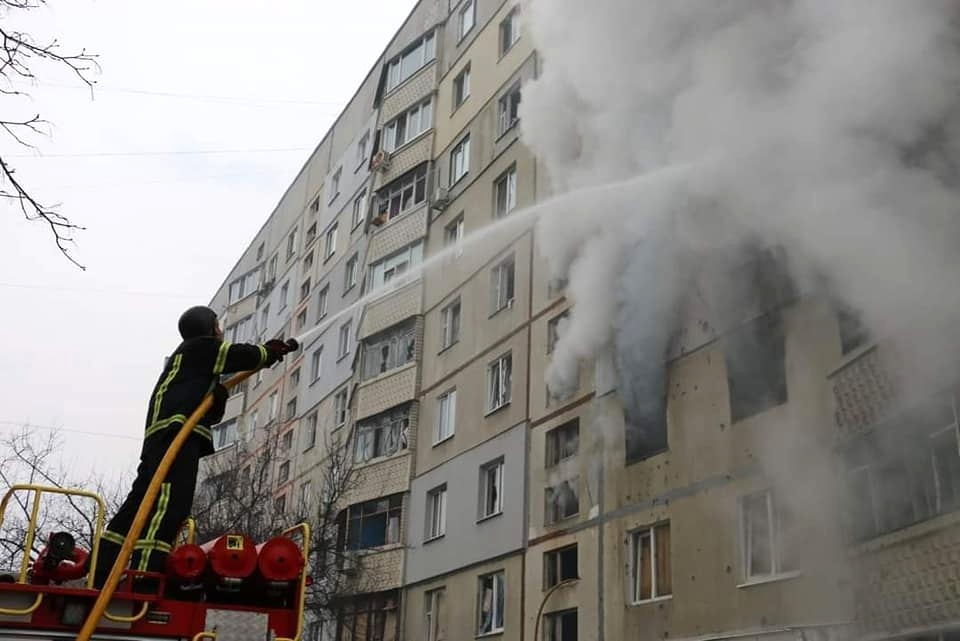
Saltivka after russian shelling in March 2022

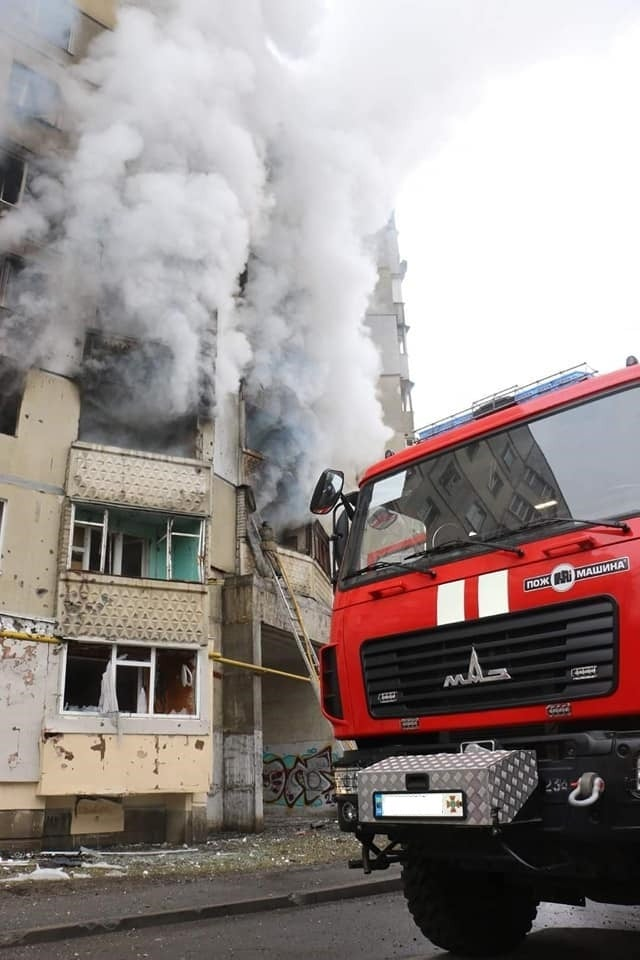
Saltivka after russian shelling in March 2022

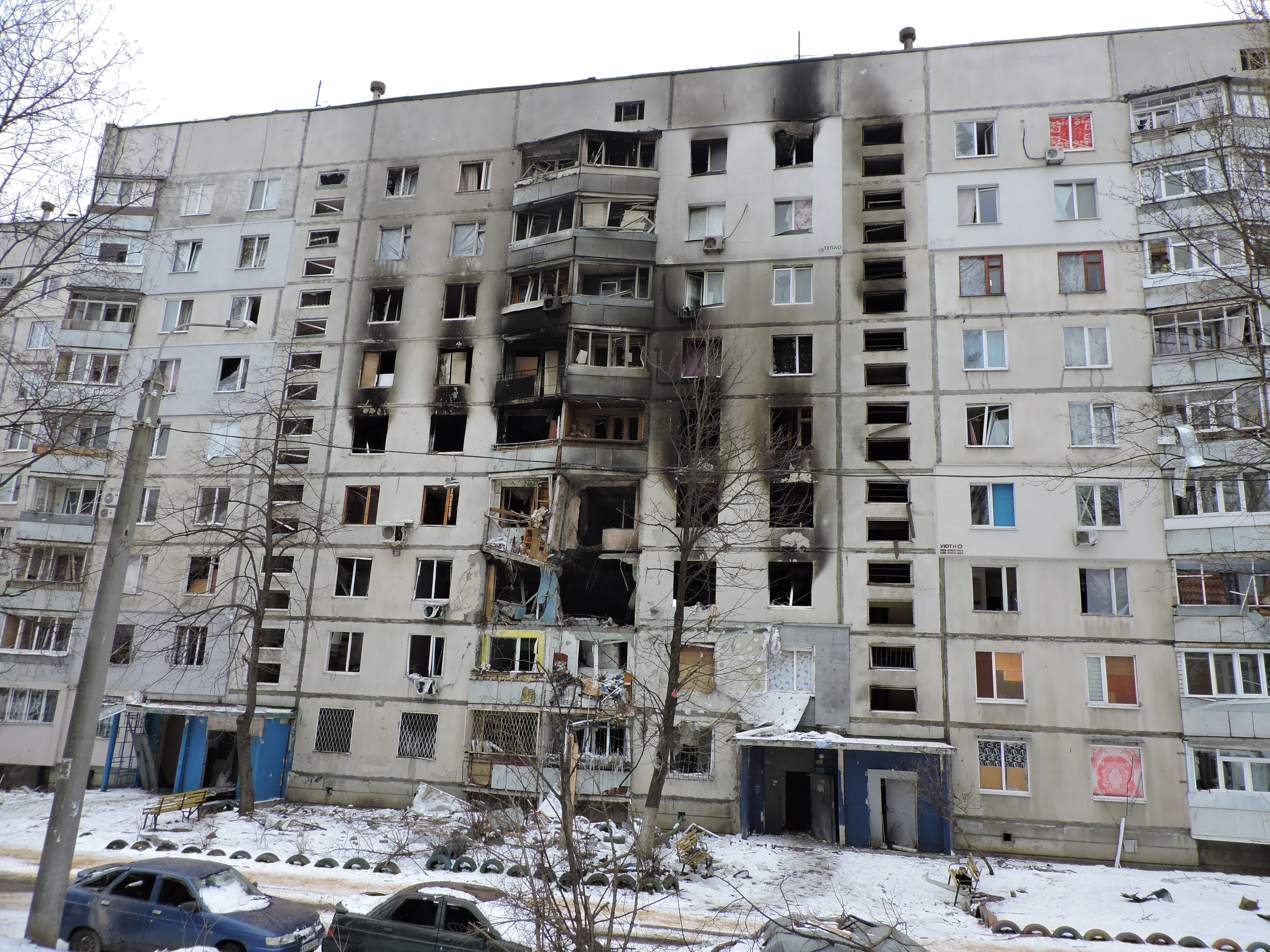
Saltivka after russian shelling in March 2022

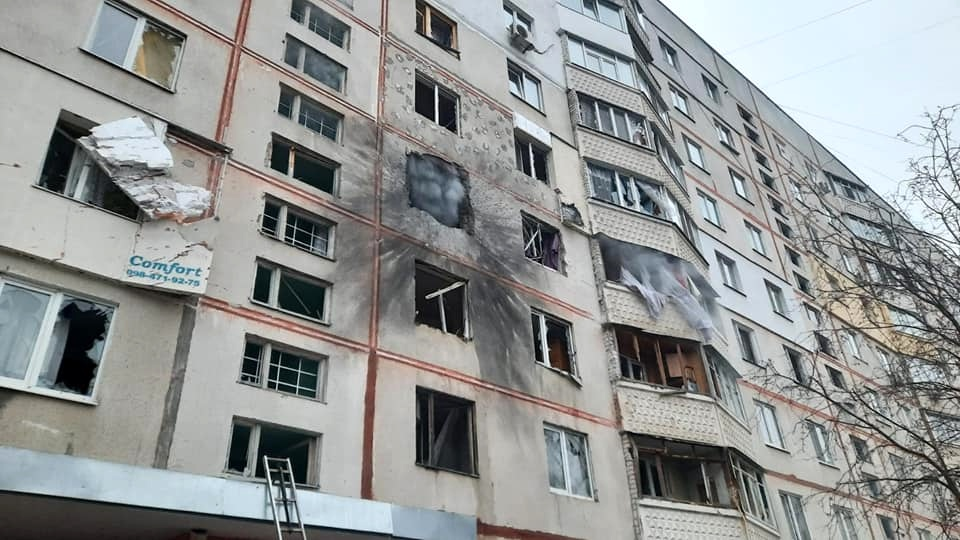
Saltivka after russian shelling in March 2022

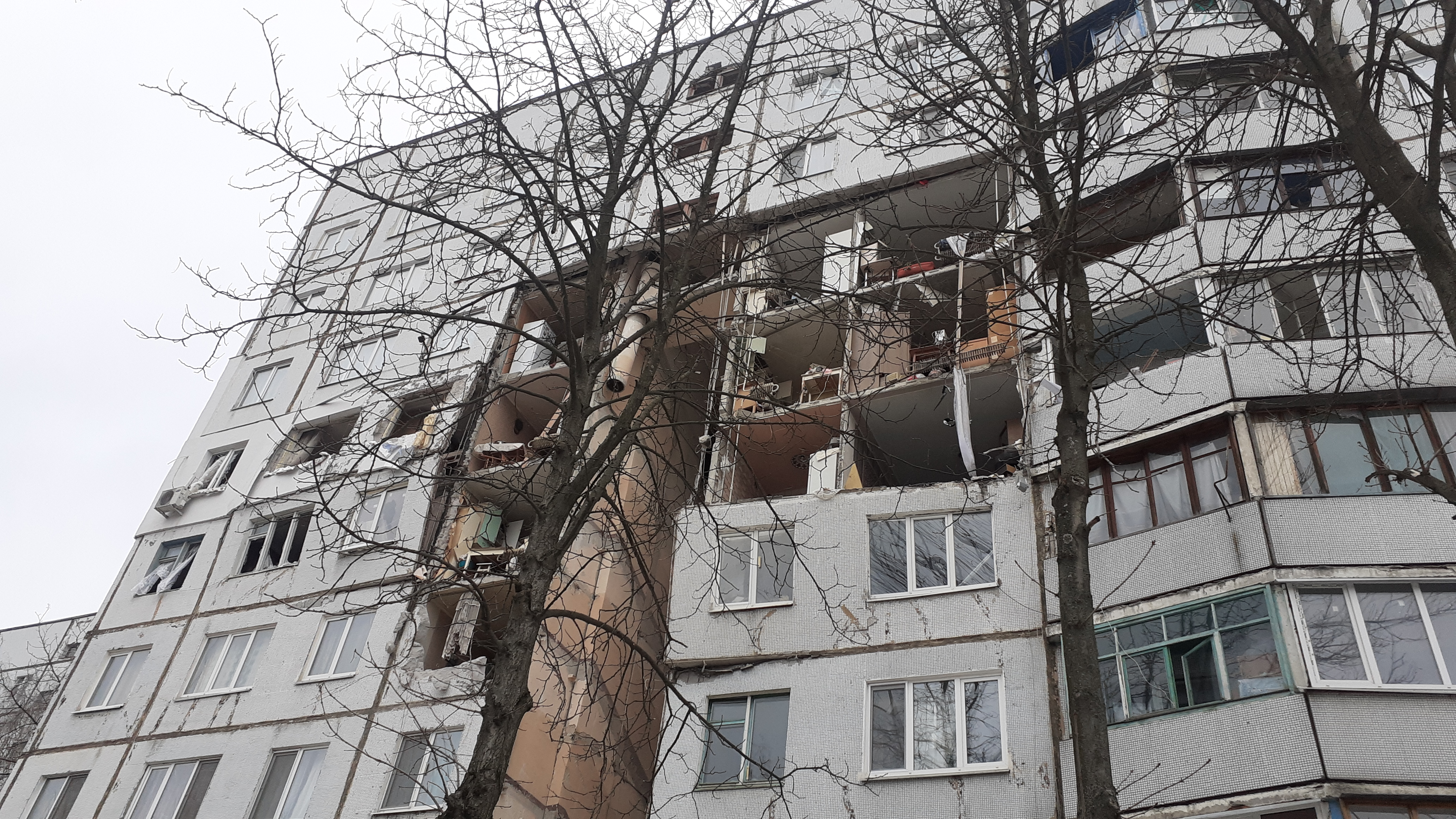
Saltivka after russian shelling in March 2022

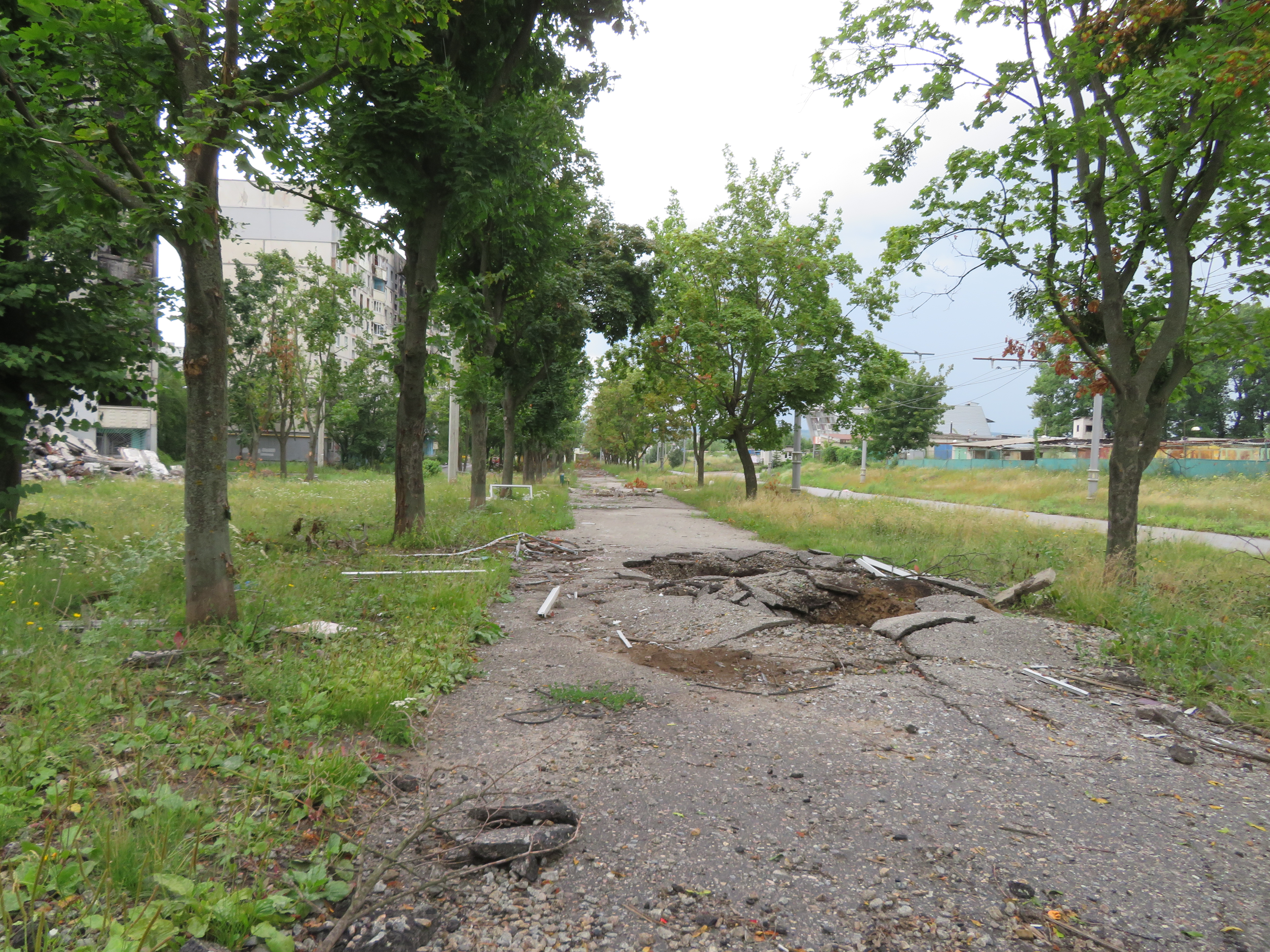
A walkway after Russian artillery strikes. July 2022

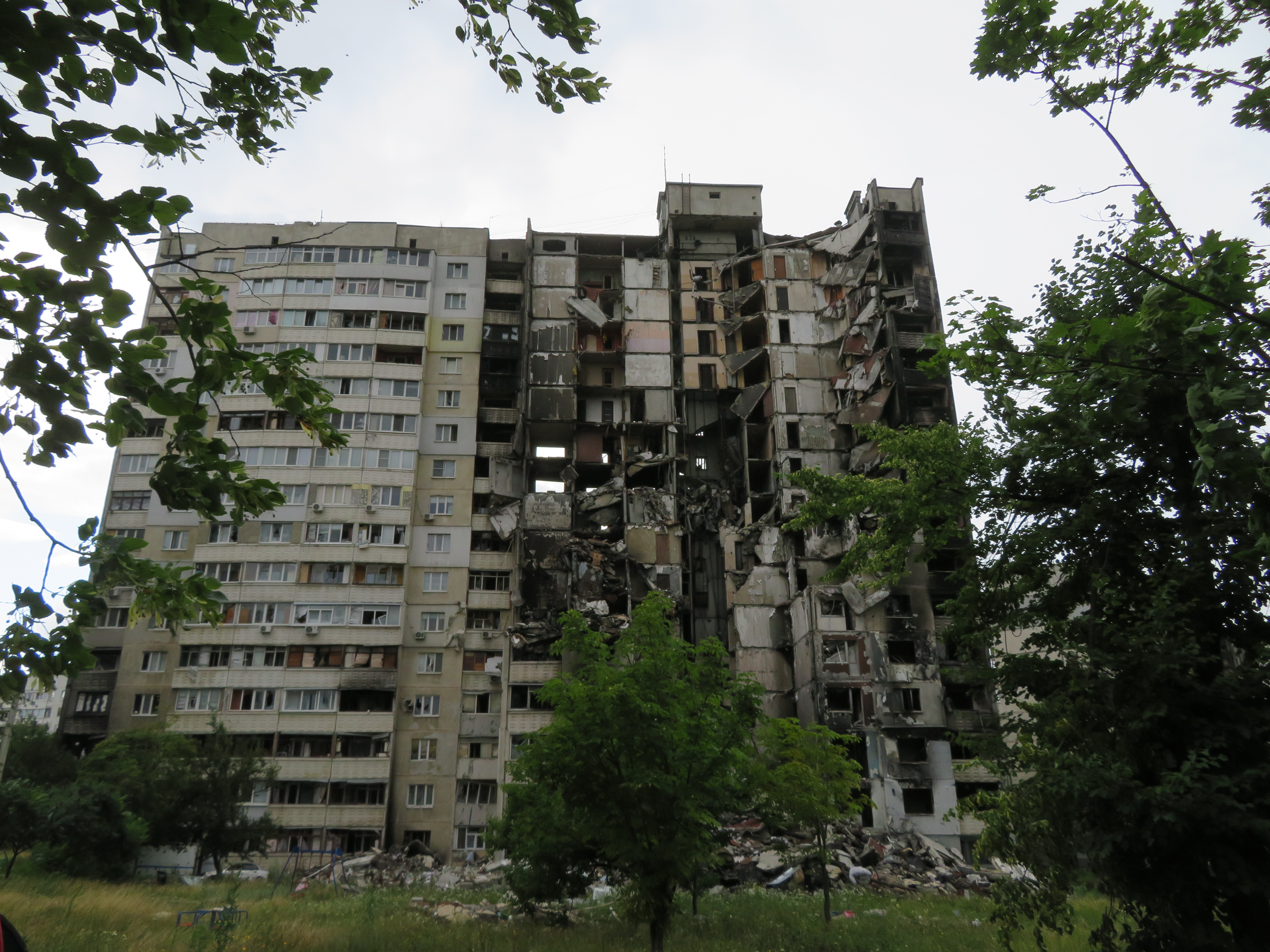
Building Damaged due to fighting. July 2022

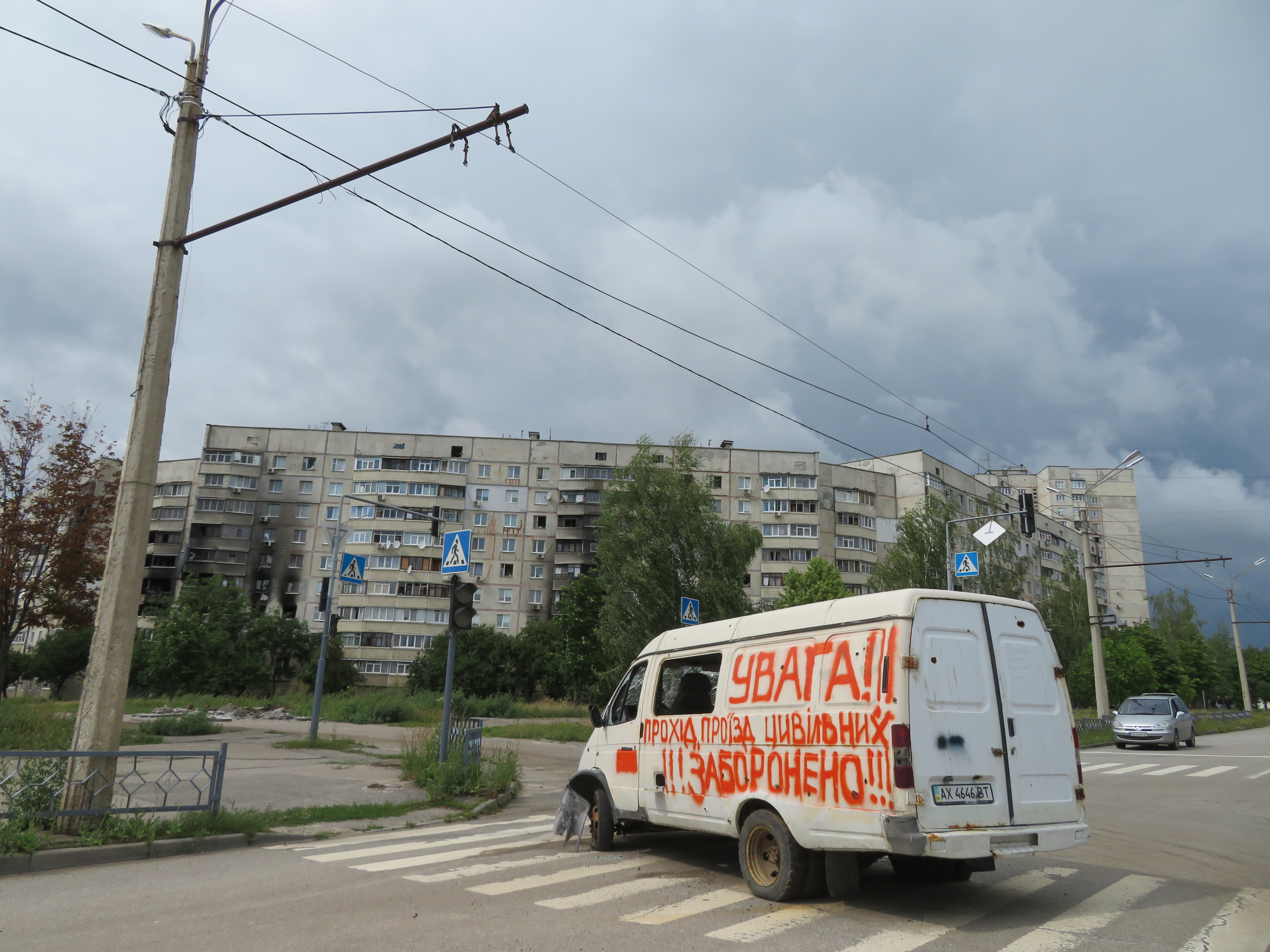
A truck warning people not to go further. July 2022

== Notable people ==
- Eduard Limonov (born 1943) – Russian author and political dissident who spent much of his childhood in Saltivka, in which his Memoir of a Russian Punk is set
- Fuminori Tsuchiko – Japanese volunteer
- Serhiy Zhadan – Ukrainian poet, novelist, essayist, and translator
- Stepan – Ukrainian celebrity cat
- Mykhailo Dobkin – Ukrainian politician
- Sergey Chigrakov – Russian musician and songwriter
- Elena Yakovleva – Russian actress

== See also ==
- Borshchahivka
