= Metro Bridge =

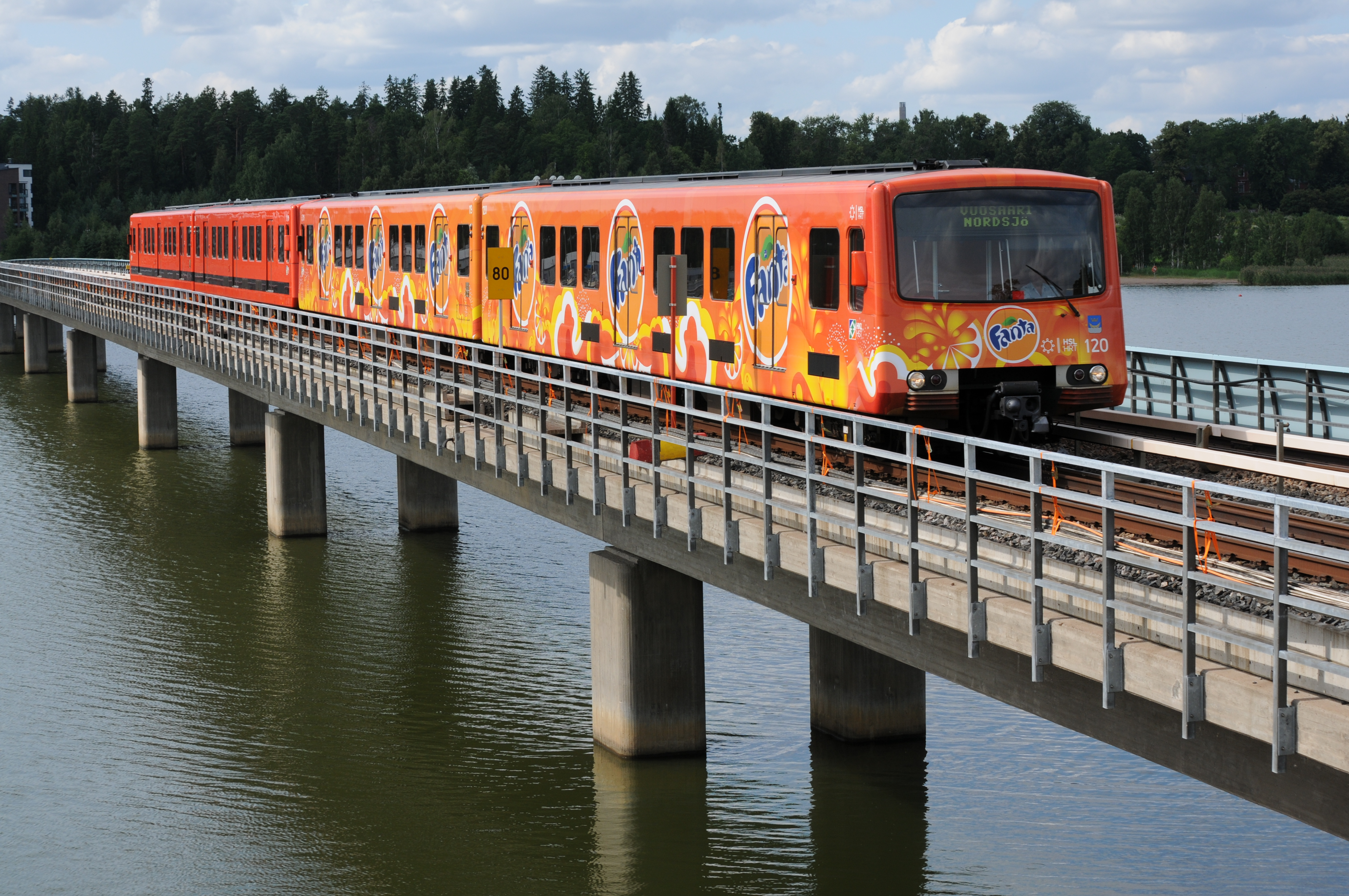

Metro Bridge can refer to a bridge span on a metro (subway) system:

== Russia ==
- Moscow Metro
  - Preobrazhensky Metro Bridge
  - Luzhniki Metro Bridge
  - Smolensky Metro Bridge
- Novosibirsk Metro
  - Novosibirsk Metro Bridge

== Turkey ==
- Istanbul Metro
  - Golden Horn Metro Bridge

== Ukraine ==
- Kyiv Metro
  - Kyiv Metro Bridge, on the Sviatoshynsko-Brovarska Line
  - Pivdennyi Bridge, on the Syretsko-Pecherska Line
  - Podilskyi Metro Bridge, on the Podilsko-Vyhurivska Line (under construction)
- Kharkiv Metro
  - Kharkiv Metro Bridge, on the Saltivska Line

== United Kingdom ==
- Tyne and Wear Metro
  - Byker Metro Bridge

== United States ==
- New York City Subway
  - Broadway Bridge
  - Manhattan Bridge
  - Williamsburg Bridge
