= Fuminori Tsuchiko =

Japanese volunteer

- 土子 文則
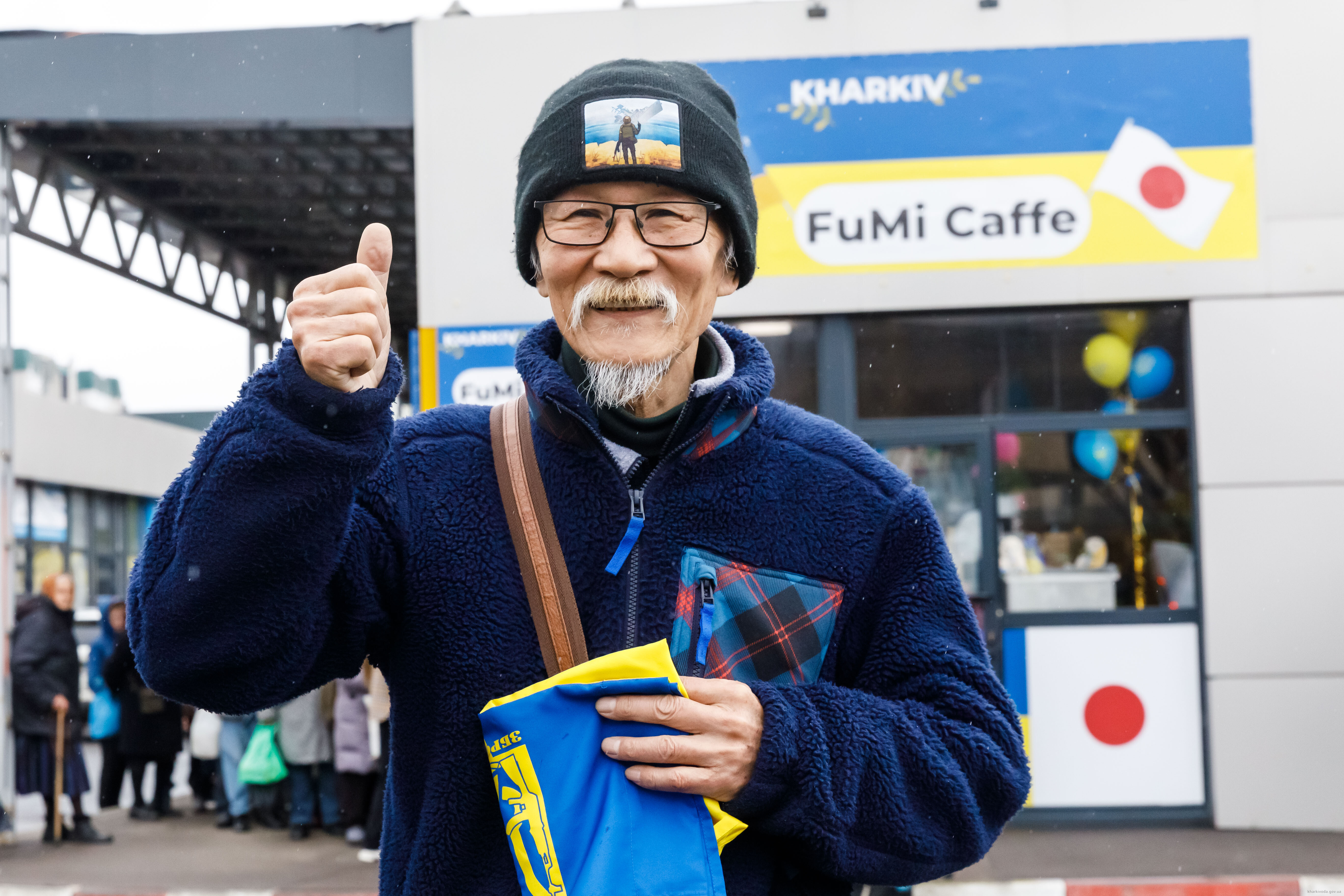
- Fuminori in 2023
- Born: 11 October 1948 (age 77); Nerima, Tokyo, Japan
- Citizenship: Japanese (since 1948); Ukraine (since 2022)
- Known for: Volunteer work in Ukraine
- Awards: National Legend of Ukraine

Fuminori Tsuchiko (Japanese: 土子 文則; Ukrainian: Фумінорі Цучіко; born 11 October 1948) is a Japanese volunteer active in the city of Kharkiv, in eastern Ukraine. Arrived in Ukraine following the Russian invasion of the country in 2022, he helped crowd funding from Japan to help Ukrainian volunteers who provide free food in Kharkiv, originally within the Kharkiv Metro and later from FuMi Caffe owned and operated by a director Ukrainian Nataliya Grama and 10 Ukrainian women in the city's Saltivka district. In recognition of his activities, Fuminori has been awarded the distinction of National Legend of Ukraine.

== Early life and career ==
Fuminori Tsuchiko was born on 11 October 1948, in the Nerima ward of Tokyo. After a career in business, he retired at the age of 60. Taking an interest in the topic of World War II and the Holocaust, he travelled to sites in Poland and Ukraine such as Babi Yar. During the prelude to the Russian invasion of Ukraine, he evacuated to the Polish city of Warsaw upon the warning of the Japanese government.

== Russian invasion of Ukraine ==
After the beginning of the invasion, Fuminori worked with Polish volunteers in Warsaw to provide support to Ukrainian refugees. A week later, he went to work in the city of Rzeszów, where he was told of the lack of food supplies. Moved by this information, Fuminori returned to Ukraine, at first working in Kyiv before arriving at the Kharkiv Metro's Heroiv Pratsi station in May 2022, where he lived from July 2022. Fuminori at a later point sold his home in Japan, and has expressed his intention to remain in Kharkiv following the conclusion of the Russian invasion.

Primarily with the support of Japanese crowdfunding, Fuminori opened a café, named "FuMi Caffe", on 14 April 2023. The café, located in the heavily shelled Saltivka district of Kharkiv, provides free food and is financially supported through donations by philanthropists and Japanese individuals. Following the opening of the café, Fuminori attracted increased attention from the Ukrainian public, including a large donation from Governor of Kharkiv Oblast Oleh Syniehubov.

On 23 August 2023, Fuminori, alongside seven other individuals, was awarded the title of National Legend of Ukraine by President Volodymyr Zelenskyy, owing to his volunteer work.
