= Yaroslava Mudroho (Kharkiv Metro) =

Kharkiv Metro station

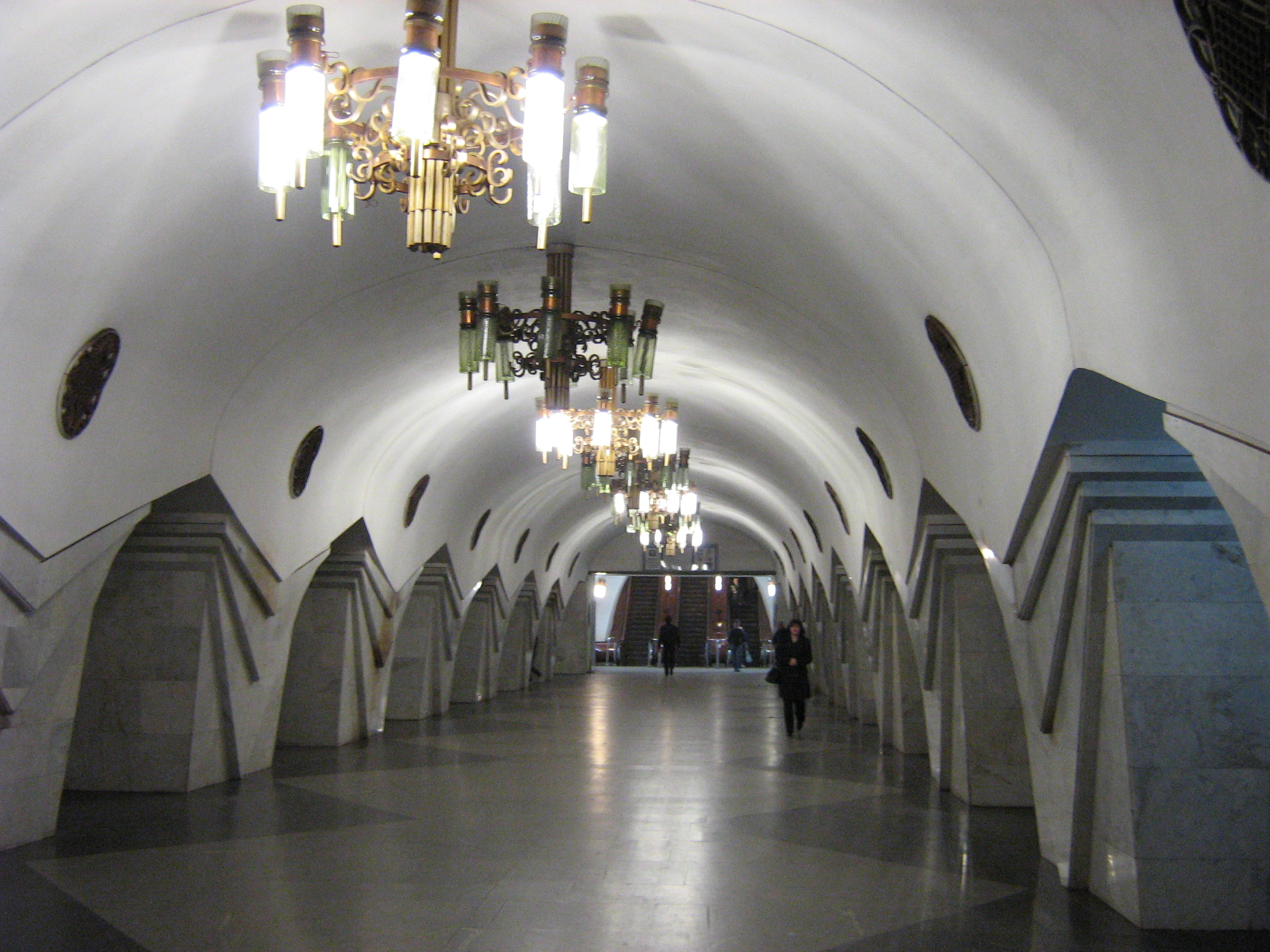
- The Station Hall

General information
- Coordinates: 50°0′14.16″N 36°14′51.08″E
- System: Kharkiv Metro Station
- Owner: Kharkiv Metro
- Line: Saltivska Line
- Platforms: 1
- Tracks: 2

Construction
- Structure type: underground
- Platform levels: 1

History
- Opened: 10 August 1984

Services
| Preceding station | Kharkiv Metro | Following station |
|---|---|---|
| Universytet towards Istorychnyi Muzei | Saltivska Line | Kyivska towards Saltivska |
Location

Yaroslava Mudroho (Ukrainian: Ярослава Мудрого, lit. 'Yaroslav the Wise') is a station on the Kharkiv Metro's Saltivska Line. Construction on the station began on 16 April 1977, and it opened on 10 August 1984 as Pushkinska, making it the eighth station of the Saltivska Line. It is located in Kharkiv's city center, beneath Yaroslava Mudroho Square at the intersection of the Yaroslava Mudroho and Hryhorii Skovoroda streets.

From its opening until 29 April 2024, the station was named after Russian poet Alexander Pushkin.

== Station ==
The metro station lies more than 30 metres (98 ft) underground which makes it the deepest station of the Kharkiv Metro system.

The station was opened on 10 August 1984 as "Pushkinska" under a street named after Russian poet Alexander Pushkin since 1899 (present-day Hryhoriia Skorovody street).

=== Renaming "Pushkinska" to "Yaroslava Mudroho" ===
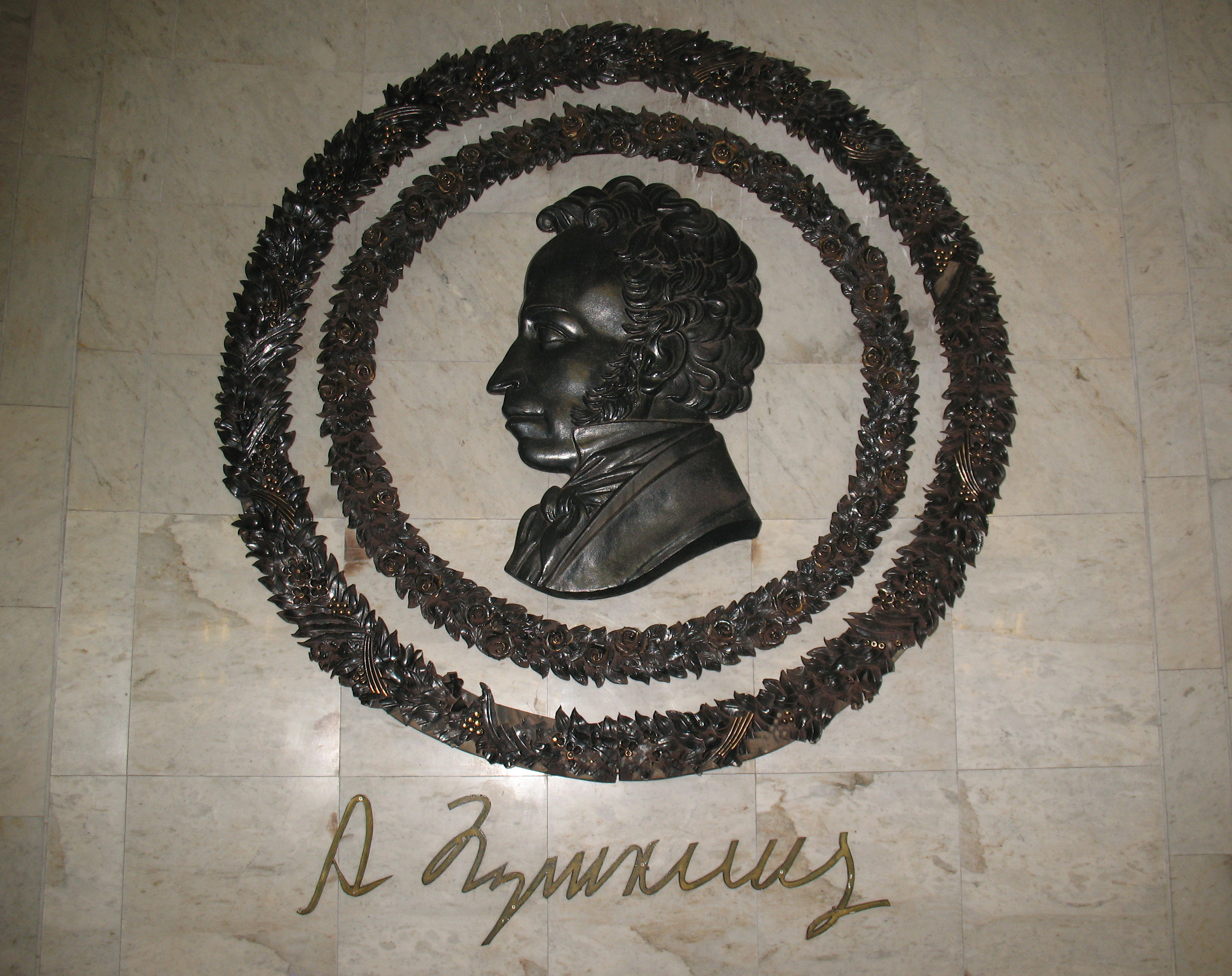
Bas-relief of Alexander Pushkin in the central hall of the station as photographed in 2010; the bas-relief was removed in January 2024

On 12 January 2024 a bas-relief of Alexander Pushkin was removed from the metro station and other artwork in the station that had incorporated poetry by Aleksandr Pushkin was also removed. As part of a derussification effort the previous year in Kharkiv a monument to Pushkin was dismantled, Pushkin’s name was removed from the name of the local drama theater, and all the murals with portraits of the poet were erased.

On 26 January 2024 the Kharkiv City Council renamed the Pushkinska street after which the metro station was named to Hryhorii Skovoroda street. The street was renamed in response to a 23 January 2024 Russian bombing of Kharkiv that caused nine victims, including a four-year-old child. In this attack the Pushkinska Street had been hit. According to Kharkiv Mayor Ihor Terekhov until the attack he "was in no hurry" to rename this street because "Like many Kharkiv residents, I always felt that Pushkin is not about modern Russia, not about the reality that the Putin regime is trying to instill by using the greatness of historical figures for his own benefit."

On 30 January 2024 Terekhov stated that in all toponyms in the city associated with Russia will be renamed within three to four months, including the metro station.

On 29 April 2024 Terekhov signed the order to rename the station Yaroslava Mudroho, commemorating the 11th century Grand Prince of Kyiv Yaroslav the Wise (Yaroslav Mudryi) whose name is also borne by the nearby Yaroslav Mudryi National Law University. On the same day, but before the station was officially renamed, the name Pushkinska was already removed from the station.
