= Kharkiv Metro Bridge =

Metro Bridge Харківський метроміст
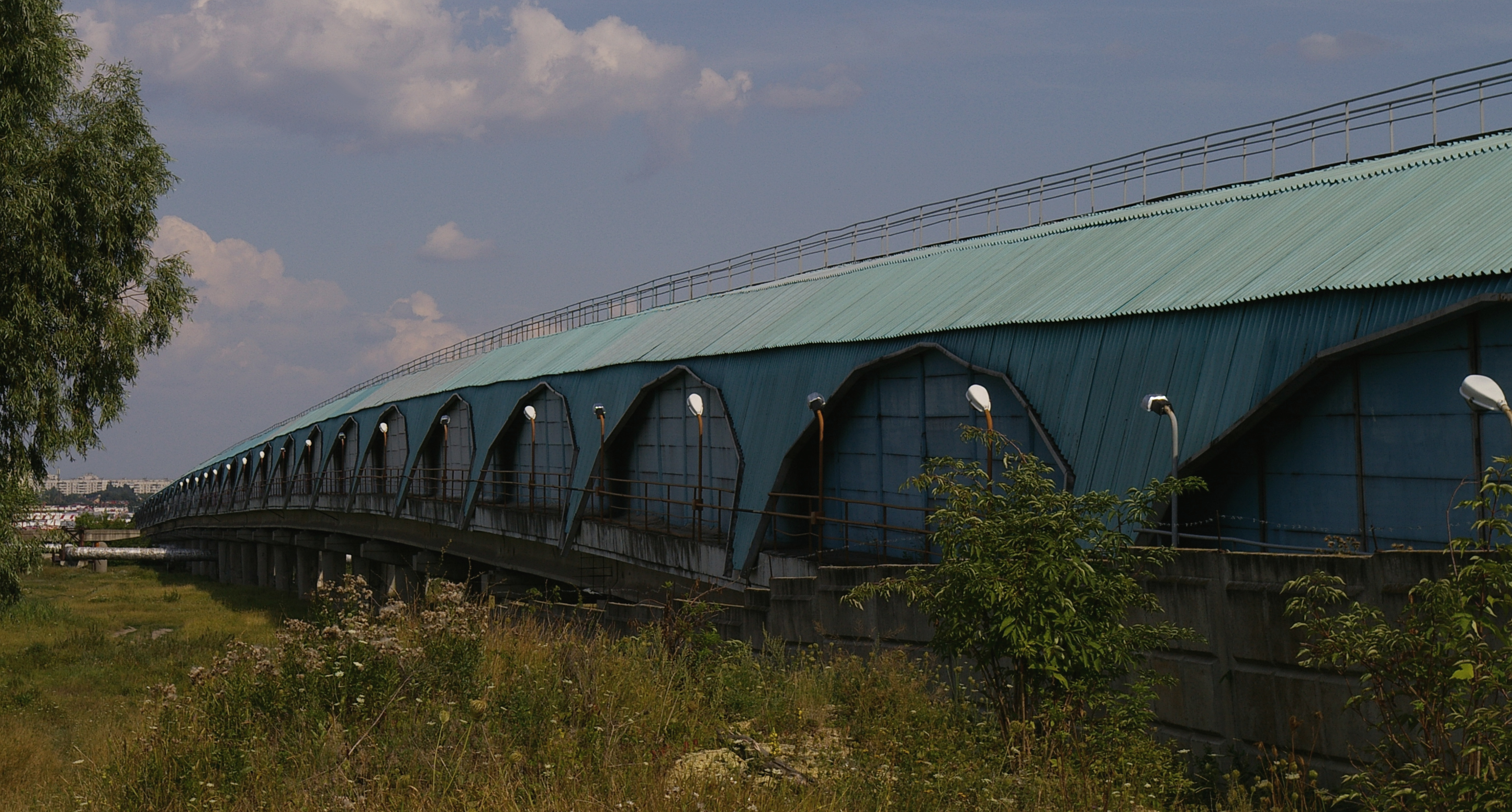
- The fully enclosed Kharkiv Metro Bridge.
- Coordinates: 50°00′06″N 36°16′59″E
- Carries: Saltivska Line, Kharkiv Metro
- Crosses: Kharkiv River
- Locale: Kharkiv, Ukraine

Characteristics
- Total length: 980 metres (3,220 ft)
- Longest span: 10 metres (33 ft)

History
- Opened: August 10, 1984

The Metro Bridge (Ukrainian: Харківський метроміст) is the only bridge of the Kharkiv Metro, located between the Kyivska and Akademika Barabashova stations on the Saltivska Line. The bridge crosses above the Kharkiv River and is fully enclosed without any windows to maintain the air flow. Its construction forced the demolition of a section of the Zhuravlivka private residential sector. Two pillars of a future road bridge were constructed, but this was halted due to the presence of Barbashova, the largest industrial goods market in Ukraine.

The bridge is closed to air and does not have windows to promote the function of its ventilation system. It was initially painted blue, however it was later painted green.
