= Akademika Pavlova (Kharkiv Metro) =

Kharkiv Metro station

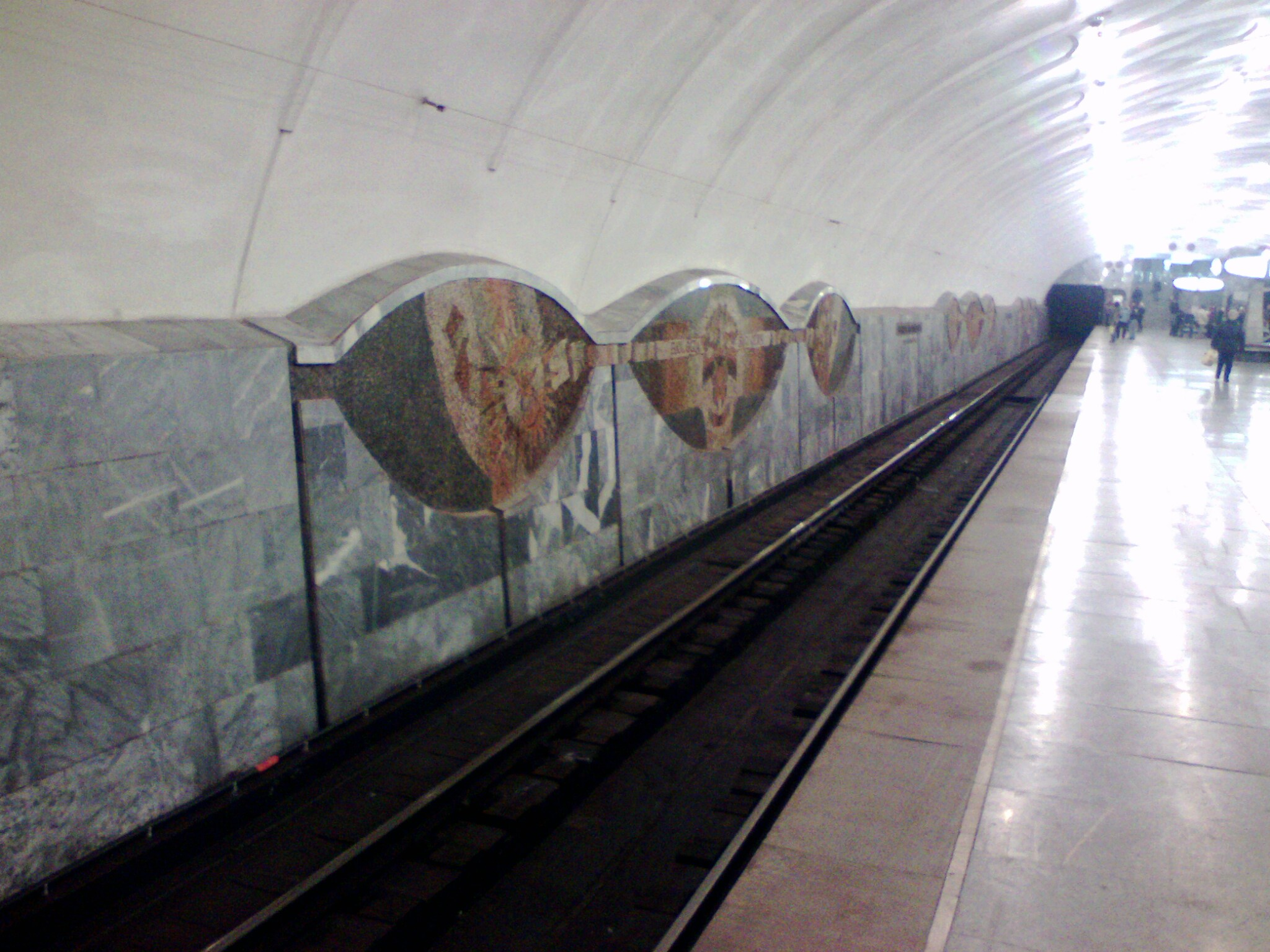

General information
- Coordinates: 50°0′33.37″N 36°19′6.62″E
- System: Kharkiv Metro Station
- Owner: Kharkiv Metro
- Line: Saltivska Line
- Platforms: 1
- Tracks: 2

Construction
- Structure type: underground
- Platform levels: 1

History
- Opened: 24 October 1986

Services
Preceding station	Kharkiv Metro	Following station
Akademika Barabashova towards Istorychnyi Muzei	Saltivska Line	Studentska towards Saltivska
Location

Akademika Pavlova (Ukrainian: Академіка Павлова,) is a station on the Kharkiv Metro's Saltivska Line. The station was opened on 24 October 1986.
