= Kyivska (Kharkiv Metro) =

Kharkiv Metro station

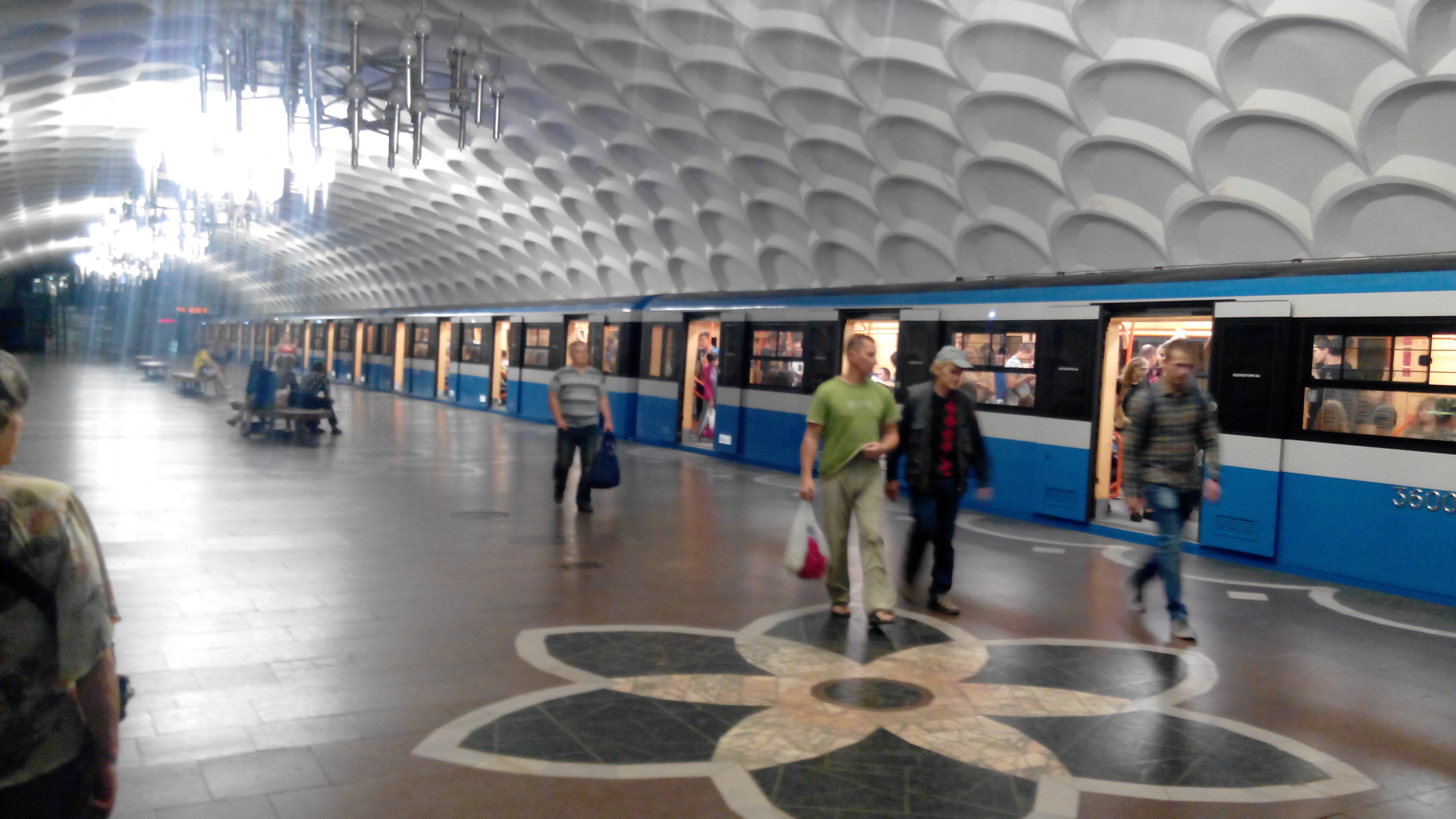

General information
- Coordinates: 50°0′4.15″N 36°16′12.87″E
- System: Kharkiv Metro Station
- Owner: Kharkiv Metro
- Line: Saltivska Line
- Platforms: 1
- Tracks: 2

Construction
- Structure type: underground
- Platform levels: 1

History
- Opened: 11 August 1984

Services
Preceding station	Kharkiv Metro	Following station
Yaroslava Mudroho towards Istorychnyi Muzei	Saltivska Line	Akademika Barabashova towards Saltivska
Location

Kyivska (Ukrainian: Київська,) is a station on the Kharkiv Metro's Saltivska Line. The station was opened on 11 August 1984.

The name of the metro station on the station's walls was originally written in Russian. In September 2023 the Russian letters were replaced with ones that depict the name of the station in Ukrainian as part of the derussification campaign following the Russian invasion of Ukraine. In addition, an image of the hammer and sickle, which is prohibited in Ukraine according to the 2015 Ukrainian decommunization laws, was removed from the walls.
