= Line 2 (Kharkiv Metro) =

Metro line in Ukraine

Saltivska line
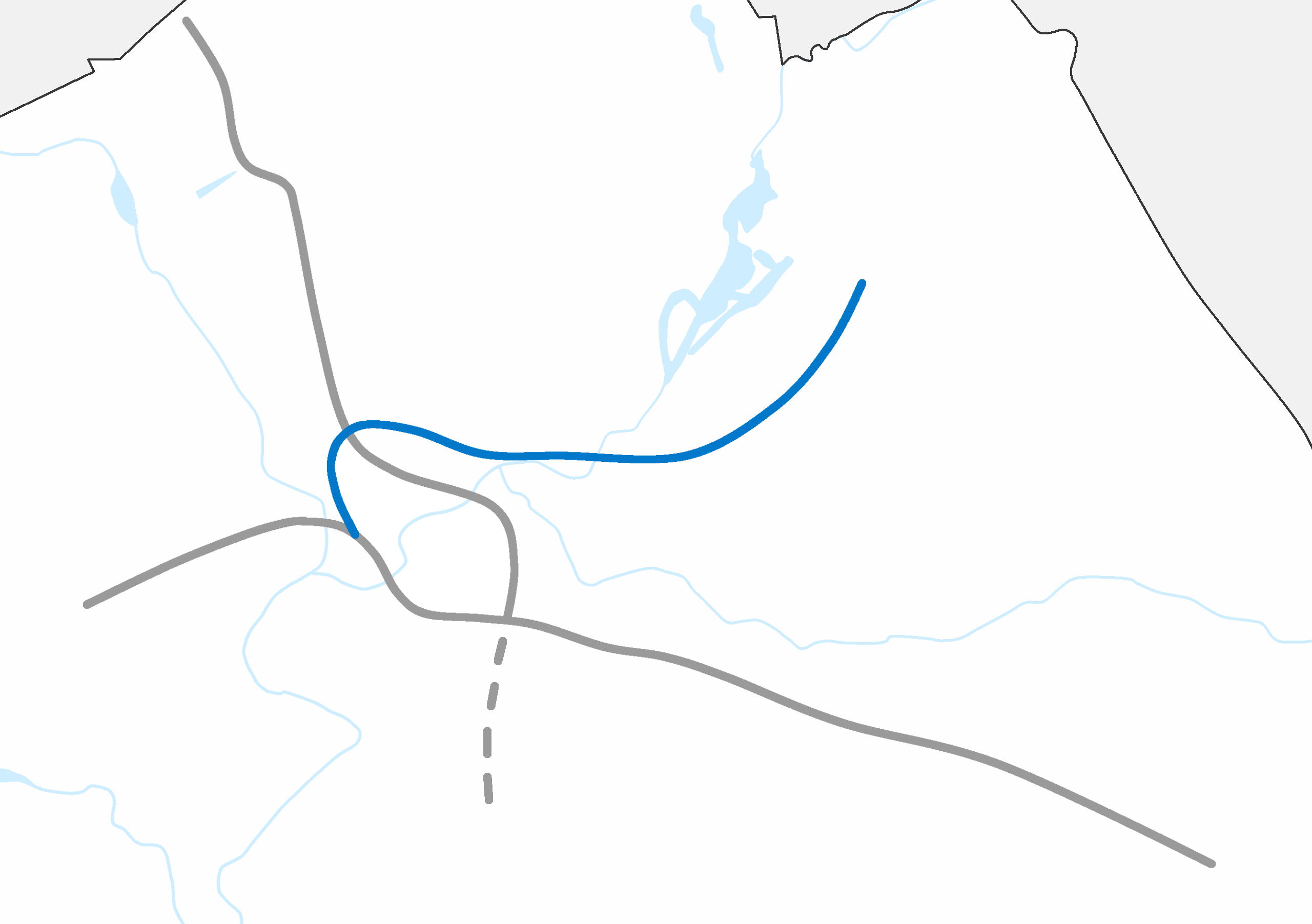

Overview
- Status: Operational
- Termini: Istorychnyi Muzei (southern); Saltivska (northern)
- Stations: 8

Service
- Type: Rapid transit
- System: Kharkiv Metro
- Operator: Kharkivskyi metropoliten
- Rolling stock: 81-717/714, 81-7036/7037
- Daily ridership: 380,250 (daily)

History
- Opened: 10 August 1984; 42 years ago
- Last extension: 1986

Technical
- Line length: 10.2 kilometres (6.3 mi)
- Track gauge: 5 ft (1,524 mm)

The Saltivska line (Ukrainian: Салтівська лінія; Russian: Салтовская линия) is the second line of the Kharkiv Metro operating since 1984, serving Kharkiv, the second largest city in Ukraine. The Saltivska Line is the shortest line segment of the system, at 10.2 kilometres (6.3 mi), with a total of eight stations. Unique to the Kharkiv Metro is the Saltivska line's metro bridge, which passes above the Kharkiv River between the Kyivska and Akademika Barabashova stations.

Geographically, the Saltivska line cuts Kharkiv on a northeast–southwest axis, and provides subway access to much of Saltivka (for which the line is named). It connects the city's largest residential neighborhood with the Constitution Square and Freedom Square in the city center. The Saltivska line is second behind the Kholodnohirsko–Zavodska Line with a daily ridership of 380,250 passengers. There are current proposals that would expand the Saltivska line to include an extra six stations and a split line segment, although these are only in the planning stage and they are not scheduled to start construction until the mid-2020s at the earliest.

== History ==
Since the late 1970s, an expansion of the Kharkiv Metro system was planned towards the then newly developed Saltivka neighborhood, located away from the industrial neighborhoods of the city. Accordingly, on April 9, 1976, the Soviet government adopted a plan to construct a second line on the Kharkiv Metro. Owing to the hilly city landscape towards the southwestern terminus of the Station, the line's first three stations are located deep underground, with the Yaroslava Mudroho station becoming the deepest station of the system at 30 metres (98 ft) underground. The rest of the stations on the line were built close to the surface, due to their proximity to the Kharkiv River. Construction on the line's second segment began in 1981, continuing on until the last three stations (all located within the confines of the Saltivka neighborhood) were opened on October 24, 1986.

=== Timeline ===
| Segment | Date opened | Stations | Length (Note: Approximate length, includes only operational passenger track length, does not include service track length.) |
|---|---|---|---|
| Istorychnyi Muzei—Akademika Barabashova | August 10, 1984 | 5 | 6.7 km |
| Akademika Pavlova—Saltivska | October 24, 1986 | 3 | 3.6 km |
| Total: | | 8 stations | 10.2 km |

=== Name changes ===
Following the fall of the Soviet Union in 1991 and the subsequent Ukrainian independence, some of the stations were renamed to more neutral equivalents, sometimes avoiding reference to significant Soviet institutions and their leaders. In addition, the station named after Russian poet Alexander Pushkin was renamed in 2024 to comply with the law "On the Condemnation and Prohibition of Propaganda of Russian Imperial Policy in Ukraine and the Decolonization of Toponymy".

- Dzerzhynska (1984–1993) → Universytet, named after the University of Kharkiv
- Barabashova (1984–2003) → Akademika Barabashova
- Pushkinska (1984–2024) → Yaroslava Mudroho, named after Grand Prince of Kiev Yaroslav the Wise
- Heroiv Pratsi (1975–2024) → Saltivska, named after the Saltivka neighborhood

== Stations ==
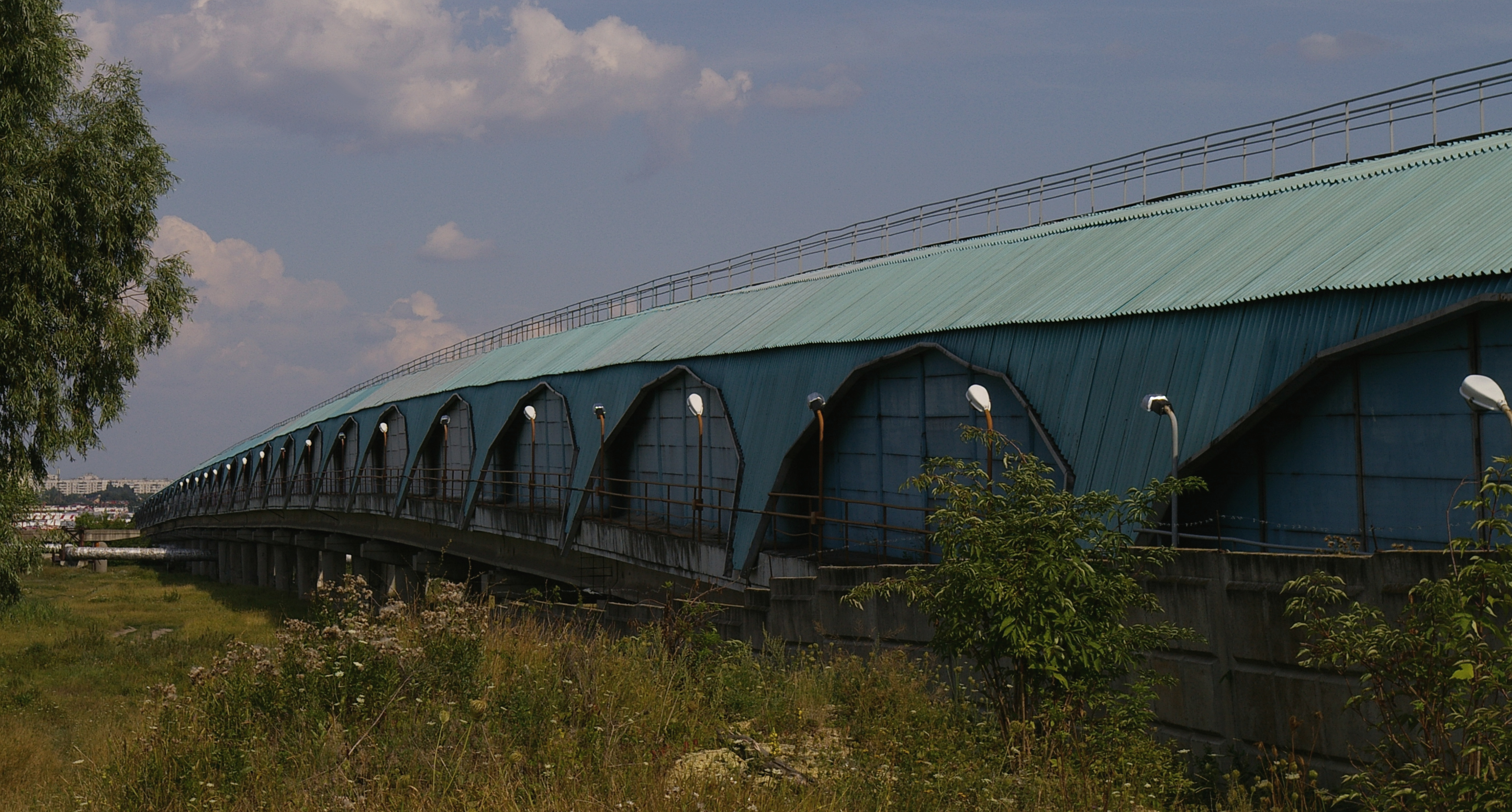
Kharkiv's only metro bridge, passing above the Kharkiv River, is fully enclosed to maintain the ventilation and air flow in the system.

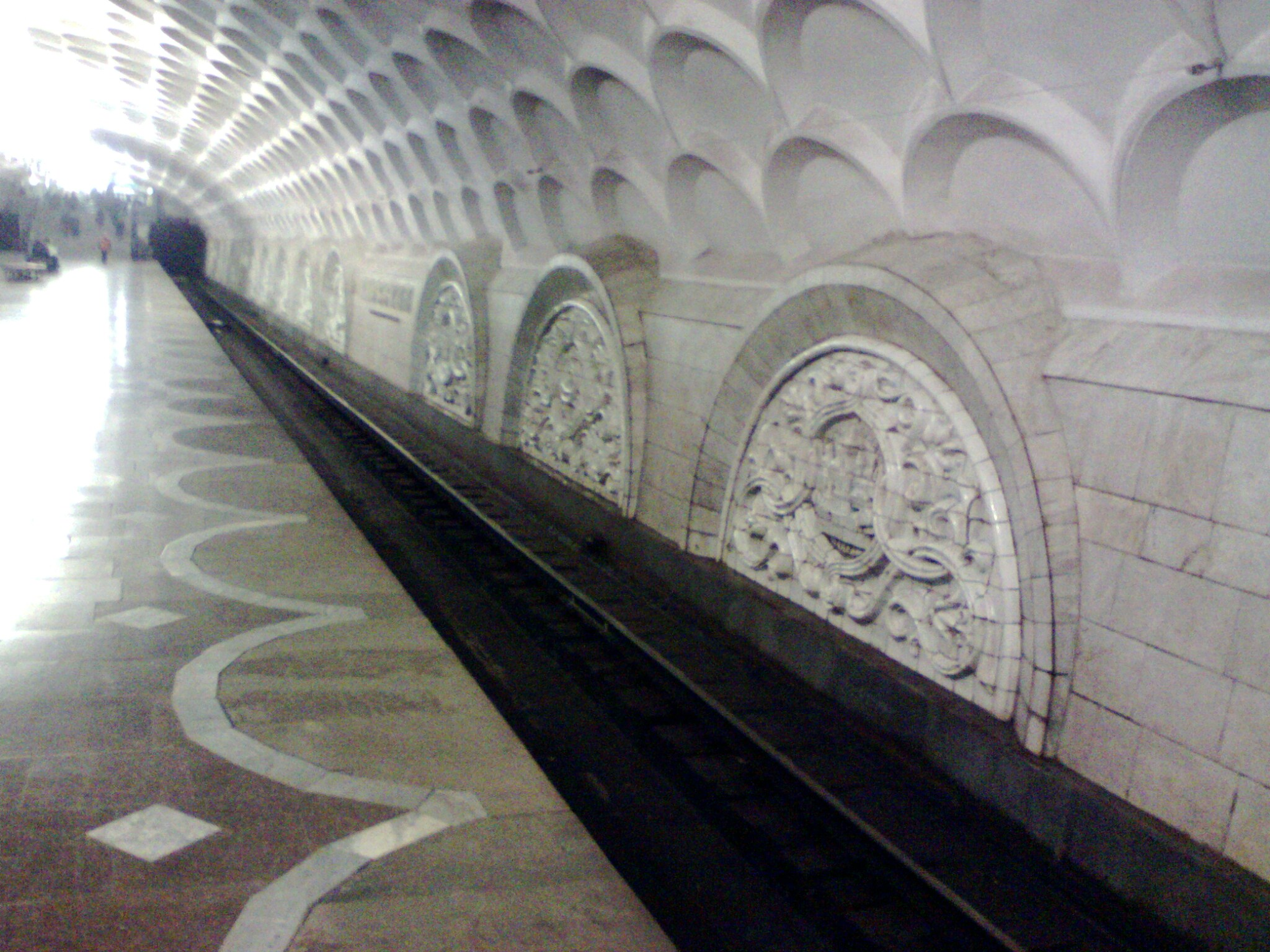
The Kyivska station features bas-relief designs decorated with Kyivan themes.

=== Transfers ===
Following the traditional Soviet metro planning, the second line (Saltivska line) is crossed by two other line segments at high traffic locations. Currently, the Saltivska line's two transfer stations with the Kholodnohirsko–Zavodska line (red line) and the Oleksiivska line (green line) are located in the southwestern part of the line. Specifically, the Saltivska line has two transfer stations:

| # | Transfer to | At | Opened |
|---|---|---|---|
| | Maidan Konstytutsii (Kholodnohirsko–Zavodska line) | Istorychnyi Muzei | August 10, 1984 |
| | Derzhprom (Oleksiivska line) | Universytet | May 6, 1995 |

== Technical specifications ==
Just like with the Kyiv Metro, government planning agencies allowed for a maximum of five carriage trains that would fit on the 100 metres (330 ft) station platforms without any modification to the station structure. Specifically, 20 five-carriage trains are assigned to serve the Saltivska line. The Saltivska line is the first in the system to use the 81-714/717 wagon models that have become the most widespread in the former USSR and Eastern Europe. It is serviced by the Depot-2 "Saltivske", located immediately after the metro bridge.

== Future extension ==
Since its latest extension in 1986, the Saltivska line is the third in the system in terms of length. It has a total of eight stations in operation, although a further four are in the early planning stages: the Druzhby Narodiv station is planned northwards from the line's current terminus Saltivska; eastwards from the Akademika Barabashova station, a three station segment is planned; as well as a southwestern extension at the other end of the Saltivska line at Ploshcha Urytskoho and Zhovtneva, respectively. However, these planned additions would be in the long-term perspective at least, considering that no official initiative to begin the construction at either ends was outlined in the "Oblast Program of Construction and the Expansion of the Kharkiv Metropoliten, 2007–2012."
