= Akademika Barabashova (Kharkiv Metro) =

Kharkiv Metro station

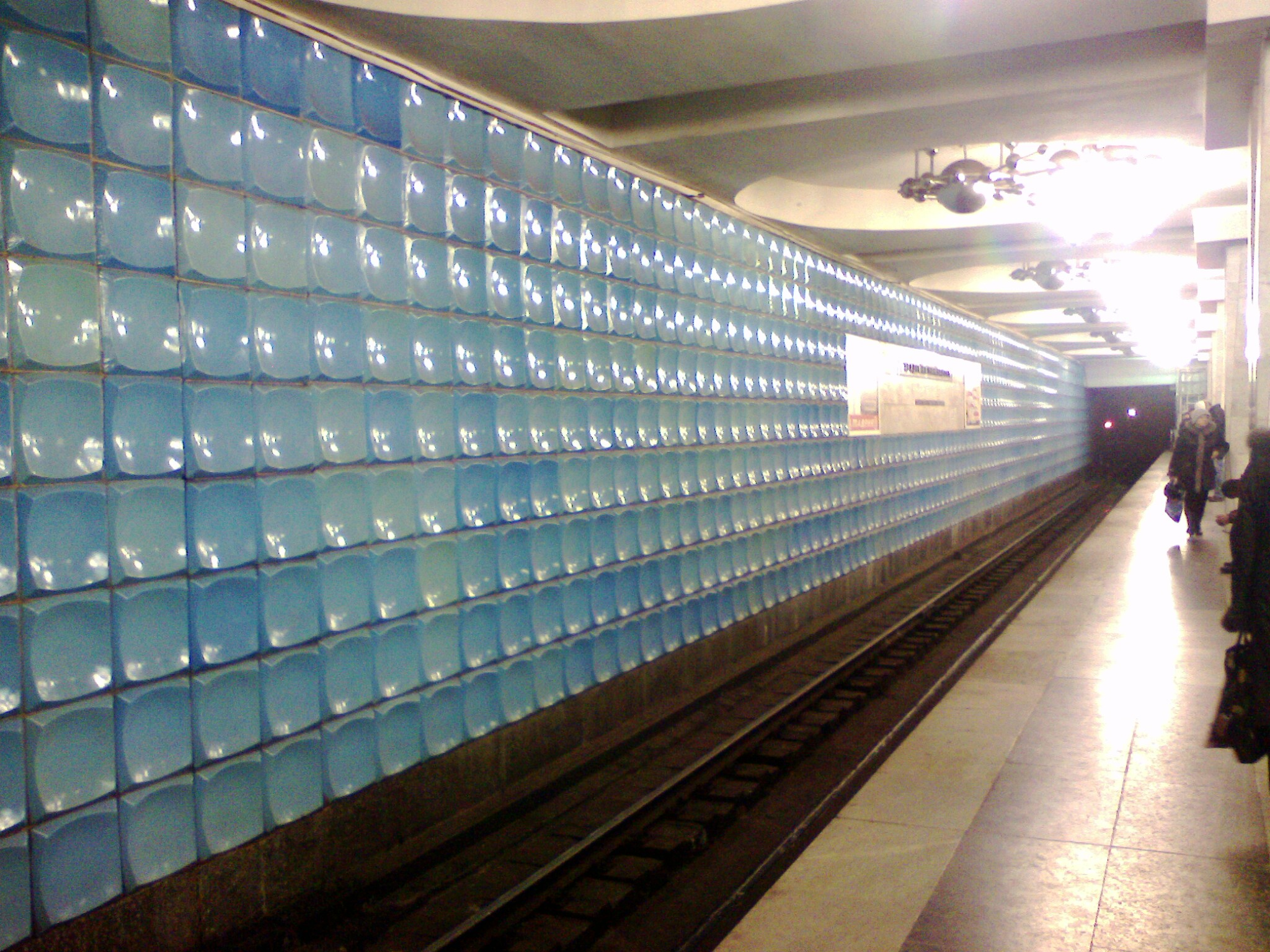

General information
- Coordinates: 50°0′7.75″N 36°18′10.3″E
- System: Kharkiv Metro Station
- Owner: Kharkiv Metro
- Line: Saltivska Line
- Platforms: 1
- Tracks: 2

Construction
- Structure type: underground
- Platform levels: 1

History
- Opened: 11 August 1984

Services
| Preceding station | Kharkiv Metro | Following station |
|---|---|---|
| Kyivska towards Istorychnyi Muzei | Saltivska Line | Akademika Pavlova towards Saltivska |
Location

Akademika Barabashova (Ukrainian: Академіка Барабашова,) is a station on the Kharkiv Metro's Saltivska Line. The station was opened on 11 August 1984. It is named after Soviet Ukrainian astronomer Nikolai Barabashov.
