= Saltivska (Kharkiv Metro) =

Kharkiv Metro station

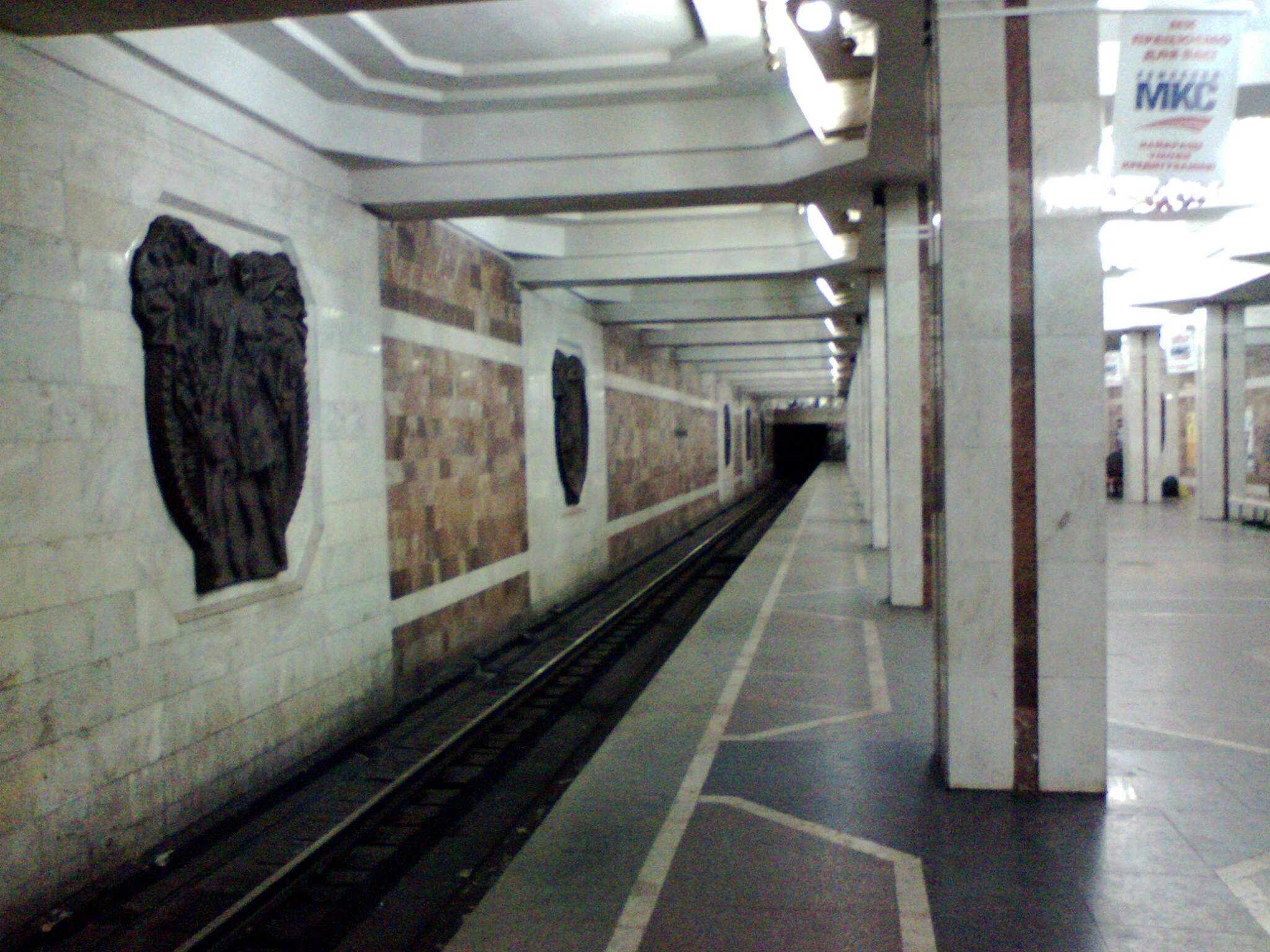

General information
- Coordinates: 50°1′28.77″N 36°20′9.07″E
- System: Kharkiv Metro Station
- Owner: Kharkiv Metro
- Line: Saltivska Line
- Platforms: 1
- Tracks: 2

Construction
- Structure type: underground
- Platform levels: 1

History
- Opened: 24 October 1986

Services
Preceding station	Kharkiv Metro	Following station
Studentska towards Istorychnyi Muzei	Saltivska Line	Terminus
Location

Saltivska (Ukrainian: Салтівська) is a station on the Kharkiv Metro's Saltivska Line. The station was opened on 24 October 1986.

Originally known as Heroiv Pratsi (Ukrainian: Героїв Праці, lit. 'Heroes of Labor'), the station was renamed to Saltivska on 26 July 2024, as part of efforts towards decommunization and derussification.
