= List of Kharkiv Metro stations =

Map of the Kharkiv Metro

The Kharkiv Metro (Ukrainian: Харківське метро or Харківський метрополітен) is the rapid transit system that serves the city of Kharkiv, the second largest city in Ukraine. The metro was the second in Ukraine (after Kyiv) and the sixth in the USSR when it opened on 22–23 August, (Note: The official opening ceremony was held on 22 August, with the Metro system being opened to the general public on 23 August.) 1975. The metro consists of three lines that operate on 38.7 kilometres (24.0 mi) of the route and serve 30 stations. The system transported 223 million passengers in 2018 (up from 212.85 million in 2017).

== Stations ==
Current metro stations
Name	Name (in Ukrainian) (Note: Links to Ukrainian Wikipedia articles for each station.)	Photo	Line	Opened	Type	Named after	Refs
Kholodna Hora Vulytsia Sverdlova (1975-1995)	Холодна гора Вулиця Свердлова (1975-1995)		Kholodnohirsko–Zavodska	23 August 1975	Shallow column	Kholodna Hora neighborhood	
Vokzalna Pivdennyi Vokzal (1975-2024)	Вокзальна; Південний вокзал (1975-2024)		Kholodnohirsko–Zavodska	23 August 1975	Pylon	Railway station	
Tsentralnyi Rynok	Центральний ринок		Kholodnohirsko–Zavodska	23 August 1975	Single-vault	Central Market	
Maidan Konstytutsii (Note: Transfer to Line 2 at Istorychnyi Muzei) Radianska (1975-2015)	Майдан Конституції; Радянська (1975-2015)		Kholodnohirsko–Zavodska	23 August 1975	Pylon	Constitution Square	
Levada Prospekt Haharina (1975-2024)	Левада; Проспект Гагарина (1975-2024)		Kholodnohirsko–Zavodska	23 August 1975	Shallow column	Kharkiv-Levada railway station	
Sportyvna (Note: Transfer to Line 3 at Metrobudivnykiv)	Спортивна		Kholodnohirsko–Zavodska	23 August 1975	Single-vault	Sport, due to proximity to the Metalist Oblast Sports Complex	
Zavodska Zavod Imeni Malysheva (1975-2024)	Заводська; Завод Імені Малишева (1975-2024)		Kholodnohirsko–Zavodska	23 August 1975	Shallow column	Malyshev Factory	
Turboatom Moskovskyi Prospekt (1975-2019)	Турбоатом; Московський проспект (1975-2019)		Kholodnohirsko–Zavodska	23 August 1975	Shallow column	Turboatom	
Palats Sportu Komsomolska (1978-1994) Marshala Zhukova (1994-2016)	Палац Спорту; Комсомольска (1978-1994); Маршала Жукова (1994-2016)		Kholodnohirsko–Zavodska	11 August 1978	Shallow column	Palace of Sports	
Armiiska Radianskoii Armii (1978-2016)	Армійська; Радянської армії (1978-2016)		Kholodnohirsko–Zavodska	11 August 1978	Single-vault	Army	
Imeni O. S. Maselskoho Industrialna (1978-2004)	Імені О.С. Масельського; Індустріальна (1978-2004)		Kholodnohirsko–Zavodska	11 August 1978	Shallow column	Oleksandr Maselsky, the first governor of Kharkiv Oblast	
Traktornyi Zavod	Тракторний завод		Kholodnohirsko–Zavodska	11 August 1978	Single-vault	Kharkiv Tractor Plant	
Industrialna Proletarska (1978-2016)	Індустріальна; Пролетарська (1978-2016)		Kholodnohirsko–Zavodska	11 August 1978	Shallow column	Industry	
Saltivska Heroiv Pratsi (1986-2024)	Салтівська; Героїв праці (1986-2024)		Saltivska	26 October 1986	Shallow column	Saltivka neighborhood	
Studentska	Студентська		Saltivska	26 October 1986	Shallow column	Students	
Akademika Pavlova	Академіка Павлова		Saltivska	26 October 1986	Single-vault	Ivan Pavlov, a physiologist	
Akademika Barabashova Barabashova (1984-2003)	Академіка Барабашова; Барабашова (1984-2003)		Saltivska	11 August 1984	Shallow column	Nikolai Barabashov, an astronomer from Kharkiv	
Kyivska	Київська		Saltivska	11 August 1984	Single-vault	Kyiv	
Yaroslava Mudroho Pushkinska (1984-2024)	Ярослава Мудрого; Пушкінська (1984-2024)		Saltivska	11 August 1984	Pylon	Yaroslav the Wise, the Grand Prince of Kiev	
Universytet (Note: Transfer to Line 3 at Derzhprom) Dzerzhynska (1984-1991)	Університет; Дзержинська (1984-1991)		Saltivska	11 August 1984	Shallow column	University	
Istorychnyi Muzei (Note: Transfer to Line 1 at Maidan Konstytutsii)	Історичний музей		Saltivska	11 August 1984	Deep column	Historical Museum	
Peremoha	Перемога		Oleksiivska	19 August 2016	Shallow column	Victory	
Oleksiivska	Олексіївська		Oleksiivska	21 December 2010	Shallow column	Oleksiivka neighborhood	
23 Serpnia	23 Серпня		Oleksiivska	21 August 2004	Shallow column	23 August, the day of liberation of Kharkiv during World War II	
Botanichnyi Sad	Ботанічний сад		Oleksiivska	21 August 2004	Shallow column	Botanical garden	
Naukova	Наукова		Oleksiivska	6 May 1995	Shallow column	Nauky (Science) Avenue	
Derzhprom (Note: Transfer to Line 2 at Universytet)	Держпром		Oleksiivska	6 May 1995	Pylon	Derzhprom building	
Arkhitektora Beketova	Архітектора Бекетова		Oleksiivska	6 May 1995	Pylon	Oleksiy Beketov, an architect from Kharkiv	
Zakhysnykiv Ukrainy Ploshcha Povstannia (1995-2016)	Захисників України; Площа Повстання (1995-2016)		Oleksiivska	6 May 1995	Shallow column	Zakhysnykiv Ukrainy (Defenders of Ukraine) Square	
Metrobudivnykiv (Note: Transfer to Line 1 at Sportyvna)	Метробудівників		Oleksiivska	6 May 1995	Shallow column	Metro builders	

=== Future stations ===
Station	Name (in Ukrainian)	Line	Status	Type	Named after	Refs
Derzhavinska	Державінська	Oleksiivska	Preparation for construction	Shallow column		
Odeska	Одеська	Oleksiivska	Preparation for construction	Shallow column	Odesa	

== See also ==
- List of Kyiv Metro stations
- List of Dnipro Metro stations
