= Istorychnyi Muzei (Kharkiv Metro) =

Kharkiv Metro station

Istorychnyi Myzei

General information
- Coordinates: 49°59′35″N 36°13′49″E
- System: Kharkiv Metro Station
- Owner: Kharkiv Metro
- Line: Saltivska Line
- Platforms: 1
- Tracks: 2

Construction
- Structure type: underground
- Platform levels: 1

History
- Opened: 10 August 1984

Services
Preceding station	Kharkiv Metro	Following station
Terminus	Saltivska Line	Universytet towards Saltivska
Tsentralnyi Rynok towards Kholodna Hora	Kholodnohirsko-Zavodska Line transfer at Maidan Konstytutsii	Levada towards Industrialna
Location

Istorychnyi Muzei (Ukrainian: Історичний музей,; lit. 'Historical Museum') is a station on the Kharkiv Metro's Saltivska Line. The station was opened on 10 August 1984 and is currently the southwesternmost terminus of the Saltivska Line. It is located beneath the Maidan Konstytutsii, literally Constitution square in the historical part of Kharkiv, and is named for the historical museum which is located on the square.

The station, inspired by the history of Kharkiv, has shaped columns and a relief-type ceiling in the station vestibule which give the feeling of the protected fort, which stood at this location during the 17th and 18th centuries. Also, the arrow-shaped arcs between the columns are reminiscent of fort gates. The columns are finished in a light colored marble Koelga and the tunnel walls are finished with brown marble and heraldic items made from bronze, which provide contrast. The Istorychniy Muzei station is located deep underground and is a pylon trivault and was designed by V.A. Spivachuk, P.G. Chechalnitskiy, and I.T. Karpenko; engineered by P.D. Pashkov, V.D. Shtuchkin, and L.P. Hryshyna; and was decorated by P.D. Chernova, V.E. Hutnik; I.I. Morgunov, O.Y. Erofeeva, V.V. Chursin, and V.D.Semenyuk.

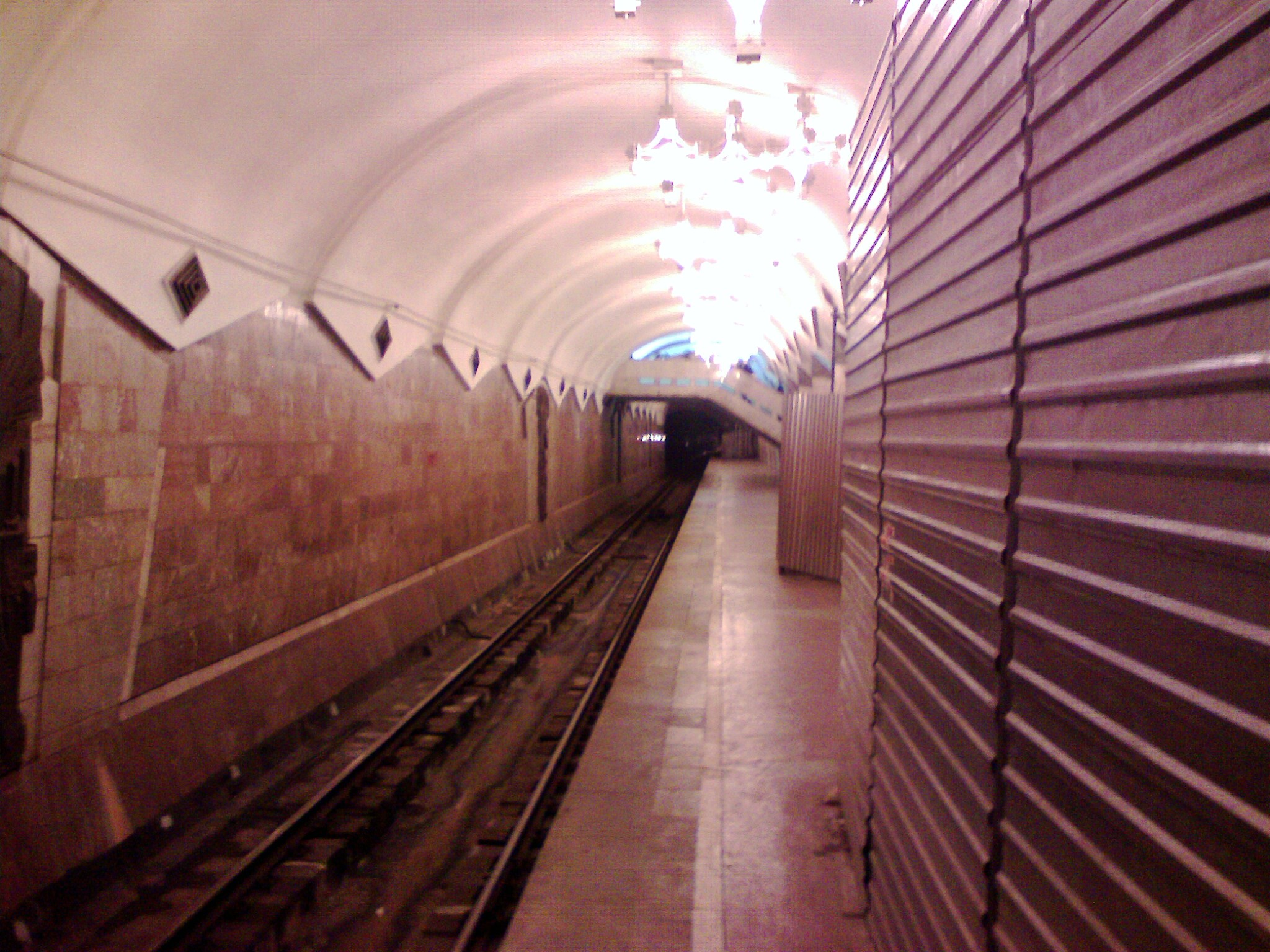
Station platform

Istorychniy Muzei forms a complex with the adjacent Maidan Konstytutsii station on the Kholodnohirsko-Zavodska Line. Transfer tunnels from one station to another are located in the centre of the station. Also, four escalators lead into a spacious underground vestibule which is located under the Constitution Square. The vestibule is connected with the underground passenger tunnel which leads onto the square, to the Sumska Street, the largest street in Kharkiv, to the Universytets`ka Street, and to the Bursatskyi Descent.

In 1985, during the finishing of the transfer tunnel between the Istorychniy Muzei and Maidan Konstytutsii stations, a closed-circuit television (CCTV) system was installed, the first in the Kharkiv Metro. Currently, all stations on the system have CCTV. The installation of this system allowed the workers of the metro to keep passengers in order and maintain more effective control over the escalators.
