= Armiiska (Kharkiv Metro) =

Kharkiv Metro station

- The Station Hall

General information
- Coordinates: 49°57′41″N 36°20′37″E
- System: Kharkiv Metro Station
- Owner: Kharkiv Metro
- Line: Kholodnohirsko-Zavodska Line
- Platforms: 1
- Tracks: 2

Construction
- Structure type: underground
- Platform levels: 1

History
- Opened: 11 August 1978
- Former names: Radianskoii Armii

Services
Preceding station	Kharkiv Metro	Following station
Palats Sportu towards Kholodna Hora	Kholodnohirsko-Zavodska Line	Imeni O.S. Maselskoho towards Industrialna
Location

Armiiska (Ukrainian: Армійська,), formerly known as Radianskoii Armii (Ukrainian: Радянської армії, lit. 'Soviet Army'), is a station on the Kharkiv Metro's Kholodnohirsko–Zavodska Line. It opened on 11 August 1978.

On 17 May 2016, the station was renamed to conform with the law banning Communist names in Ukraine. In September 2023 Soviet red stars, until then still visible in the station's design, were replaced with images of a Ukrainian trident and the Coat of arms of Kharkiv.
