= Zavodska (Kharkiv Metro) =

Kharkiv Metro station

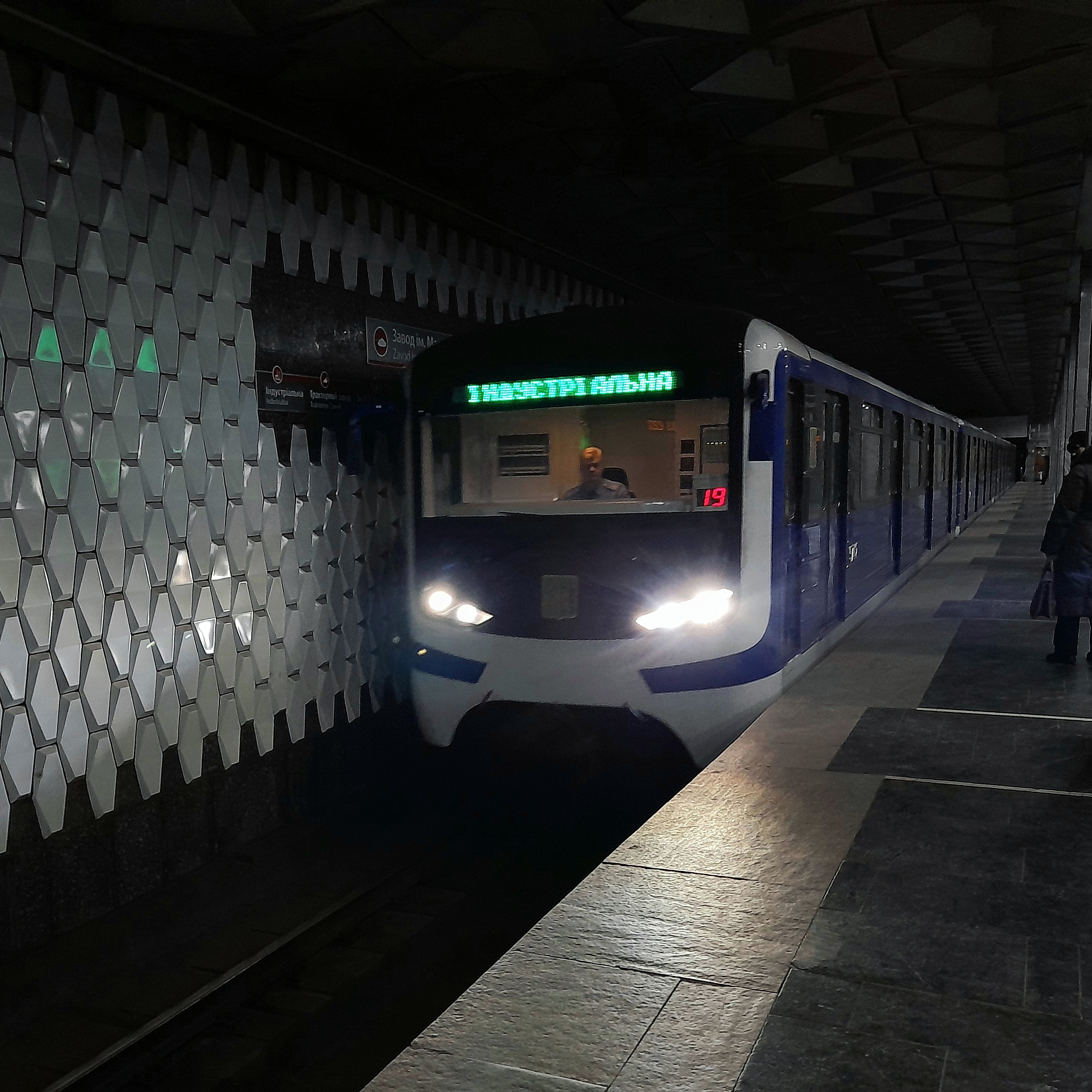
- A train (type 81-710.1) arriving at the station

General information
- Coordinates: 49°58′32.62″N 36°16′51.24″E
- System: Kharkiv Metro Station
- Owner: Kharkiv Metro
- Line: Kholodnohirsko-Zavodska Line
- Platforms: 1
- Tracks: 2

Construction
- Structure type: underground
- Platform levels: 1

History
- Opened: 23 August 1975

Services
| Preceding station | Kharkiv Metro | Following station |
|---|---|---|
| Sportyvna towards Kholodna Hora | Kholodnohirsko-Zavodska Line | Turboatom towards Industrialna |
Location

Zavodska (Ukrainian: Заводська) is a station on the Kharkiv Metro's Kholodnohirsko–Zavodska Line. It was opened on 23 August 1975.

The station is located close to the Malyshev Factory.

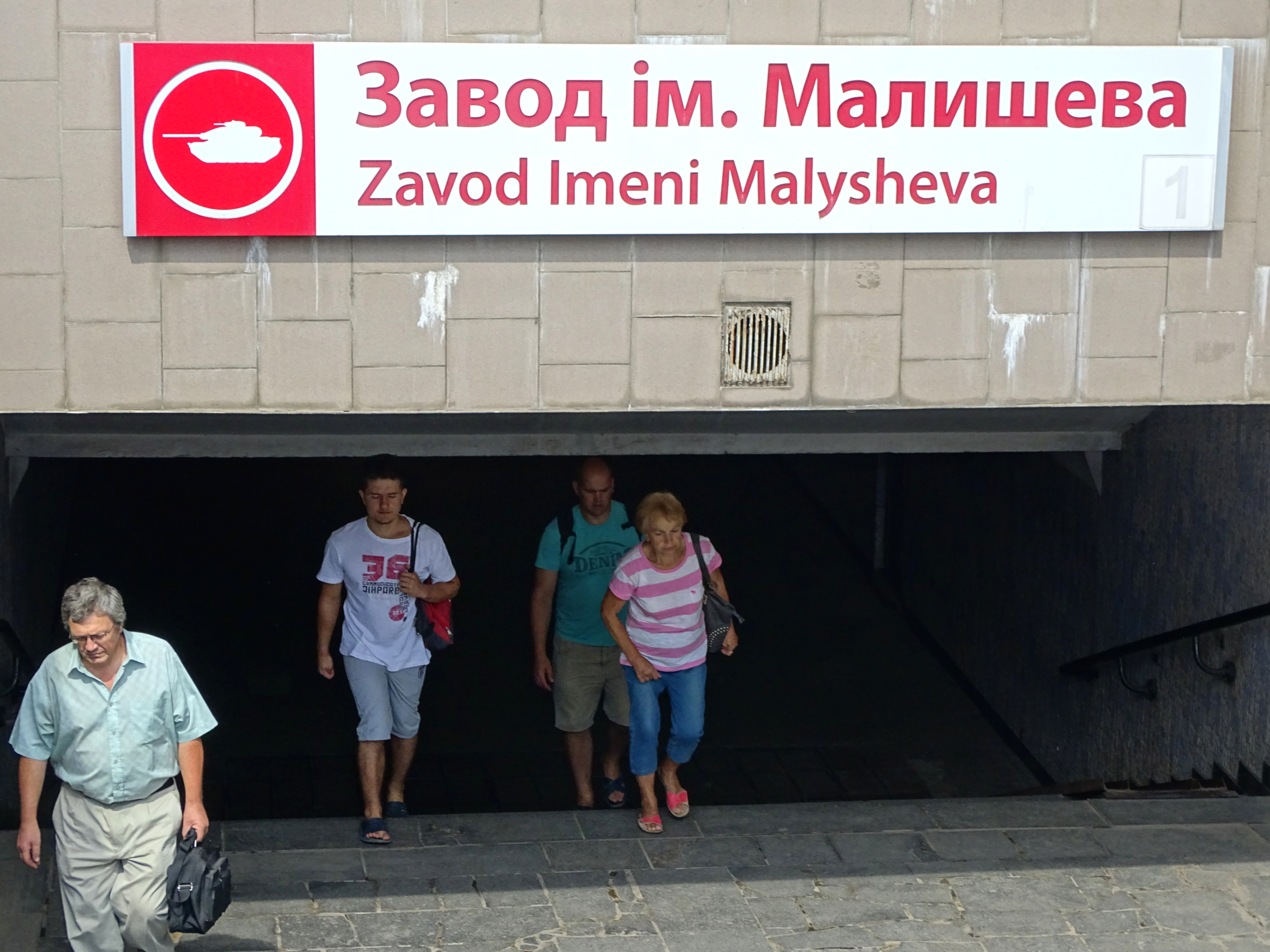
Station entrance

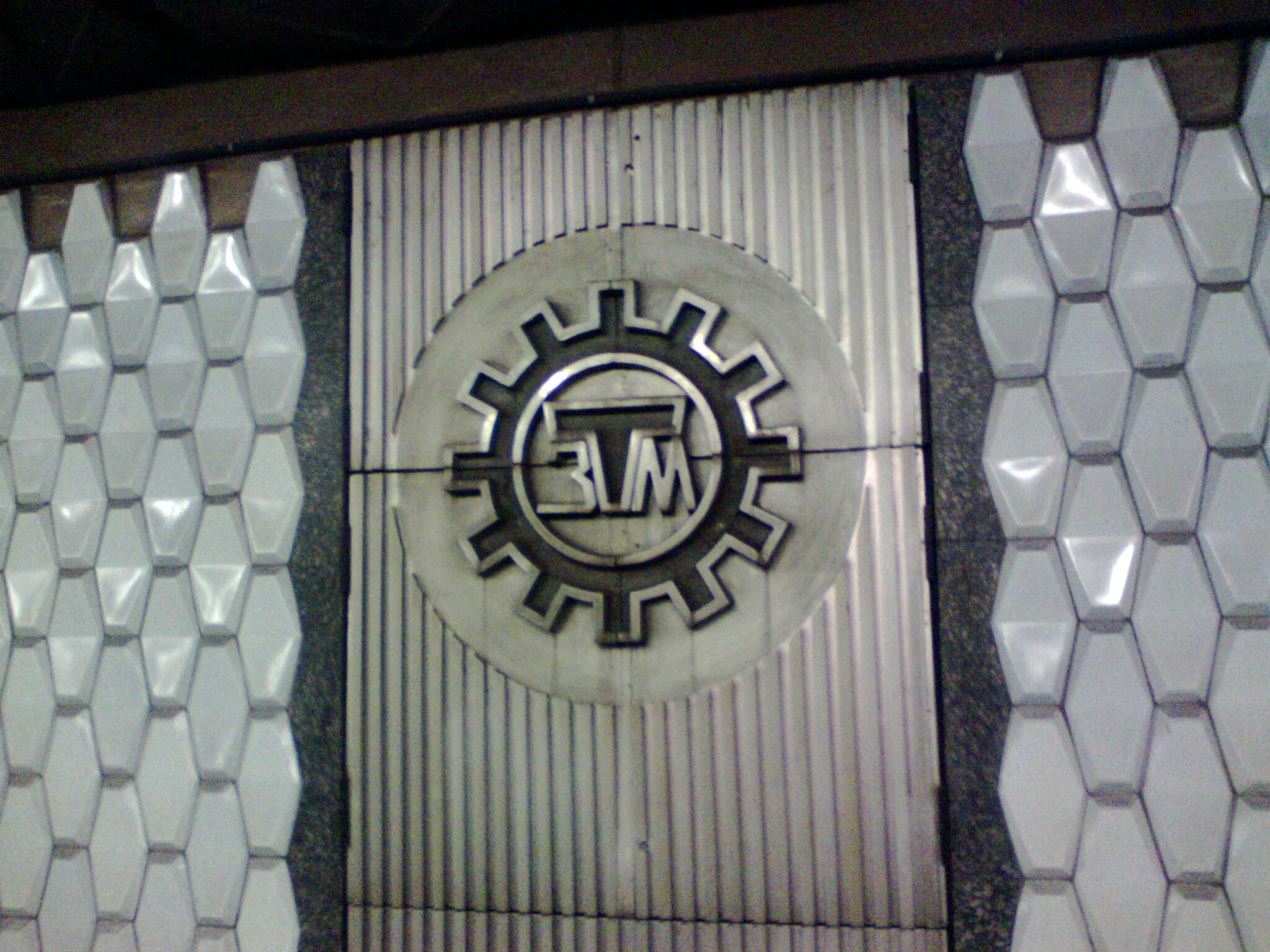
Malyshev Factory logo on the wall
