= Palats Sportu =

Palats Sportu (Ukrainian: Палац Спорту, pronounced [pɐˈlɑts ˈspɔrtʊ], lit. 'Palace of Sports') may refer to:

- Palace of Sports, Kharkiv
  - Palats Sportu (Kharkiv Metro)
- Palace of Sports, Kyiv
  - Palats Sportu (Kyiv Metro)
