= Sportyvna (Kharkiv Metro) =

Kharkiv Metro station

- The Station Hall

General information
- Coordinates: 49°58′46″N 36°15′39″E
- System: Kharkiv Metro Station
- Owner: Kharkiv Metro
- Line: Kholodnohirsko-Zavodska Line
- Platforms: 1
- Tracks: 2

Construction
- Structure type: underground
- Platform levels: 1

History
- Opened: 23 August 1975

Services
Preceding station	Kharkiv Metro	Following station
Levada towards Kholodna Hora	Kholodnohirsko-Zavodska Line	Zavodska towards Industrialna
Zakhysnykiv Ukrainy towards Peremoha	Oleksiivska Line transfer at Metrobudivnykiv	Terminus
Location

Sportyvna (Ukrainian: Спортивна,) or Sportivnaya (Russian: Спортивная) is a station on the Kharkiv Metro's Kholodnohirsko–Zavodska Line. It was opened on 23 August 1975. It is located in the southwestern part of the city's center, beneath the Plechanivska Vulytsia and the Derzhavinska Vulytsia junction. The station received its name from the word sport, due to the neighbouring FC Metalist Kharkiv Stadium, the biggest in Kharkiv. During the planning stage the station was to be called Stadion.

The station is lain shallow underground and is a single-vault design with a rounded ceiling. The ceiling is covered with 6,200 triangular, cement structures, each having a weight of about 100 kilograms. The lighting in the station comes from lamps hanging from the cement structures. The partitions the tracks have been held with are made of black natural stone and the floor has been paved with flags of polished red granite, into which zigzag patterns, made from light coloured stone, have been introduced near the end of the platform. Also, small black slates of marble from Uzbekistan line the railings of the stairs which lead into the station vestibule.

In 1995, the Sportivna station became a transfer station to Metrobudivnykiv on the Oleksiivska Line, with which it forms a complex. Stairs leading to the transfer tunnel are located in the center of the Sportyvna station platform.

Located not far from the station is one of Kharkiv's largest markets and the No.3 bus station, from which buses take directions around the city and to international directions, including the Kharkiv-Shebekino line.
