= Maidan Konstytutsii (Kharkiv Metro) =

Kharkiv Metro station

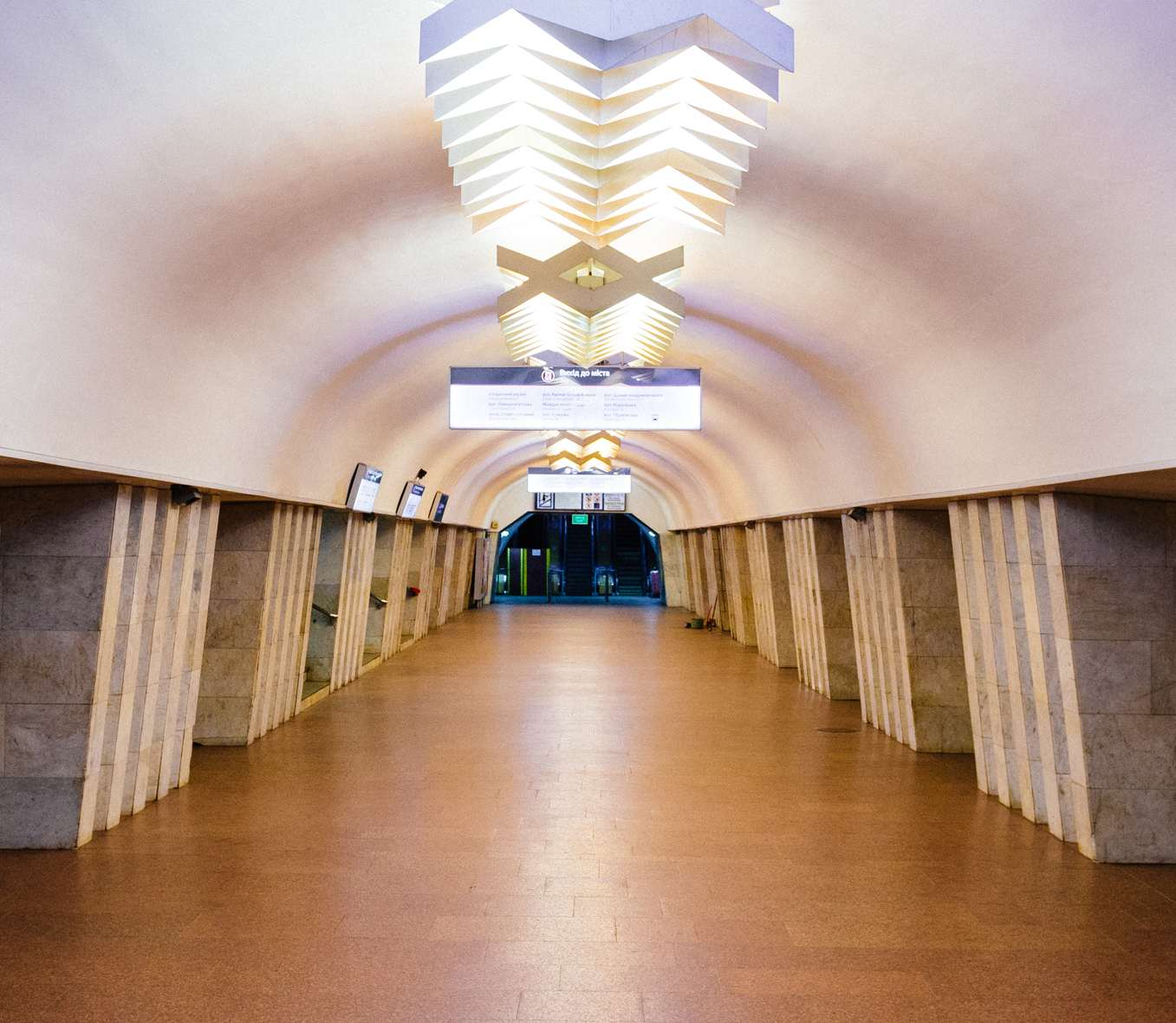
- Station hall

General information
- Coordinates: 49°59′29″N 36°13′57″E
- System: Kharkiv Metro station
- Owner: Kharkiv Metro
- Line: Kholodnohirsko-Zavodska Line
- Platforms: 1
- Tracks: 2

Construction
- Structure type: underground
- Depth: 20 m (66 ft)
- Platform levels: 1

History
- Opened: 23 August 1975

Services
Preceding station	Kharkiv Metro	Following station
Tsentralnyi Rynok towards Kholodna Hora	Kholodnohirsko-Zavodska Line	Levada towards Industrialna
Terminus	Saltivska Line transfer at Istorychnyi Muzei	Universytet towards Saltivska
Location

Maidan Konstytutsii (Ukrainian: Майдан Конституції, lit. 'Constitution Square') is a station on the Kharkiv Metro's Kholodnohirsko–Zavodska Line. The station was opened on 23 August 1975. It is located in the historical part of Kharkiv, beneath the Maidan Konstytutsii (Constitution square), previously known as Soviet Square.

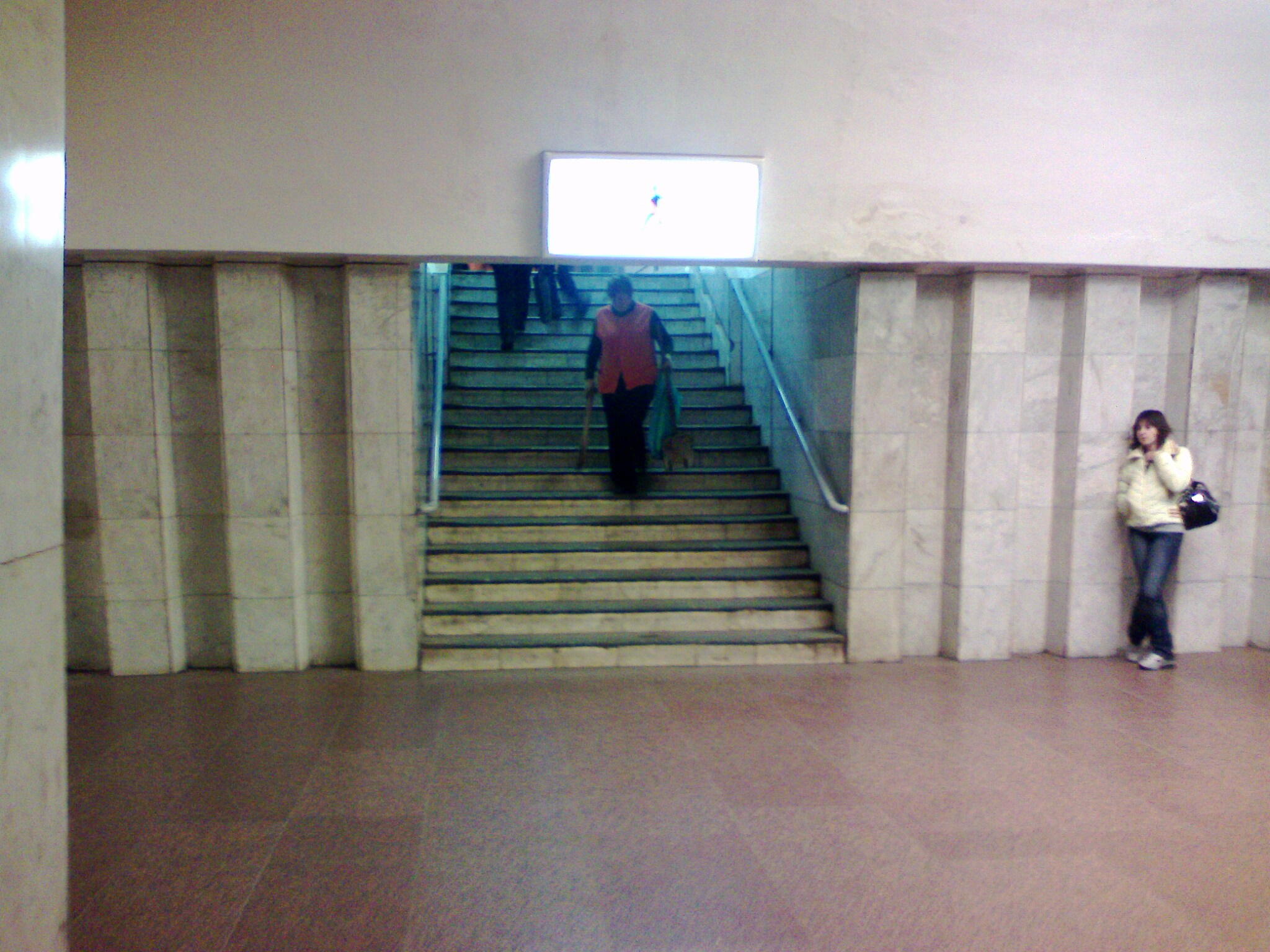
View of the transfer passage to the Istorychnyi Muzei station

The Maidan Konstytutsii station forms a complex with the adjacent station, Istorychnyi Muzei, on the Saltivska Line. Before the Istorychniy Muzei station's completion in 1984, a relief marble architectural item adorned with the hammer and sickle was located on the station. Inside the passenger transfer tunnel is the Kharkiv Metro's only public restroom, which is unlike the western European metro systems.

Early during the planning stage, the station was to be called Tsentr, literally Centre, and to be built in the vicinity of the Tsentralny Restaurant. But because of the hydro-geological circumstances in the area, also affecting the construction of neighbouring stations, the station was moved to the northern end of the Constitution Square.

Inside the cashier hall columns hold up the ceiling. They are made of marble blocks, the lower half being made of dark tones, gradually moving on into whiter tones. The station vestibule is lightened with luminescent lamps, put inside niches within the ceiling. The vestibule's area is 500 square meters, which is due to the high passenger traffic, caused by the station being a transfer to another station.

The Maidan Konstytutsii station is deep underground and is a pylon three-vaulted structure which is separated by arcades of the tracks. It was designed by V.A. Krasnolobov, N.P. Nikulin, and P.G. Chechelnitskiy; engineered by P.A. Bochikashvili, Y.E. Kryk and V.A. Tovalyuk; and decorated by D.G. Sova. The partitions the tracks have been held with are made of rose marble from Uzbekistan, and the arcades themselves have been finished with blank marble. The marble harmonizes with the floor which has been paved with red and black blocks of polished granite.

Until the end of 1985, the station hall was lighted with lights placed inside original geometrical forms. In the next year, the geometrical lamp forms were replaced by different metal forms. In connection with the 350th anniversary of Kharkiv in 2003, the stations, including Maidan Konstytutsii, were lightened with brighter lamps.

Until 20 November 2015, the station was named Radianska (in Russian, 'Sovetskaya'). On that day the Kharkiv City Council renamed the station to comply with decommunization laws.
