= Turboatom (Kharkiv Metro) =

Kharkiv Metro station

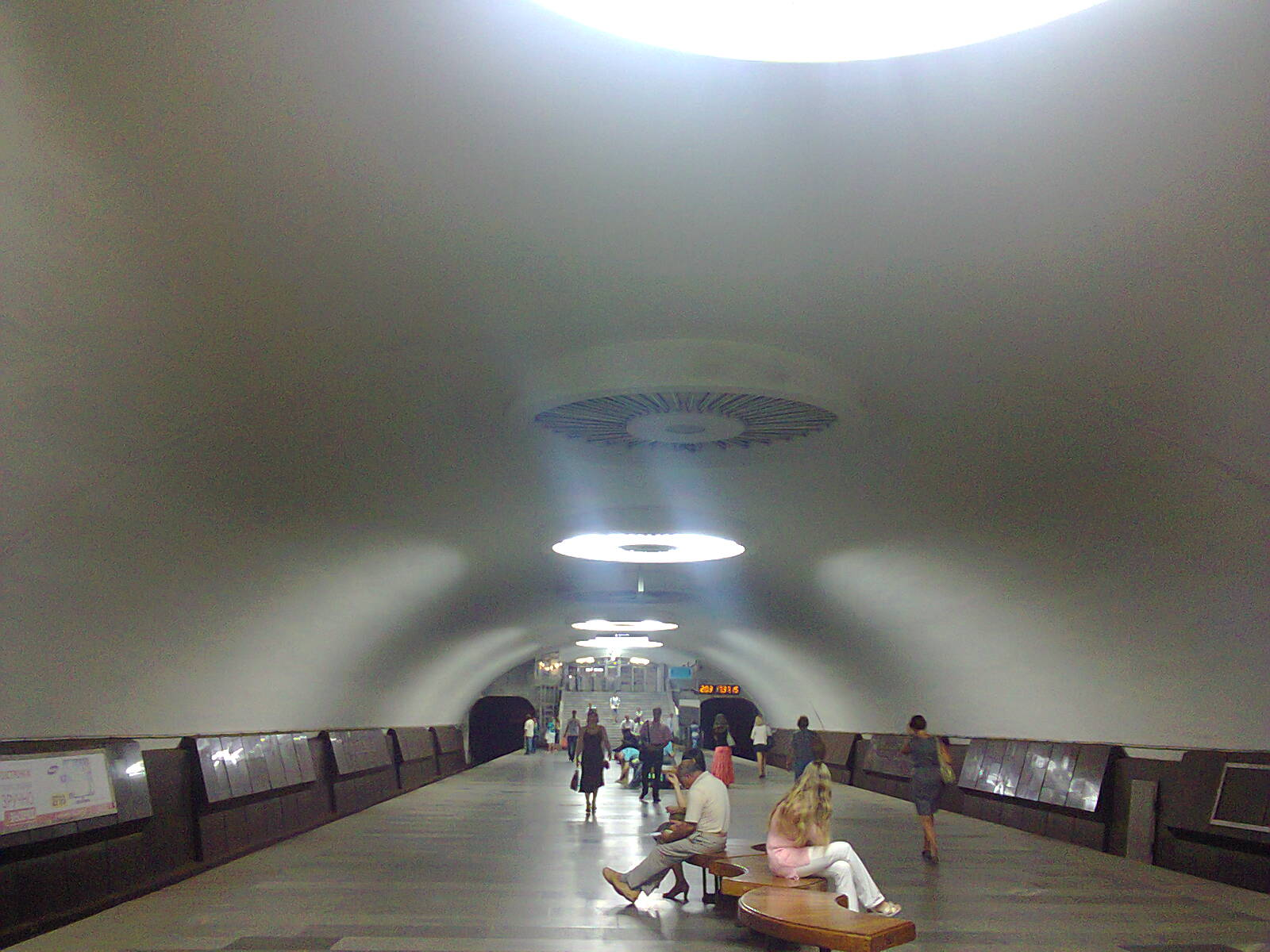
- The Station Hall

General information
- Location: Nemyshlianskyi District; Kharkiv; Ukraine
- Coordinates: 49°58′20″N 36°18′07″E
- System: Kharkiv Metro Station
- Owner: Kharkiv Metro
- Line: Kholodnohirsko-Zavodska Line
- Platforms: 1 island platform
- Tracks: 2
- Connections: Trolleybus: 13, 19, 20, 31, 35; Bus: 49э, 205э, 226э, 227э, 249э, 259э, 267э, 294э

Construction
- Structure type: underground
- Platform levels: 1

History
- Opened: 23 August 1975
- Former names: Moskovskyi Prospekt (until 2019)

Services
| Preceding station | Kharkiv Metro | Following station |
|---|---|---|
| Zavodska towards Kholodna Hora | Kholodnohirsko-Zavodska Line | Palats Sportu towards Industrialna |
Location

Turboatom (Ukrainian: Турбоатом,) is a station on the Kharkiv Metro's Kholodnohirsko–Zavodska Line. It was opened in 1975 as one of the first seven metro stations in Kharkiv. The station was the southern terminus of the line before 1978. It is located under the Heroiv Kharkova Avenue. Until October 2019, the station was named Moskovskyi Prospekt (Ukrainian: Московський проспект, lit. 'Moscow Avenue'). Mayor Hennadiy Kernes claimed it was renamed "to show respect for the staff" of the Turboatom enterprise.

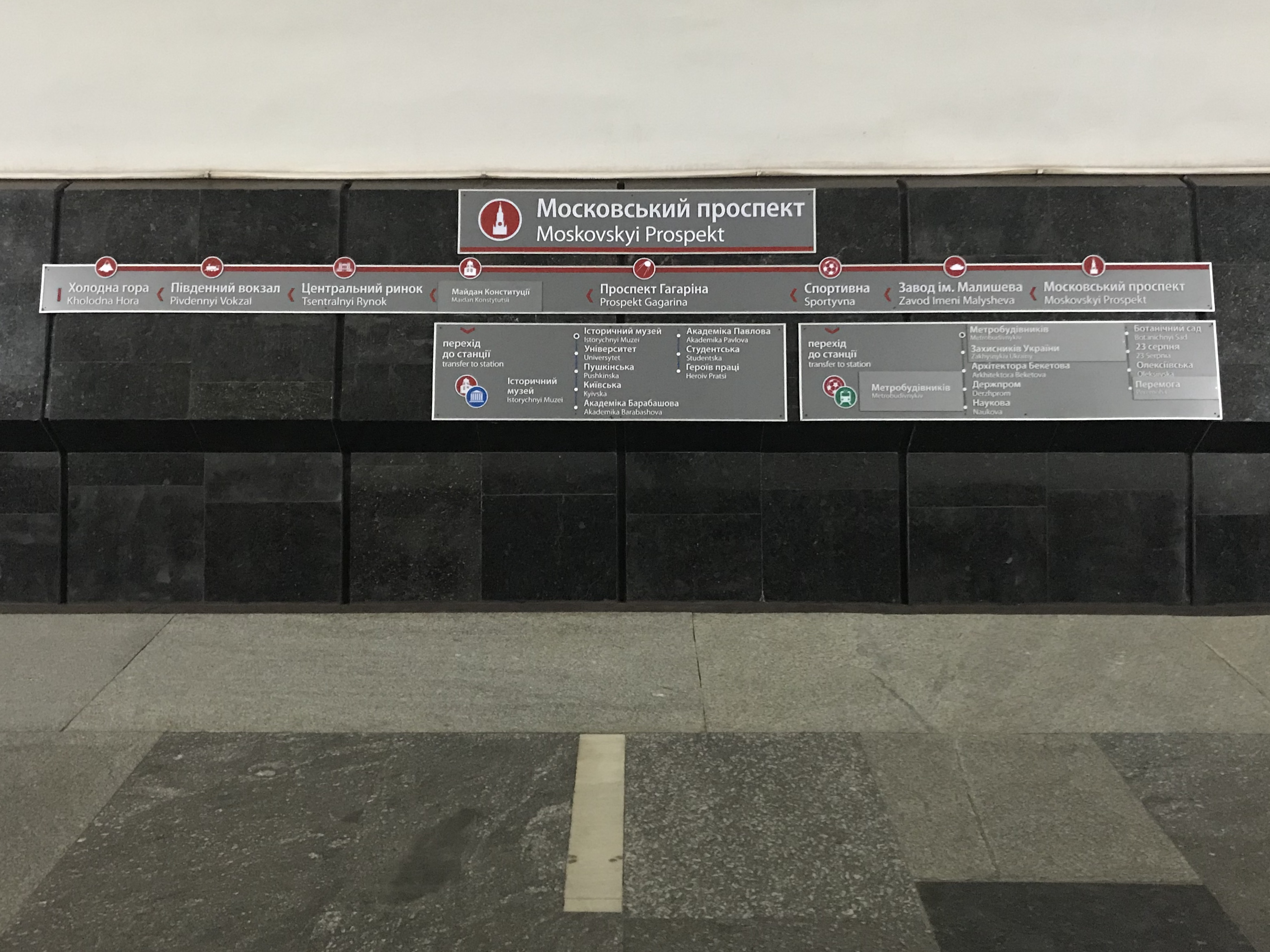
Kharkiv Metro Kholodnirsko-Zavodska line plan displayed above the track for trains terminating at Kholodna Hora in November 2017 (Turboatom station was named "Moskovskyi Prospekt" at that time)
