= Traktornyi Zavod (Kharkiv Metro) =

Kharkiv Metro station

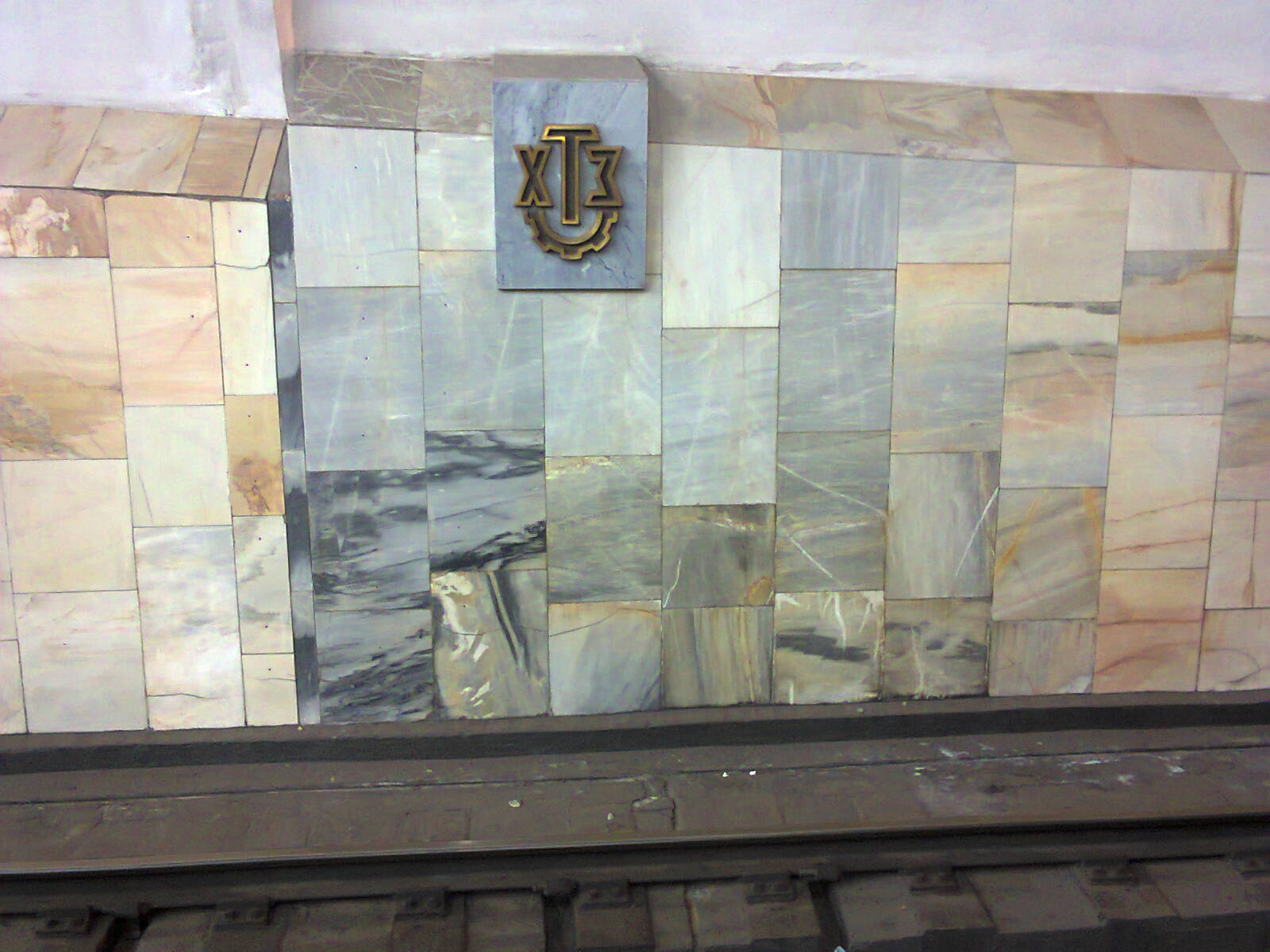

General information
- Coordinates: 49°57′10.46″N 36°22′44.38″E
- System: Kharkiv Metro Station
- Owner: Kharkiv Metro
- Line: Kholodnohirsko-Zavodska Line
- Platforms: 1
- Tracks: 2

Construction
- Structure type: underground
- Platform levels: 1

History
- Opened: 11 August 1978

Services
Preceding station	Kharkiv Metro	Following station
Imeni O.S. Maselskoho towards Kholodna Hora	Kholodnohirsko-Zavodska Line	Industrialna Terminus
Location

Traktornyi Zavod (Ukrainian: Тракторний завод,; Russian: Тракторный завод) is a station on the Kharkiv Metro's Kholodnohirsko–Zavodska Line. It opened on 11 August 1978. It is named after the Tractor plant located nearby.
