= Vokzalna (Kharkiv Metro) =

Kharkiv Metro station

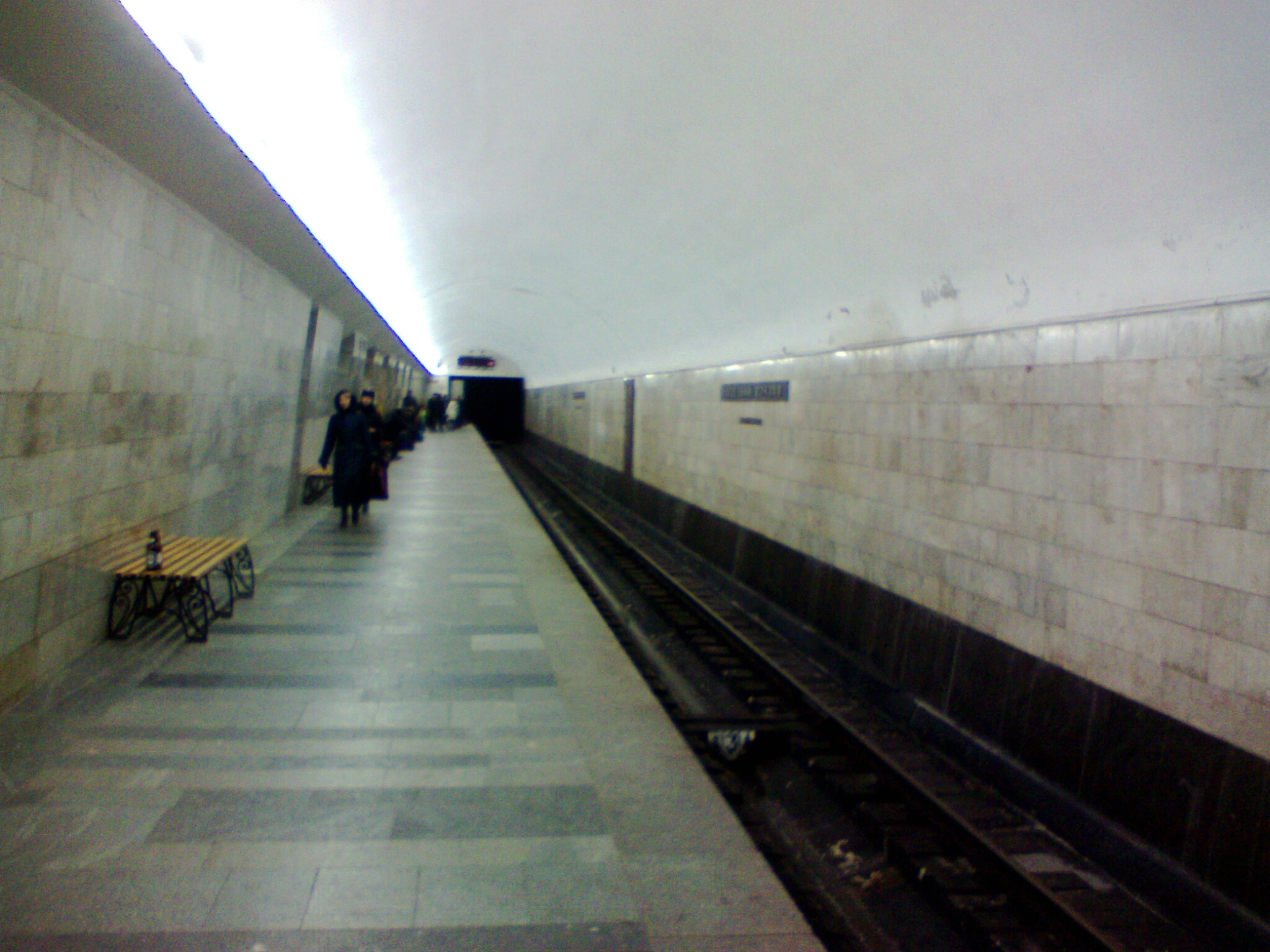
- The Station Hall

General information
- Coordinates: 49°59′22″N 36°12′18″E
- System: Kharkiv Metro Station
- Owner: Kharkiv Metro
- Line: Kholodnohirsko-Zavodska Line
- Platforms: 1
- Tracks: 2

Construction
- Structure type: underground
- Depth: 26 m (85 ft)
- Platform levels: 1

History
- Opened: 23 August 1975

Services
Preceding station	Kharkiv Metro	Following station
Kholodna Hora Terminus	Kholodnohirsko-Zavodska Line	Tsentralnyi Rynok towards Industrialna
Location

Vokzalna (Ukrainian: Вокзальна) is a station on the Kharkiv Metro's Kholodnohirsko–Zavodska Line. The station is situated between Kholodna Hora and Tsentralnyi Rynok. It derives its name from Kharkiv railway station, a major hub for long-distance and commuter rail services.

== History ==
The station was opened on 23 August 1975. Until April 2024 it was named Pivdennyi Vokzal (Ukrainian: Південний вокзал) (the Russian language translation was Yuzhny Vokzal). It is located beneath a square near Kharkiv's main railway station (Vokzalna means railway station). From the station hall, two pedestrian tunnels lead directly to the control building of the railway station and to the post office and out-of-town ticket counters within the train station.

The station is lain deeply underground and is a pylon trivault, which is separated by arcades of tracks. The station itself was designed by V.A. Spivachuk, and engineered by Y.E. Kruk and Y.A. Korovkin. The floor has been finished off with grey and black flags of polished granite. The lighting comes from hidden niches under the curved ceilings.

In spite of its depth, the Vokzal'na station was moored by the open construction method. The local hydro-geological circumstances confronted the engineers with a particularly difficult task. Because of the type of clay in the ground, the earth around the station had to be frozen, a task which took five years to complete.

When the first section of the Kholodnohirsko-Zavodska line was opened, only four train wagons were used. Five train wagon appearing later. All of the stations on the line were built with room to expand from carrying four train wagons to five, except Vokzal'na. When the station was enlarged, the entrance to the areas for the workers of the metro, which was previously located in the train tunnel, had to be incorporated into the station.

On 29 April 2024 Kharkiv Mayor Ihor Terekhov signed the order to rename the station to its new name "Vokzalna".

It features a direct connection to the passenger terminal of the Kharkiv-Pasazhyrskyi railway station, as well as transfers to tram lines 1, 3, 6, and 7.
