= Levada (Kharkiv Metro) =

Kharkiv Metro station

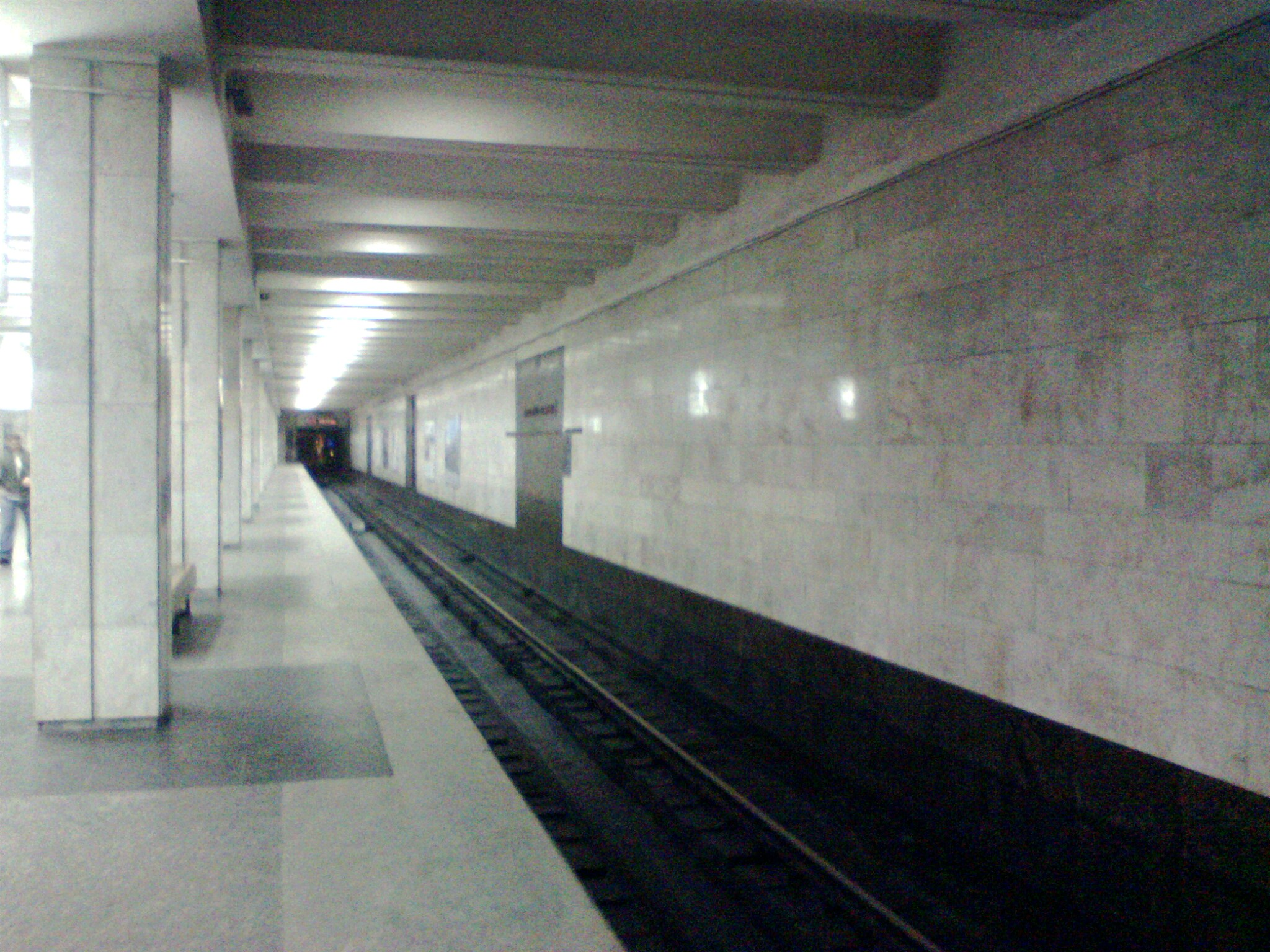
- Station hall

General information
- Coordinates: 49°58′51″N 36°14′36″E
- System: Kharkiv Metro station
- Owner: Kharkiv Metro
- Line: Kholodnohirsko-Zavodska Line
- Platforms: 1
- Tracks: 2

Construction
- Structure type: underground
- Platform levels: 1

History
- Opened: 23 August 1975

Services
Preceding station	Kharkiv Metro	Following station
Maidan Konstytutsii towards Kholodna Hora	Kholodnohirsko-Zavodska Line	Sportyvna towards Industrialna
Location

Levada (Ukrainian: Левада) is a station on the Kharkiv Metro's Kholodnohirsko–Zavodska Line. It opened on 23 August 1975. The station was named Prospekt Haharina (lit. 'Gagarin Avenue'), after Soviet cosmonaut Yuri Gagarin, from 1975 until 2024.

The station is located in the southern part of the city's center, at the beginning of the Aerokosmichna street, and near the Kharkiv-Levada Railway Station and the nearby bus station, which accounts for the station's fairly large passenger traffic.

The station was to be decorated in traditional Ukrainian motifs and lettering. On the walls there were supposed to be mosaics depicting grasses and flowers. However, the oblast governing board did not approve of the plans, and some time before the grand opening of the station, the architectural details were taken off, to be replaced with a more standard type of station.

The station is lain shallow underground and is a pillar-trispan, with square columns. The station itself was designed by V.A Spivachyk and P.G. Chechelnitskiy; engineered by P.A. Bochikashvili and V.S. Kotov; and decorated by A.F. Pronin and G.V. Tischenko. For the most part, blank marble was used, although grey granite was also used for the background of the station's name, which is seen in large aluminum letters. The lighting comes from groups of lamps placed in between the "ribs" (bars) of the ceiling. The floor has been paved with polished flags of grey and black granite.

Coming from the side of the station vestibule, the walls are made of light-rose coloured marble, Gazgan. The station has no escalators, since it is put shallow, and instead has wide stairs, above which are installed architectural stained glass windows depicting the triumph of the first man in space, Yuri Gagarin.

On 26 July 2024, the station was renamed to Levada as part of efforts towards decommunization and derussification.
