= Metalist Sports Complex =

Multi-use stadium in Kharkiv, Ukraine

Metalist Stadium
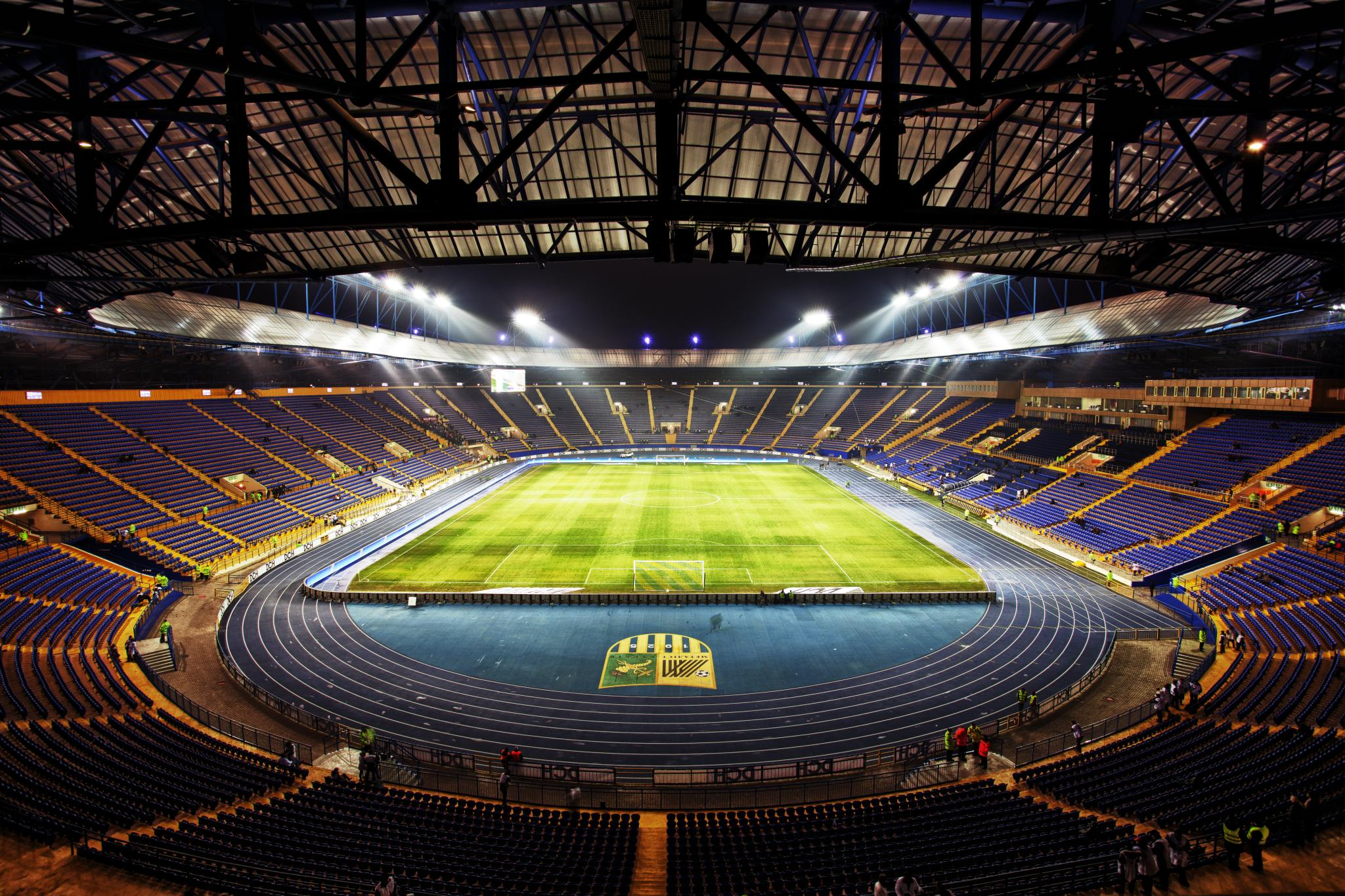
- UEFA
- Interactive map of Metalist Stadium
- Former names: Tractor Stadium (1926–1940); Dzerzhinets Stadium (1940–1967)
- Location: Heorhiia Tarasenka str. 65, Kharkiv, Ukraine
- Coordinates: 49°58′51″N 36°15′42″E
- Owner: Kharkiv City Council
- Operator: Metalist Kharkiv
- Capacity: 41,307
- Surface: Grass
- Record attendance: 42,000 (Metalist Kharkiv-Tavriya Simferopol, 23 September 1980)
- Field size: 105 m × 68 m (344 ft × 223 ft)
- Public transit: Kharkiv Metro station: Sportyvna; Metrobudivnykiv

Construction
- Groundbreaking: 1925
- Opened: 12 September 1926; 99 years ago
- Renovated: 5 December 2009
- Cost: ₴206,7 million
- Architect: Z. V. Permilovskyi

Tenants
- Metalist Kharkiv (1926–present); FC Kharkiv (2016–present); Shakhtar Donetsk (2017–2020): Major sporting events hosted; UEFA Euro 2012

The Metalist Sports Complex (Ukrainian: Спортивний комплекс «Металіст», romanized: Sportyvnyi kompleks "Metalist"), which includes the Metalist Stadium (Ukrainian: Стадіон "Металіст"), is a multi-use stadium in Kharkiv, Ukraine. Prior to the Russian invasion of Ukraine, it was the home stadium of the city's namesake professional football club and its local rival Metalist. The stadium, which was a venue for Euro 2012, currently seats about forty thousand spectators.

After FC Metalist Kharkiv financially collapsed in May 2016, the presence of professional football temporarily disappeared from the stadium. In August 2016 Metalist 1925, now FC Kharkiv, made the stadium its home turf. Shakhtar Donetsk followed suit in February 2017 as a result of the Russian invasion.

== History ==
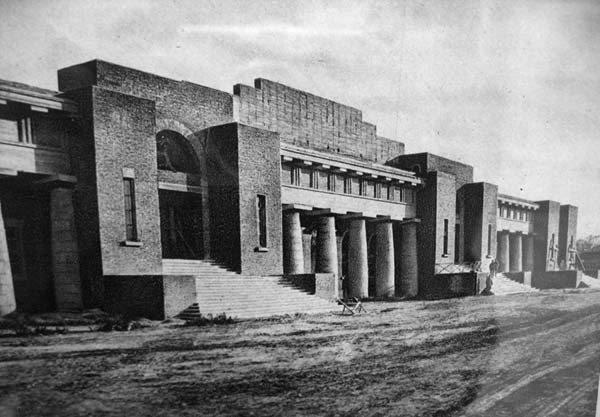
Pictured in 1930, the original main entrance to the stadium was completely destroyed during World War II

Construction on the stadium began in 1925 by order of Anastas Mikoyan and a decision of the Kharkiv Raion League of Steel Workers (Metalists). Opened on 12 September 1926, the new stadium was known as Traktor, as it was then being built by workers of the Kharkiv Lokomotive Factory (today Malyshev Factory). The stadium was built on territory of an old Holy Spirit cemetery that was active in 1772–1854 and was officially closed by the Russian Holy Synod at the end of the 19th century. On the moment of opening, it was the biggest stadium in the city, until 1931, when Dynamo Stadium was built.

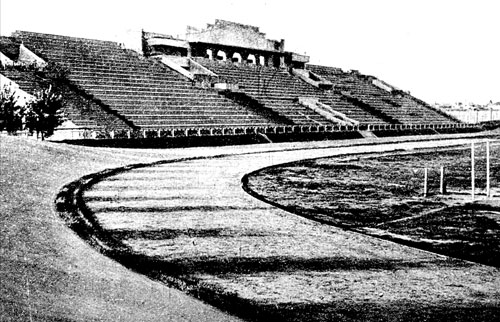
The West Stand of the stadium, ca. 1930.

Prior to World War II, the facility was renamed Dzerzhynets Stadium in honor of Felix Dzerzhinsky, the first head of the Cheka. Since 1967, it has borne its present moniker, Metalist; in that same year, the capacity of the stadium reached 10,000.

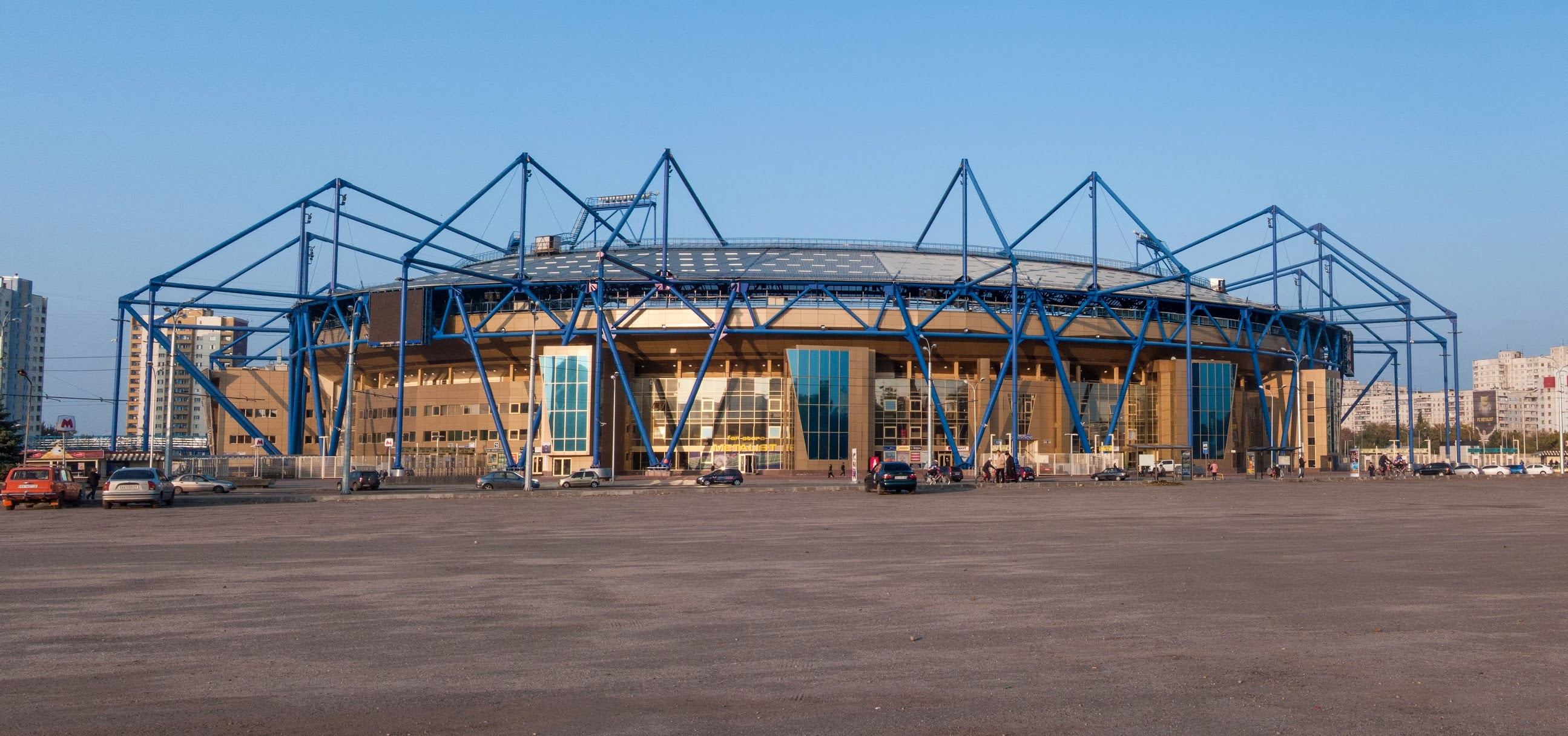
Panoramic view of the stadium

Including improvements for Euro 2012, the stadium has undergone four renovations over the course of its history. The first of these took place in the mid-1960s, when the western section of the structure was renovated. The next, begun in 1970 and finished four years later, saw the addition of the north and south stands, raising capacity to 30,000. The architect for the project was Yu. Tabakova. Also added were the stadium's first roof and drainage system, as well as floodlighting, an information panel, and a hotel, located under the north stand and gymnasium.

A third renovation was begun in 1979 to renovate the East and South stands but was completed only three decades later. After the demolition of the South Stand in that year, construction was halted indefinitely, resuming only in 1998 after a delay of nearly twenty years. A new East Stand and a partially reconstructed South Stand were erected.

Metalist's fourth set of renovations was ordered in preparation for Euro 2012. The South Stand was completed and a completely new East Stand was built. Roof replacement, other general modernizations and aesthetic improvements were completed by the end of 2009. On 5 December 2009, the renovated stadium was officially opened on the 50th birthday of Metalist Kharkiv's President, Oleksandr Yaroslavsky.

The South Stand contains a three-story shopping mall – business center "Metalist-Arena". The offices are rented here by UkrSibbank, several local businesses, and other banks. There is a pharmacy, a medical office, tour agencies, and other businesses.

On 19 December 2010, the Kharkiv City Council asked the Kharkiv Oblast Council to transfer the Metalist Stadium to the municipal ownership of the city. The then new owner of Metalist Serhiy Kurchenko proposed late December 2012 to buy Kharkiv municipal authorities' share in the Metalist Stadium. He did so in August 2013; from then (technically) the stadium owner is Metalist Stadium Sports Complex LLC, which is part of Metalist which is owned by Kurchenko.

After having finished the 2015–2016 Ukrainian Premier League season, Metalist Kharkiv ceased operating due to insolvency.

In August 2016, Metalist 1925 made the stadium its home ground.

Following the winter break of the 2016–17 season, Shakhtar Donetsk moved to the Metalist Stadium (150 miles to the north of Donetsk) in early 2017. Due to the Russo-Ukrainian War, this club cannot play in its actual home, Donbas Arena.

== UEFA Euro 2012 matches ==
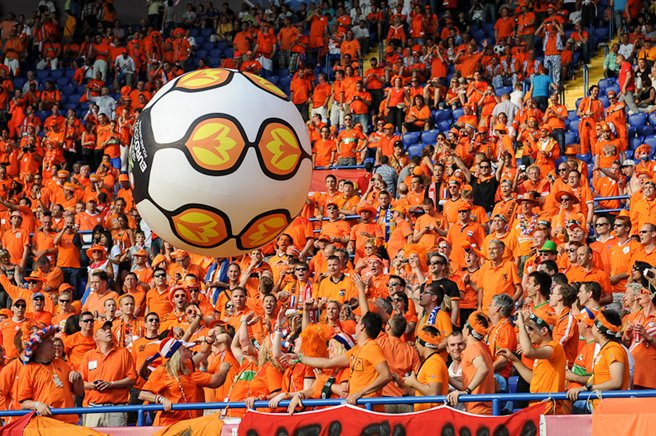
Dutch football fans during the Netherlands vs Denmark match at UEFA Euro 2012

The stadium was one of the venues for the UEFA Euro 2012. The three group B matches involving Netherlands were played there (with the other matches in that group played at Arena Lviv).

The following matches were played at the stadium during UEFA Euro 2012:

| Date | Time (CEST / EEST) | Team No. 1 | Res. | Team No. 2 | Round | Scorers |
|---|---|---|---|---|---|---|
| 9 June 2012 | 18.00 / 19.00 | Netherlands | 0–1 | Denmark | Group B | Michael Krohn-Dehli |
| 13 June 2012 | 20.45 / 21.45 | Netherlands | 1–2 | Germany | Group B | Mario Gómez; Robin van Persie |
| 17 June 2012 | 20.45 / 21.45 | Portugal | 2–1 | Netherlands | Group B | Cristiano Ronaldo; Rafael van der Vaart |

== Transportation ==
Sportyvna metro station

Metalist Stadium is located at 65 Heorhiia Tarasenka Street in the Slobidskyi District of Kharkiv. The stadium is bordered by Heorhiia Tarasenka Street to the south, Khramova Street to the east, and Vlasivskyi Lane to the west.

The stadium is served by comprehensive public transport infrastructure. In its immediate vicinity are four exits of the Sportyvna metro station (Kholodnohirsko–Zavodska line) and three exits of the Metrobudivnykiv metro station (Oleksiivska line). A tram stop operating routes No. 5, 8, and 27 is located adjacent to the venue, and the area is serviced by four bus routes: 232e, 244e, 251e, and 260e.

The arena is situated 7.5 km from Kharkiv International Airport, 5 km from the Kharkiv-Pasazhyrskyi central railway station, and 2 km from the Kharkiv-Slobidskyi suburban railway station. Additionally, it is located 1.2 km from both the Kharkiv Central Bus Station and the Kharkiv-Levada railway station.

== See also ==
- KhTZ Stadium
- Dynamo Stadium (Kharkiv)
