= Palats Sportu (Kharkiv Metro) =

Kharkiv Metro station

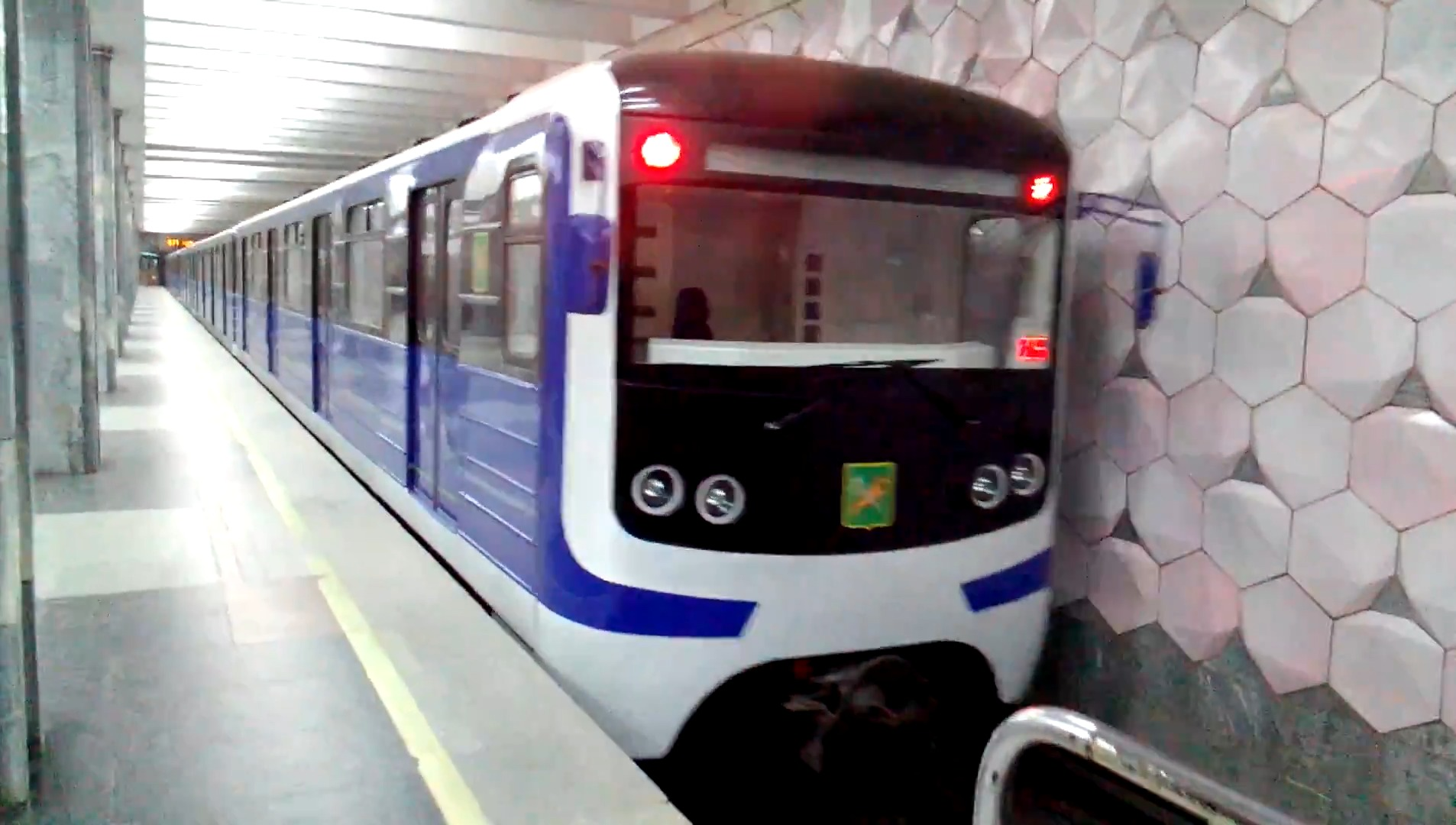
- The Station Hall

General information
- Coordinates: 49°57′57.84″N 36°19′16.47″E
- System: Kharkiv Metro Station
- Owner: Kharkiv Metro
- Line: Kholodnohirsko-Zavodska Line
- Platforms: 1
- Tracks: 2

Construction
- Structure type: underground
- Platform levels: 1

History
- Opened: 11 August 1978
- Former names: Marshala Zhukova

Services
| Preceding station | Kharkiv Metro | Following station |
|---|---|---|
| Turboatom towards Kholodna Hora | Kholodnohirsko-Zavodska Line | Armiiska towards Industrialna |
Location

Palats Sportu (Ukrainian: Палац Спорту, pronounced [pɐˈlɑts ˈspɔrtʊ], lit. 'Palace of Sports'), formerly known as Marshala Zhukova (Ukrainian: Маршала Жукова), is a station on the Kharkiv Metro's Kholodnohirsko–Zavodska Line. It was opened on 11 August 1978.

On 17 May 2016, the station was renamed according to the law banning Communist names in Ukraine.
