= Sumska Street =

Main street of Kharkiv, Ukraine

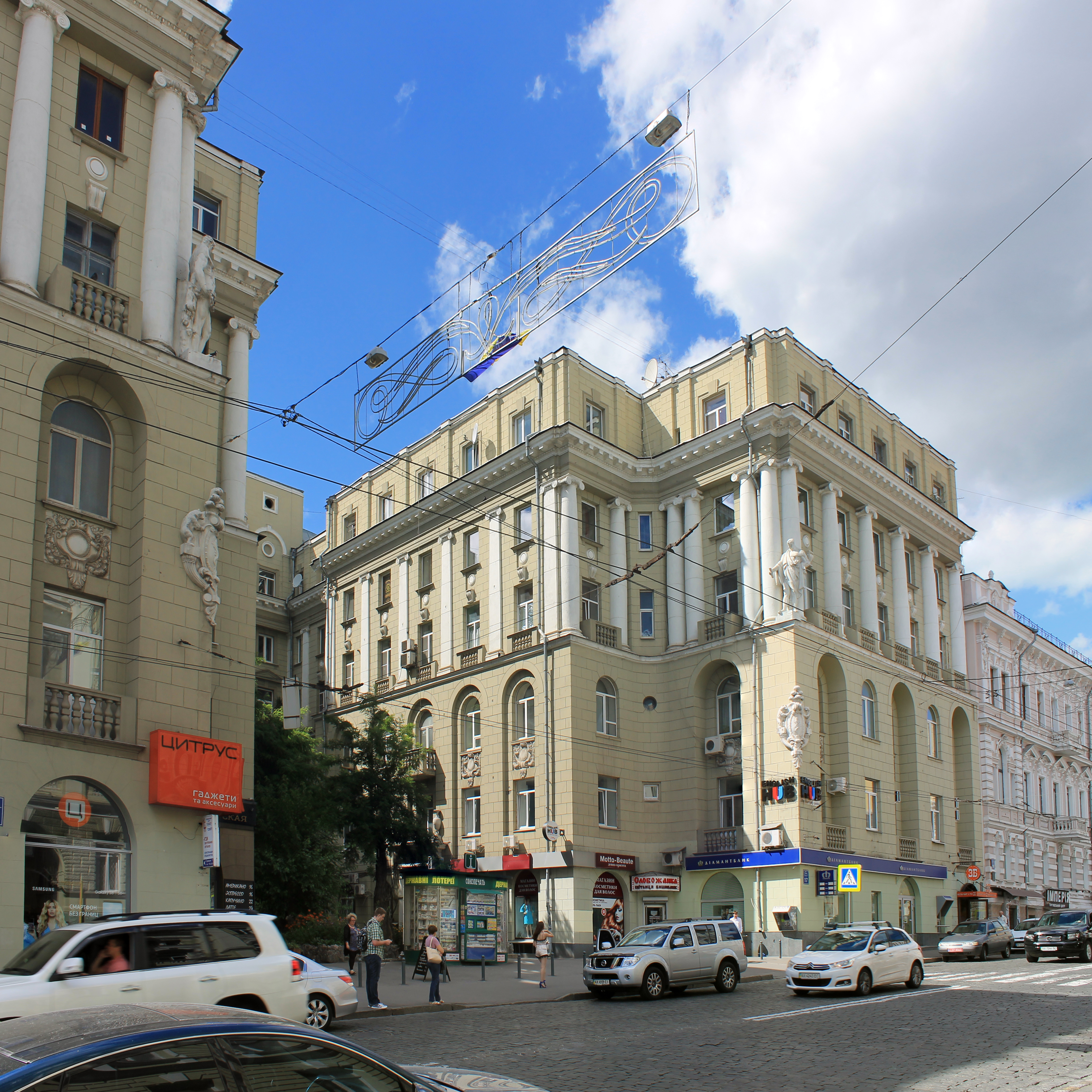
Sumska Street in November 2017

Sumska Street (Ukrainian: Сумська, Sums'ka) is the main street of Kharkiv, Ukraine. It stretches through the centre of the city from the Constitution Square to Bilhorodske shose (Bilhorod highway). The street also serves as an administrative line between Kyivskyi and Shevchenkivskyi district of Kharkiv city.

Sumska street appeared as a road from the Kharkiv fortress to Sumy and used to call “Sumskyi shlyakh” (Sumy roadway). However, in a short time the road was surrounded by the buildings and turned to vibrant street. In the 20th century it became the thoroughfare of the city.

The street is served by Kharkiv Metro, by the stations Universytet (University) and Istorychnyi Muzei (Museum of History).

== Gallery ==
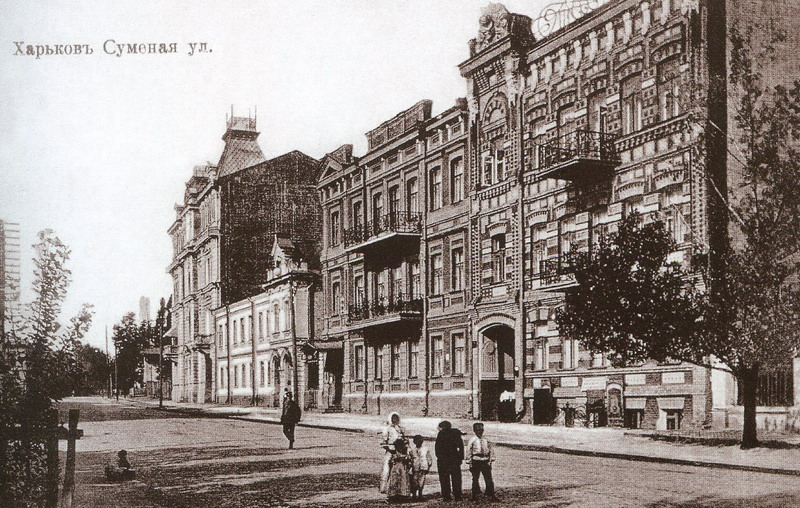
Sumska Street early 20th century

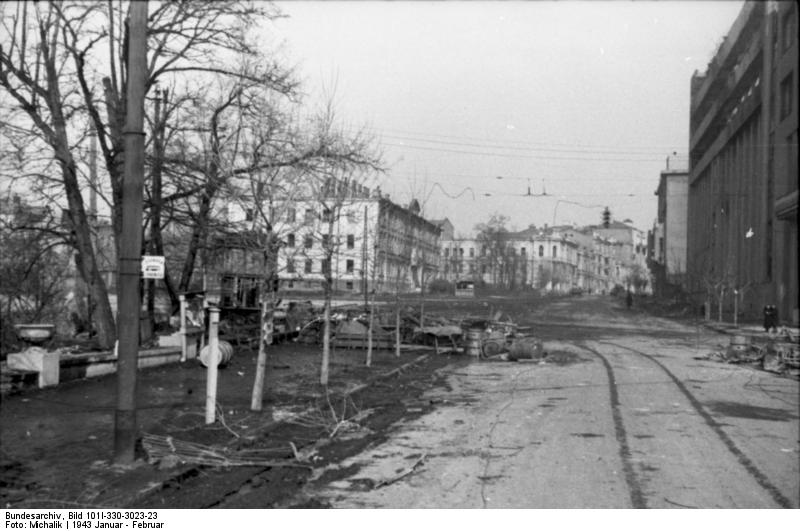
Sumska Street in January 1943

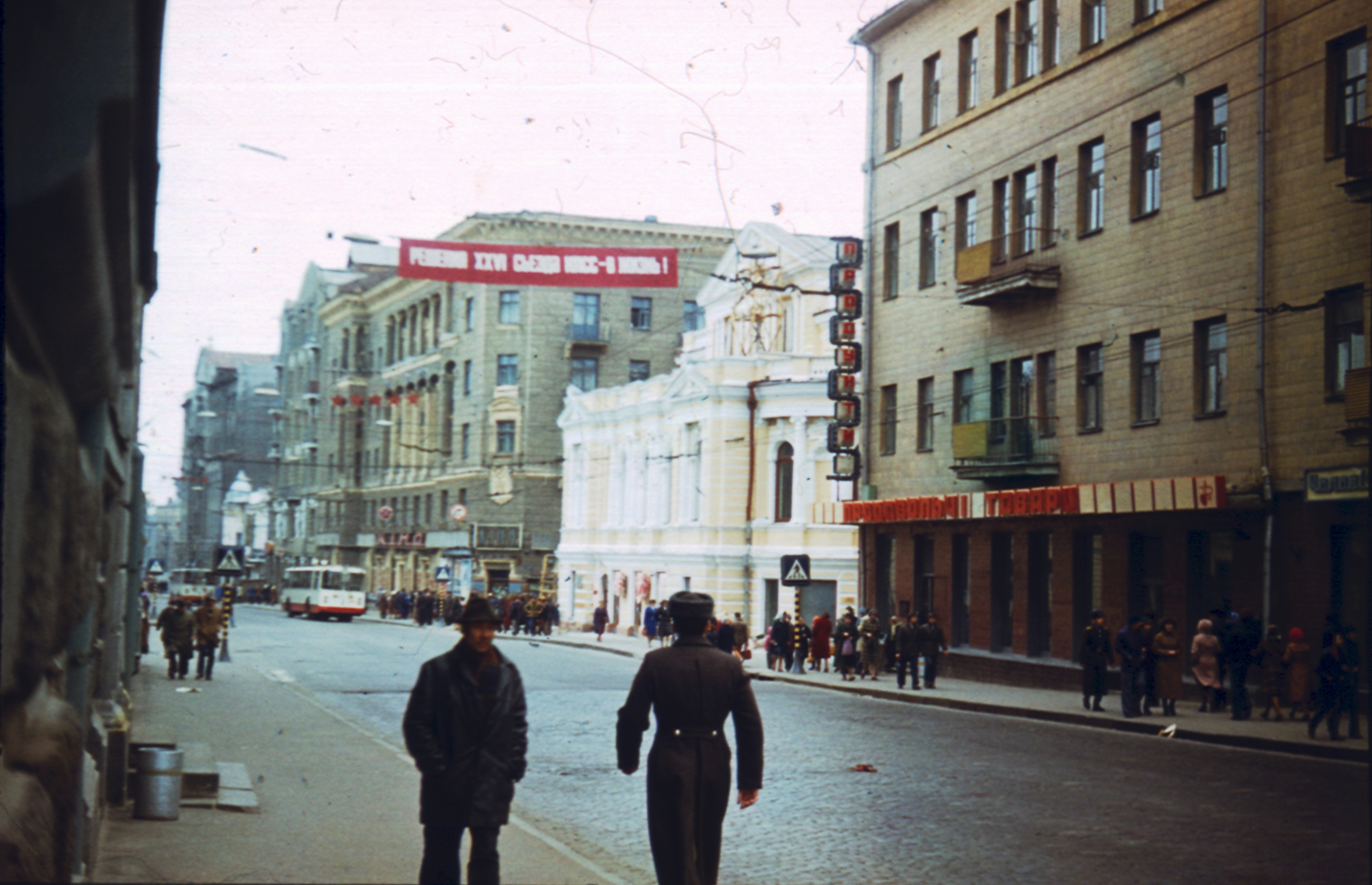
Sumska Street 1981

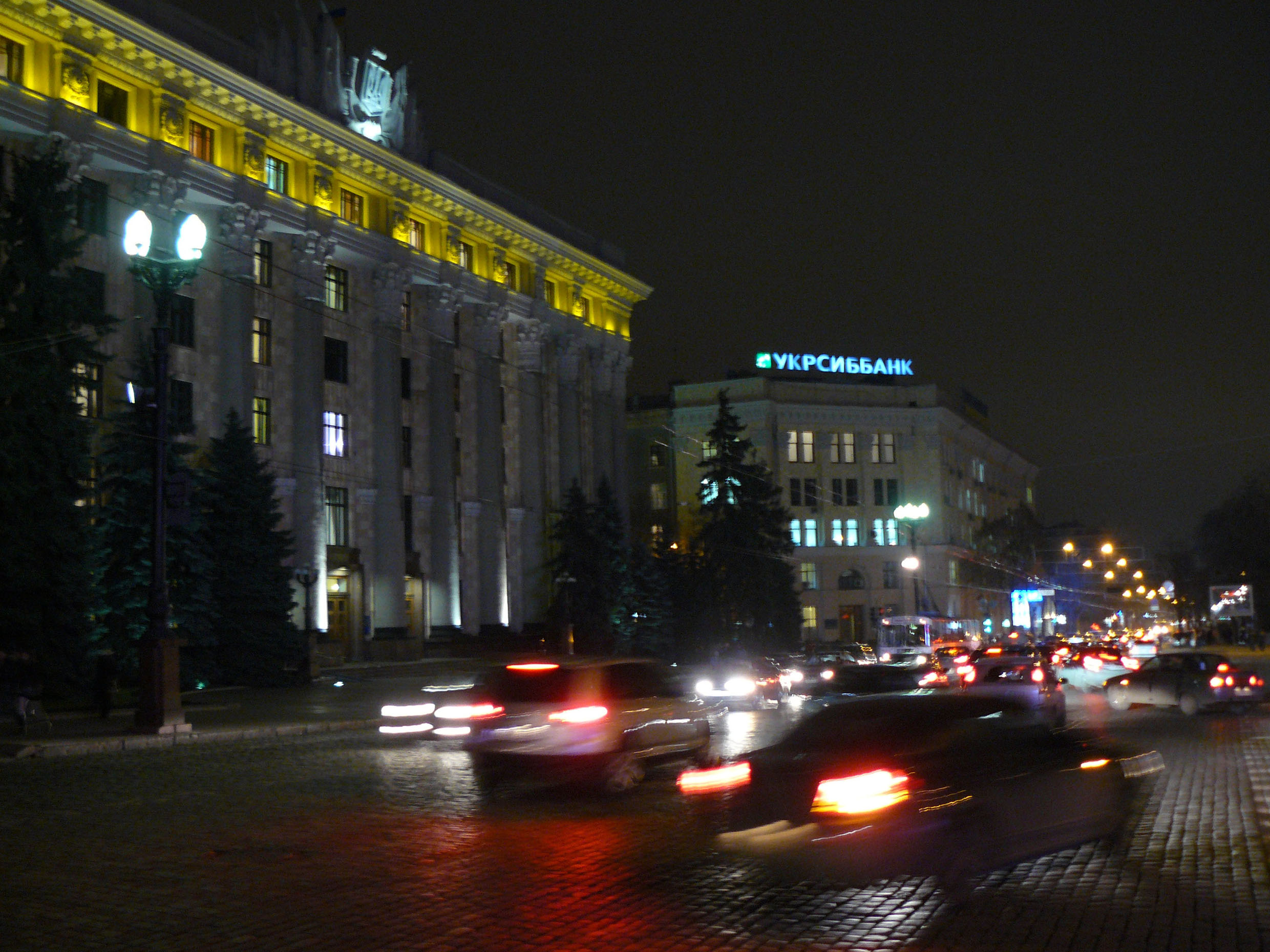
Sumska Street in 2009 with pictured on the left the Kharkiv Oblast state administration building

== Bibliography ==
- М.Т. Дяченко – Історія харківських вулиць – Харків, 1961
- Мачулин Л. Улицы и площади города Харькова – Харьков, 2007
