= Imeni O.S. Maselskoho (Kharkiv Metro) =

Kharkiv Metro station

- The Station Hall

General information
- Coordinates: 49°57′29.14″N 36°21′37.79″E
- System: Kharkiv Metro Station
- Owner: Kharkiv Metro
- Line: Kholodnohirsko-Zavodska Line
- Platforms: 1
- Tracks: 2

Construction
- Structure type: underground
- Platform levels: 1

History
- Opened: 11 August 1978
- Former names: Industrialna

Services
Preceding station	Kharkiv Metro	Following station
Armiiska towards Kholodna Hora	Kholodnohirsko-Zavodska Line	Traktornyi Zavod towards Industrialna
Location

Imeni O.S. Maselskoho (Ukrainian: Імені О.С. Масельського,; Russian: Имени А.С. Масельского) is a station on the Kharkiv Metro's Kholodnohirsko–Zavodska Line. It opened on 11 August 1978.

Until 2004, the station was called "Industrialna" ("Індустріальна"). In 2016, the metro station "Proletarska", also located on the Kholodnohirsko–Zavodska Line, was renamed to "Industrialna" to comply with laws banning Communist names in Ukraine.
