= Tsentralnyi Rynok (Kharkiv Metro) =

Kharkiv Metro station

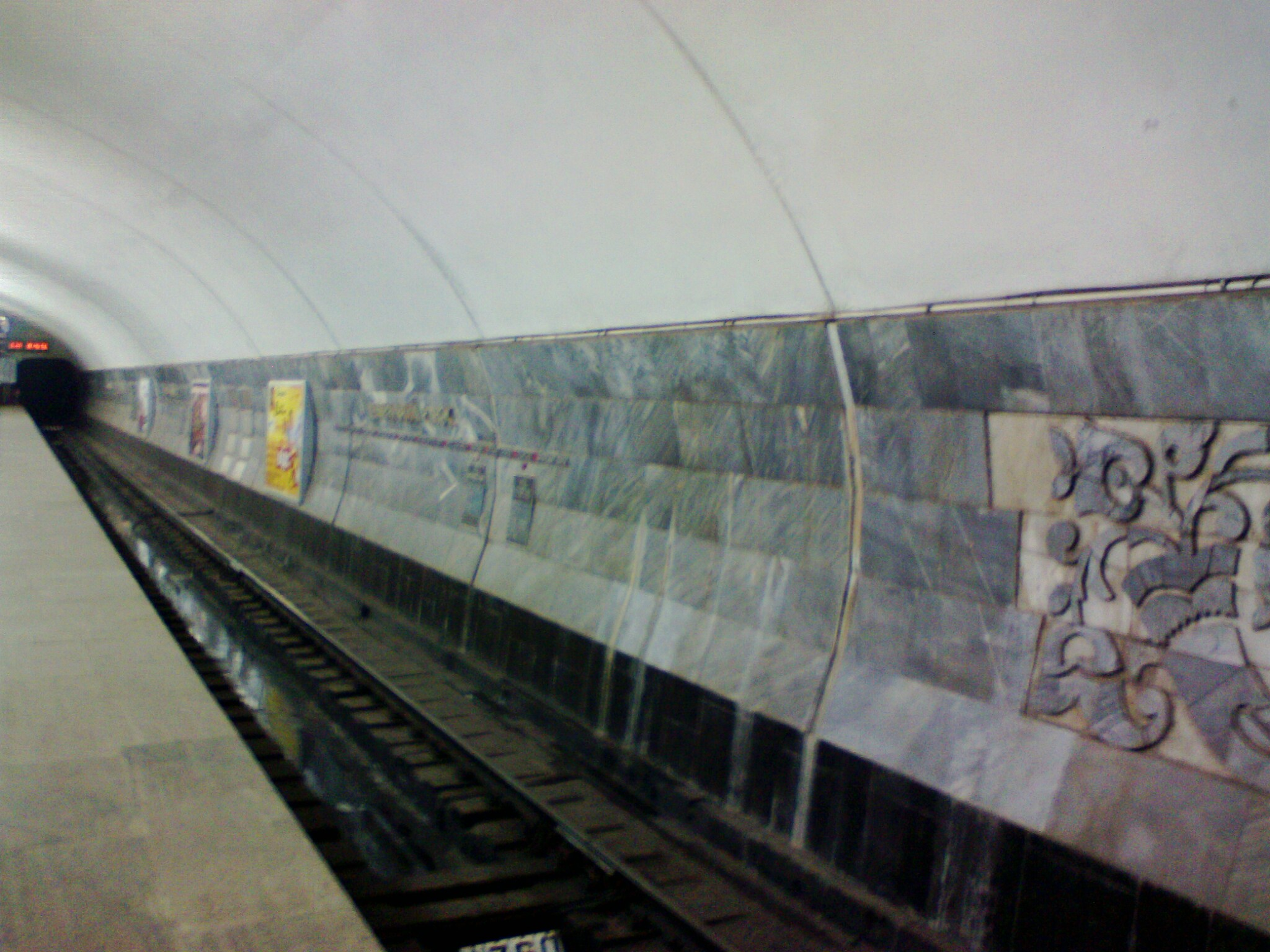
- The Station Hall

General information
- Coordinates: 49°59′34″N 36°13′11″E
- System: Kharkiv Metro Station
- Owner: Kharkiv Metro
- Line: Kholodnohirsko-Zavodska Line
- Platforms: 1
- Tracks: 2

Construction
- Structure type: underground
- Depth: 19 m (62 ft)
- Platform levels: 1

History
- Opened: 23 August 1975
- Rebuilt: 1996–1998

Services
Preceding station	Kharkiv Metro	Following station
Vokzalna towards Kholodna Hora	Kholodnohirsko-Zavodska Line	Maidan Konstytutsii towards Industrialna
Location

Tsentralnyi Rynok (Ukrainian: Центральний ринок,; Russian: Центральный рынок) is a station on the Kharkiv Metro's Kholodnohirsko–Zavodska Line. The station was opened on 23 August 1975. It is located in the central part of Kharkiv, near the No.2 bus station and the Tsentralny Rynok, literally Central Market, after which the station is named.

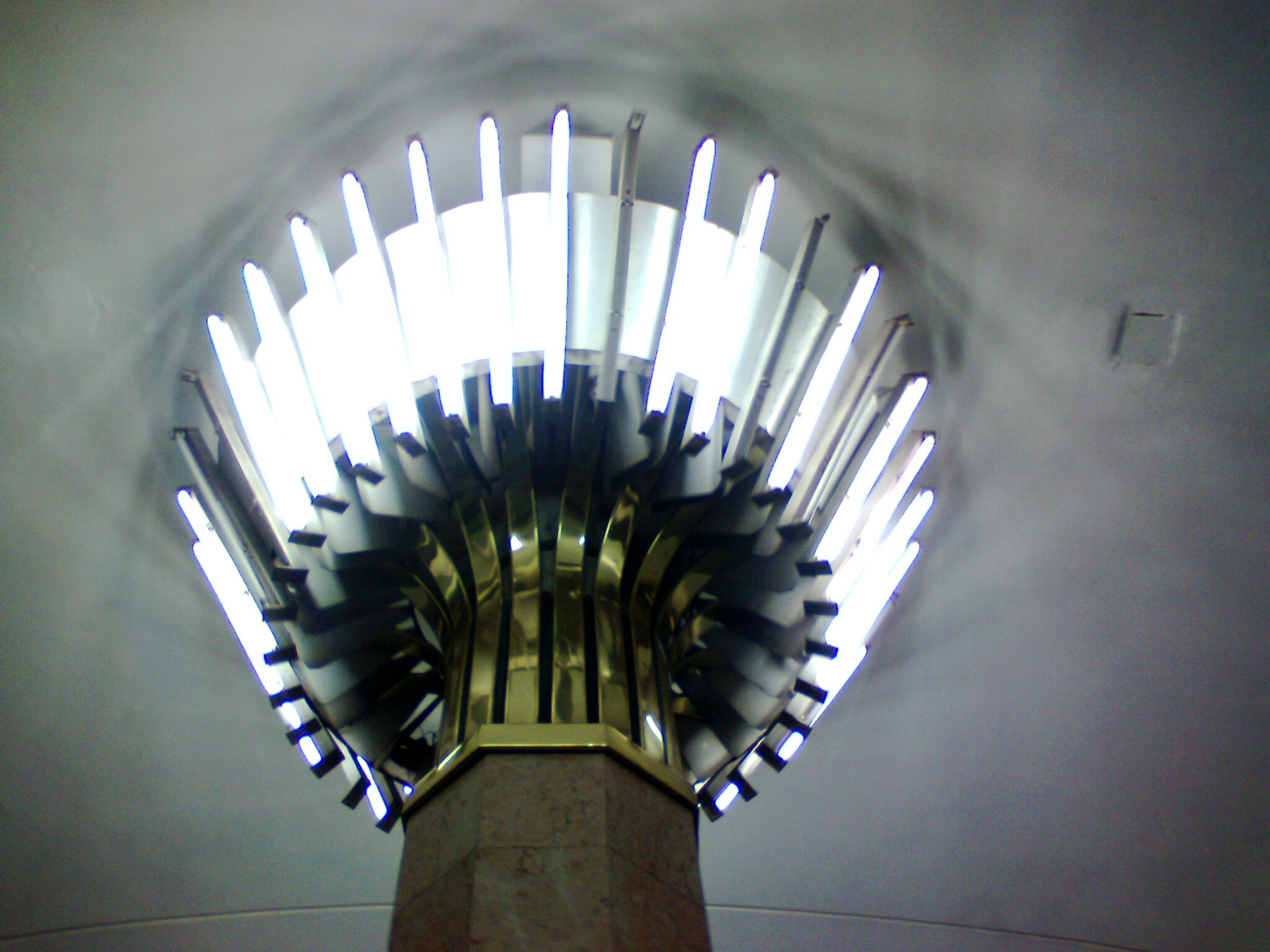
Lighting fixtures at the Tsentralnyi Rynok station

In the beginning, a station named Kommunalnyi Rynok was planned to be built in the Blahovishchenskyi District. But during the examining pre-construction stage, the hydro-geological circumstances proved to be too poor for its construction. As a result, the station was planned to be located some way to one side.

The station is laid shallow underground and is a single-vault design with a rounded ceiling. The station itself was designed by V.A. Spivachuk, and engineered by P.D Pashkov and Y.V. Lysenko. The partitions tracks have been held by grey marble, which has been introduced in traditional Ukrainian folk relief designs. The floor has been paved with multi-coloured polished granite, which is reminiscent of a carpet-like design.

Wide stairs which lead passengers to a station vestibule are located on both ends of the station, which gives the station an open feeling. The walls of the vestibule are decorated with light-grey and light-rose coloured marble.

The Tsentralnyi Rynok station is unique because it has a rounded ceiling which is held up with numerous rose marble columns. These columns were added in 1996 after serious deterioration of the ceiling caused by high levels of precipitation due to heavy rain fall in the summer of that year. However, during the columns' addition to the station, a task which lasted about a year, the station continued to be in full operation.

The Tsentralnyi Rynok station is located near Dim Trohivli (a four-story department store), Avto Vokzal 2 (a bus terminal) and the Kharkiv Yeshiva Ketana (a Jewish religious school for boys).

The station's exits are located near the Blahovishchenskyi Market, the Kharkiv Biscuit Factory, and the Kharkiv City Police Department. Additionally, the station is adjacent to Bus Station No. 2, which serves suburban routes (towards Bohodukhiv, Valky, and Zolochiv) and intercity routes to Sumy and Poltava oblasts. Passengers can also access nearby trolleybus (Route 11) and tram (Routes 7, 12, and 20) stops.
