= Line 1 (Kharkiv Metro) =

Metro line in Ukraine

Kholodnohirsko–Zavodska line
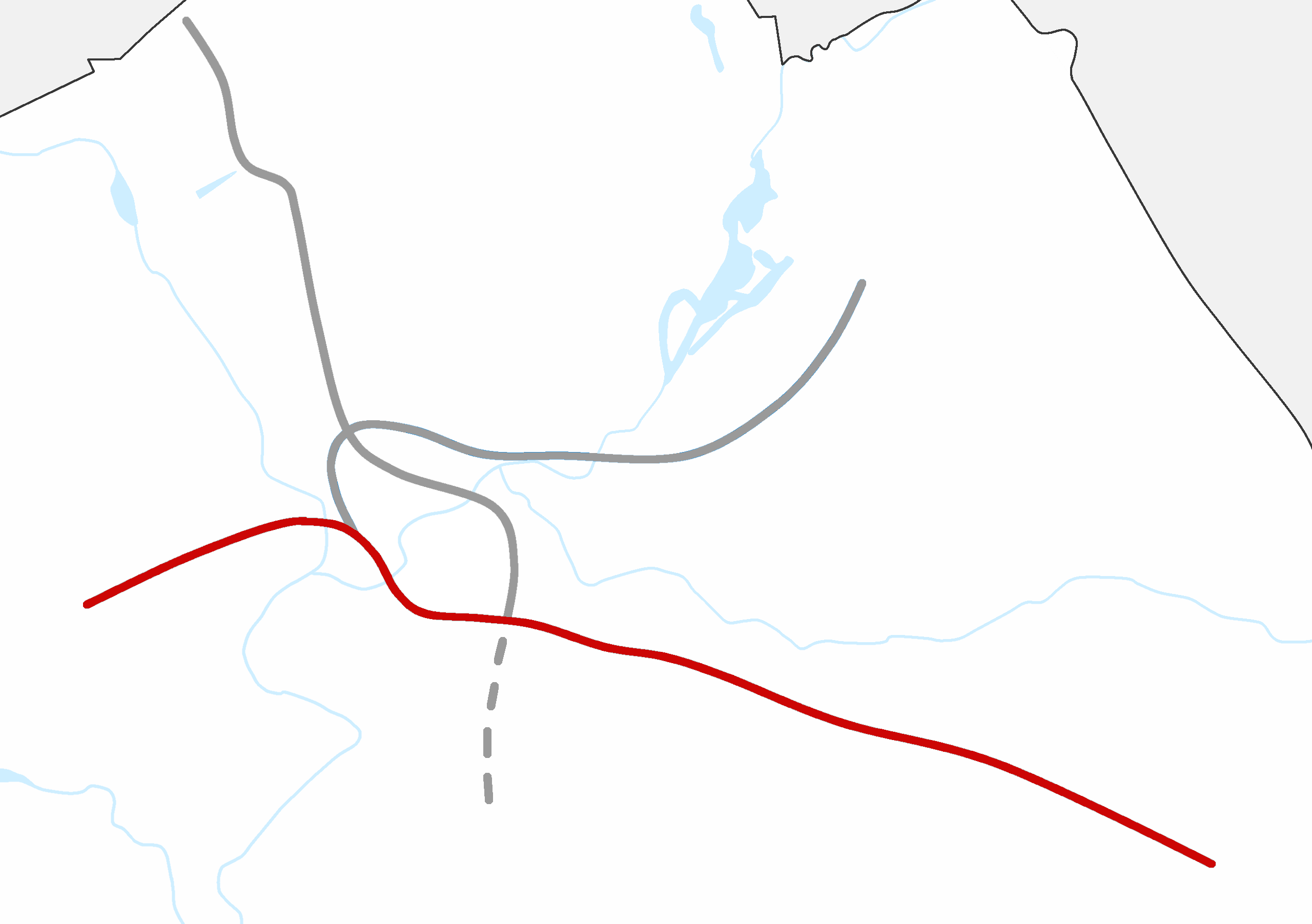

Overview
- Native name: Холодногірсько-заводська лінія
- Status: Operational
- Termini: Kholodna Hora (western); Industrialna (eastern)
- Stations: 13

Service
- Type: Rapid transit
- System: Kharkiv Metro
- Operator: Kharkivskyi metropoliten
- Rolling stock: 81-717/714, Ezh3, Em508t, 81-710.1 (modernized Ezh3 type)
- Daily ridership: 545,070 (daily)

History
- Opened: 23 August 1975; 51 years ago
- Last extension: 1978

Technical
- Line length: 17.39 kilometres (10.81 mi)
- Track gauge: 5 ft (1,524 mm)

The Kholodnohirsko–Zavodska line (Ukrainian: Холодногірсько-Заводська лінія; Russian: Холодногорско-Заводская линия) is a line of the Kharkiv Metro, serving Kharkiv, the second largest city in Ukraine. The line is the first segment of the Kharkiv Metro system, in operation since 1975. It is longest of the system's three metro lines at 17.3 kilometres (10.7 mi) and has the most number of stations (at 13), compared to the other two lines' eight (Saltivska line) and nine (Oleksiivska line) station segments.

Geographically, the Kholodnohirsko–Zavodska line cuts Kharkiv on an east–west axis, providing subway access for the industrial districts lining the Heroiv Kharkova Avenue with the city center. Since it is an important transport thoroughfare of both the metro and the city as a whole, the Kholodnohirsko–Zavodska line has the highest passenger traffic of the three lines, having a daily ridership of 545,070 passengers.

== History ==
In 1967, the Soviet Council of Ministers approved the construction of the Kharkiv Metro's first line, then referred to as the Sverdlovsko–Zavodska line (Ukrainian: Свердловсько-Заводська лінія). Subsequently, construction on the line began on July 15, 1968 near where the former Pivdennyi Vokzal station is located. On August 23, 1968, a date symbolic of the 25th anniversary of the liberation of Kharkiv from Nazi German occupation, tunnel construction began near the Radianska station (now Maidan Konstytutsii).

The first segment of the Kharkiv Metro system was built in relatively difficult hydrogeological situations. Specifically, engineers had to construct the line under two local rivers, the Kharkiv and the Lopan, and under two high traffic rail road stations, Kharkiv-Passenger and Kharkiv-Balashovskyi, respectively. Despite these difficulties, the first segment of the Kholodnohirsko–Zavodska line was finished relatively quickly, and was ready for its grand opening on August 23, 1975. The Kholodnohirsko–Zavodska line would be extended just three years later to encompass a total of 13 stations and 17.3 kilometres (10.7 mi) of running track.

Heavy rainfall in the summer of 1996 contributed to the flooding of one of the system's first stations, Tsentralnyi Rynok. During the reconstruction efforts, central vertical columns were added, creating a unique mix of single-vault rounded ceiling supported by numerous columns, which would otherwise be self-supportive. During its reconstruction, which lasted about a year, the station was fully operational and open to the public.

=== Timeline ===
Segment	Date opened	Stations	Length (Note: Approximate length, includes only operational passenger track length, does not include service track length.)
"Moskovske" Depot	July 30, 1975	-	-
Kholodna Hora–Turboatom	August 23, 1975	8	9.8 km
Palats Sportu–Industrialna	August 11, 1978	5	7.5 km
Total:		13 stations	17.3 km

=== Name changes ===
Following the fall of the Soviet Union in 1991 and the subsequent Ukrainian independence, some of the stations were renamed to more neutral equivalents, sometimes avoiding reference to significant Soviet institutions and their leaders. In addition to the renaming of the line to its current title with the subsequent name change at the Kholodna Hora station, several other stations were renamed.

- Komsomolska (1978–1994) → Marshala Zhukova (1994–2016) → Palats Sportu
- Vulytsia Sverdlova (1975–1995) → Kholodna Hora, named for the city's Kholodna Hora residential neighborhood.
- Industrialna (1978–2004) → Imeni O.S. Maselskoho, named after the Soviet Ukrainian politician Oleksandr Maselskyi.

On 20 November 2015 the station Radianska was renamed Maidan Konstytutsii to comply with decommunization laws

On 17 May 2016, the station Proletarska was renamed to Industrialna to comply with decommunization laws.

On 16 October 2019, the station Moskovskyi Prospekt was renamed to Turboatom also to comply with decommunization laws.

On 29 April 2024, the station Pidvennyi Vokzal was renamed to Vokzalna.

On 26 July 2024, the stations Zavoid imeni Malysheva and Prospekt Haharina were renamed to Zavodska and Levada respectively to comply with derussification laws.

== Stations ==
Most of the stations on the line were constructed shallow near the surface, with exception to the Vokzalna and Maidan Konstytutsii stations which were constructed deep underground due to the different elevations and hydrogeological conditions in those areas. Six of the shallow stations consist of a central platform and vaulted ceiling supported by five columns; the other five shallow stations have a single vaulted ceiling with no columns (with the exception of Tsentralnyi Rynok). The two deep stations are both pylon stations, in which the central hall is separated by arcades leading to the station platforms.

=== Transfers ===
Traditional Soviet metro planning stipulated the creation of the first line (almost always a system's Red Line), which would at some point in the future be expanded and crossed by future planned lines. The Kharkiv Metro is no exception to this traditional planning scheme; the Kholodnohirsko–Zavodska Line was built with the future expansion in mind. Currently, the two transfer stations from the Saltivska line (Blue Line) and the Oleksiivska line (Green Line) are both terminus stations, although a perspective extension would add two subsequent stations to both line segments. Specifically, the Kholodnohirsko–Zavodska line has two transfer stations:

#	Transfer to	At	Opened
	Istorychnyi Muzei (Saltivska line)	Maidan Konstytutsii	August 10, 1984
	Metrobudivnykiv (Oleksiivska line)	Sportyvna	May 6, 1995

== Technical specifications ==
Just like with the Kyiv Metro, government planning agencies allowed for a maximum of five carriage trains that would fit on the 100 metres (330 ft) station platforms without any modification to the station structure. Specifically, 25 five-carriage trains are assigned to serve the Kholodnohirsko–Zavodska line, serviced from the Depot-1 "Moskovske", located between the Turboatom and Palats Sportu stations.

The Kholodnohirsko–Zavodska line was the first metro line in the Soviet Union to use a unified central time system (Russian: ЦЭЧС-75), produced by the Khronotron factory in the city of Leningrad (nowadays Saint Petersburg in Russia). Before the introduction of this system, all of the stations of the system used an analog clock system, where in the intervals in between train arrivals a full rotation of the clock hand amounted to five minutes.

== Future extension ==
New construction work on the Kholodnohirsko–Zavodska line has not been conducted since the latest five station extension eastwards from the Moskovskyi Prospekt station (nowadays Turboatom) to the current terminus at Industrialna. However, two future extensions to the line are planned: Zaliutyne station westwards from the terminus at Kholodna Hora and Skhidna and Rohanska stations eastwards from the Industrialna station. These extensions are currently only perspective extensions and have been proposed continually since the late 1980s when those areas of the town were being populated.

Currently, the line serves its usefulness as the busiest line of the Kharkiv Metro system, connecting many industrial neighborhoods with the center of town. The Kholodnohirsko–Zavodska line's expansion both westwards and eastwards would be in the long term perspective at least, considering that no official initiative to begin the construction at either ends was outlined in the "Oblast Program of Construction and the Expansion of the Kharkiv Metropoliten, 2007–2012."
