= Industrialna (Kharkiv Metro) =

Kharkiv Metro station

General information
- Coordinates: 49°56′46.45″N 36°23′55.72″E
- System: Kharkiv Metro Station
- Owner: Kharkiv Metro
- Line: Kholodnohirsko-Zavodska Line
- Platforms: 1
- Tracks: 2

Construction
- Structure type: underground
- Platform levels: 1

History
- Opened: 11 August 1978

Services
Preceding station	Kharkiv Metro	Following station
Traktornyi Zavod towards Kholodna Hora	Kholodnohirsko-Zavodska Line	Terminus
Location

Industrialna (Ukrainian: Індустріальна; formerly Proletarska) is a station on the Kharkiv Metro's Kholodnohirsko–Zavodska Line. It opened on 11 August 1978.

On 17 May 2016, the station was renamed to conform with the law banning Communist names in Ukraine.

Until 2004, the Imeni O.S. Maselskoho station, also located on the Kholodnohirsko–Zavodska Line, was called "Industrialna" ("Індустріальна").
