= Kholodna Hora (Kharkiv Metro) =

Kharkiv Metro station

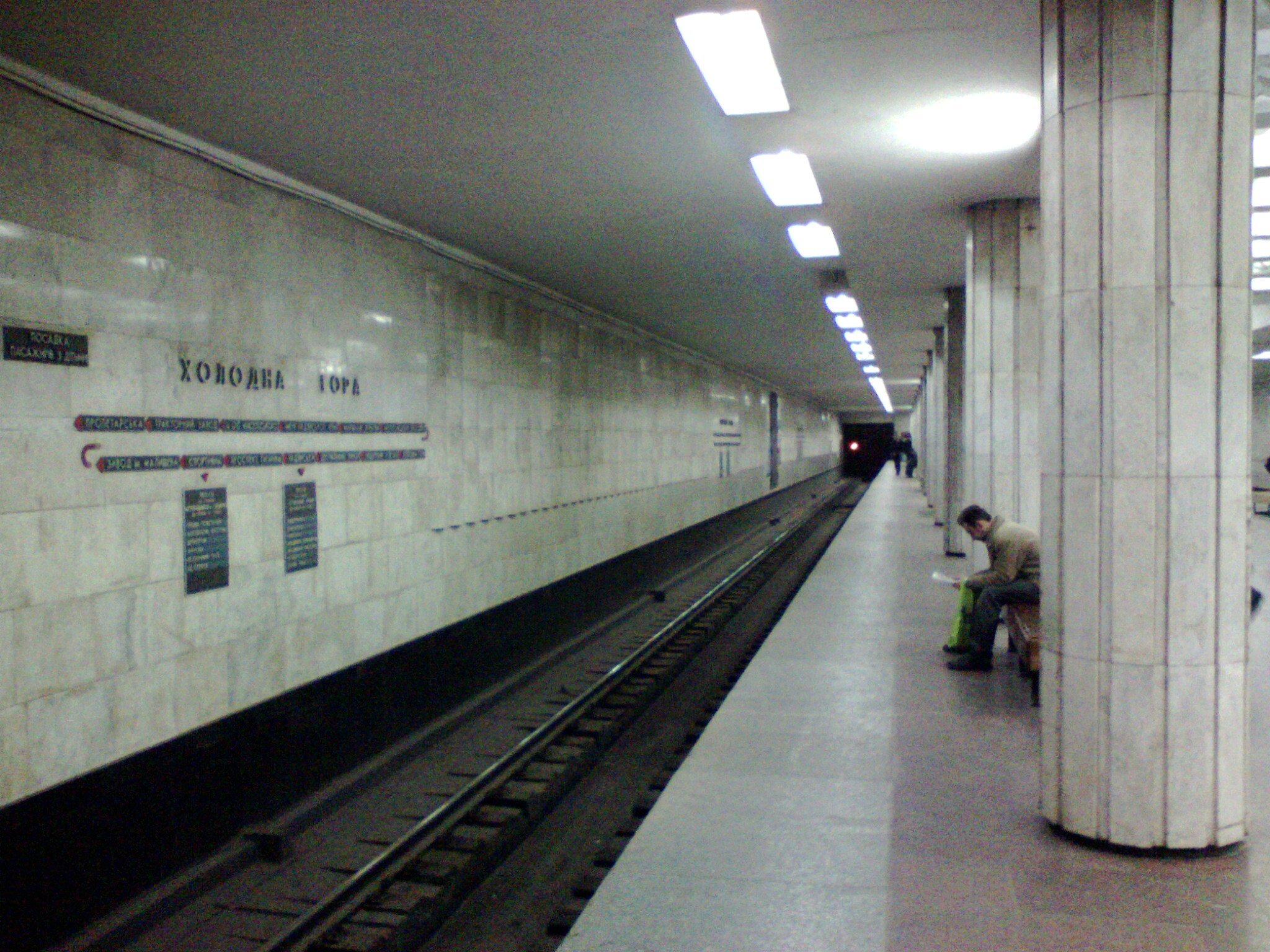
- Station tunnel

General information
- Coordinates: 49°58′58″N 36°10′58″E
- System: Kharkiv Metro Station
- Owner: Kharkiv Metro
- Line: Kholodnohirsko-Zavodska Line
- Platforms: 1
- Tracks: 2

Construction
- Structure type: underground
- Depth: 19 m (62 ft)
- Platform levels: 1

History
- Opened: 23 August 1975

Services
Preceding station	Kharkiv Metro	Following station
Terminus	Kholodnohirsko-Zavodska Line	Vokzalna towards Industrialna
Location

Kholodna Hora (Ukrainian: Холодна Гора,; Russian: Холодная Гора, lit. 'Cold Mountain') is a station on the Kharkiv Metro's Kholodnohirsko–Zavodska Line. The station is the western terminus of the line and was opened on 23 August 1975. It is located under the Poltavsky Shlyakh, in the middle of the Kholodna Hora residential district in the western part of Kharkiv.

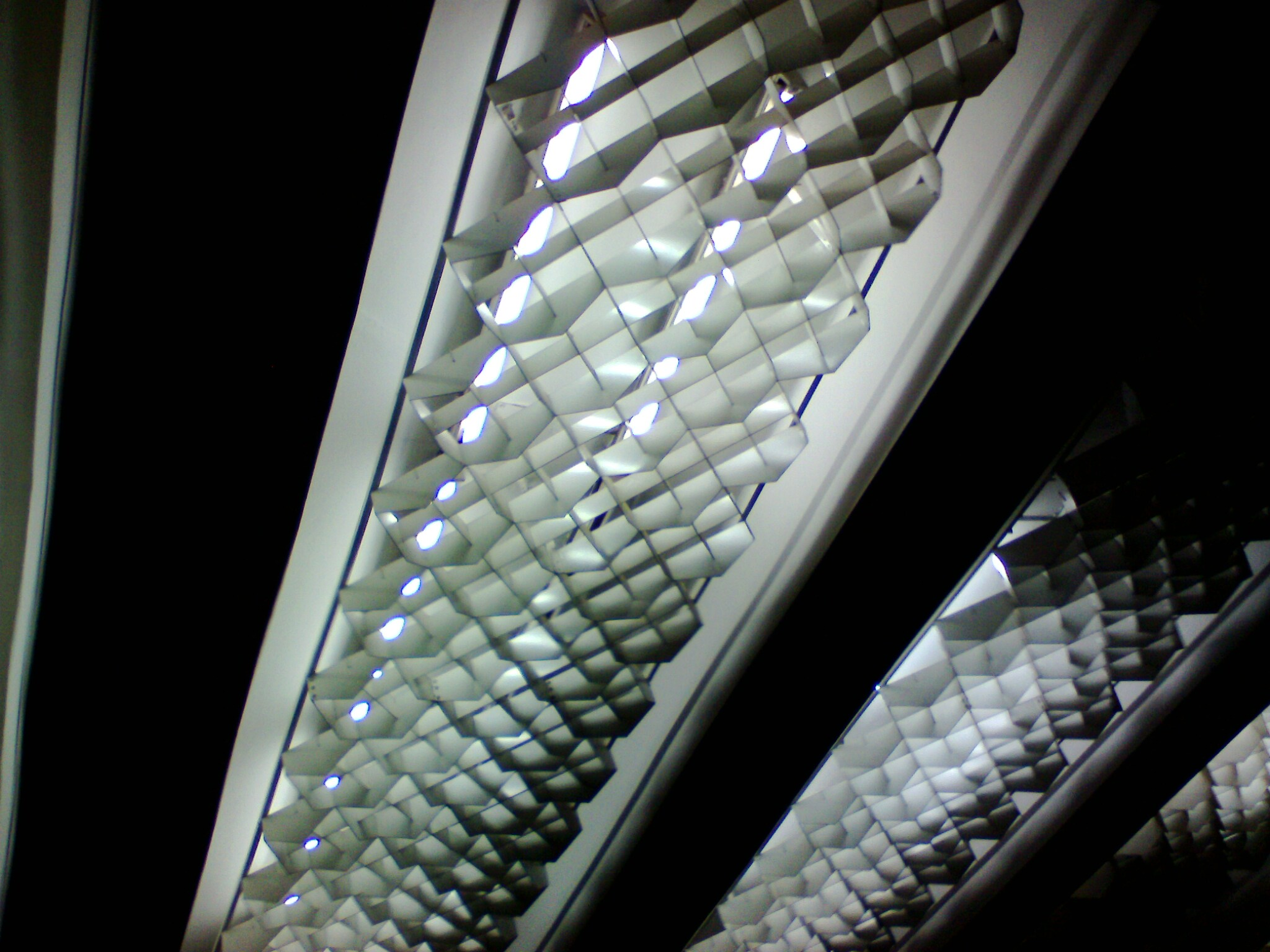
Station light fixtures

Kholodna Hora is the busiest station on the Kholodnohirsko-Zavodska line, as well as the entire Kharkiv Metro network. Its high ridership is driven by its proximity to a major bus terminal serving both municipal and suburban routes. Additionally, the station acts as the primary transit hub for residents of the city's western districts (Kholodnohirskyi and Novobavarskyi).

Until 8 October 1995, the station and the street on which it is located were known as Vulytsia Sverdlova (lit. 'Sverdlov Street'). Also, a bas-relief portrait of communist leader Yakov Sverdlov was located on the station, later removed. Two relief composite architectural items, which depicted communist scenes from the Velikiy Oktiabr and the Triumph of the Revolution, are still located on the station.

The station is put low underground, and is a pillar-trispan with many white marble columns. The floor of the station has been finished off with red granite. It was designed by V.A Spivachyk; engineered by P.A. Bochikashvili and N.D. Ivanova; and decorated by V.I. Lenchin, P.P Yurchenko, and I.P. Yastrebov.

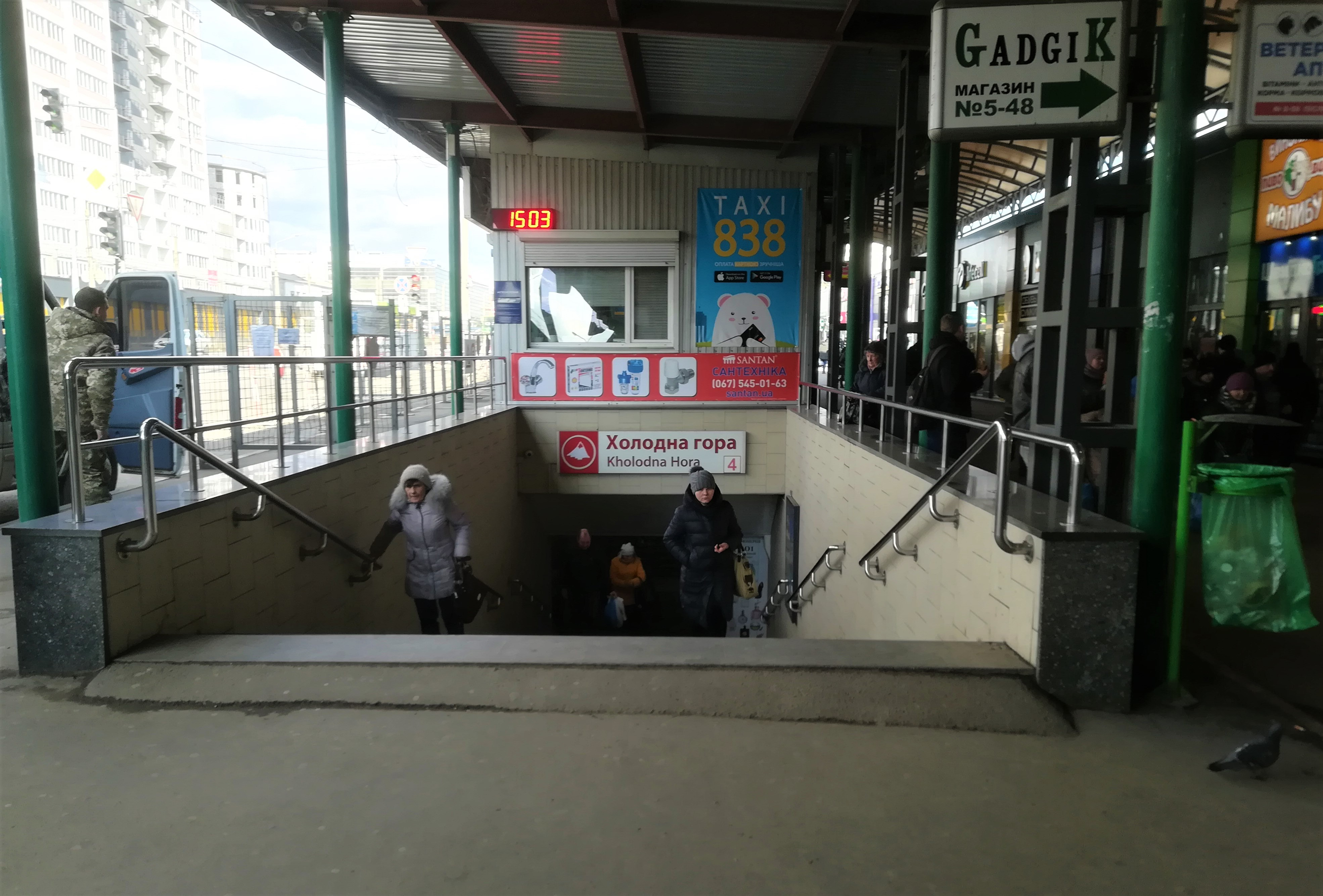
Station exit towards the bus station

The Kholodna Hora station has two vestibules that are directly connected to the station and two exits, which have pedestrian cross tunnels under the Poltavskyi Shliakh. The large amount of passenger traffic on the station is accounted for by the many bus routes passing nearby, the buses carrying passengers to the neighboring towns and villages (routes to Merefa and Liubotyn).
