= Kharkiv International Airport =

Commercial airport serving Kharkiv, Ukraine

Kharkiv International Airport Міжнародний аеропорт «Харків»

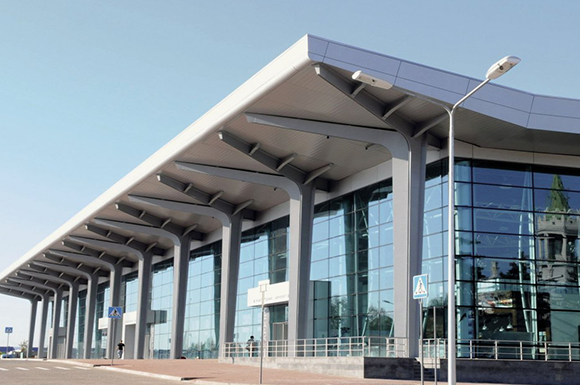
- IATA: HRK; ICAO: UKHH; WMO: 34300

Summary
- Airport type: Public
- Operator: "New Systems AM" LLC
- Location: Kharkiv, Ukraine
- Opened: 6 December 1932; 93 years ago
- Focus city for: SkyUp; Ukraine International Airlines; Wizz Air
- Built: 1954; 72 years ago
- Elevation AMSL: 508 ft (155 m)
- Coordinates: 49°55′29″N 36°17′24″E
- Website: hrk.aero

Maps
- Location of airport in Ukraine HRK (Ukraine)
- Interactive map of Kharkiv International Airport

Runways
Direction	Length		Surface
Direction	ft	m	Surface
07/25	8,202	2,500	Concrete
08/26 (not active)	4,921	1,500	Asphalt

Statistics (2019)
- Passengers: ▲1,340,800
- Aircraft departures: ▲5,590
- Statistics: airport website

Kharkiv International Airport (Ukrainian: Міжнародний аеропорт «Харків») (IATA: HRK, ICAO: UKHH) is an airport located in Kharkiv, Ukraine.

The airport is located in the Slobidskiy District, 12 kilometres (7.5 mi) south of the center of Kharkiv, and is the largest airport in eastern Ukraine. It is capable of handling aircraft such as the Airbus A320, Boeing 737, Boeing 757, and Airbus A321, along with lighter types, as well as wide-body and heavy aircraft including the Boeing 767, Airbus A330, and Antonov An-124.

On 24 February 2022, Ukraine closed airspace to civilian flights due to the Russian invasion of Ukraine.

== History ==
Early years

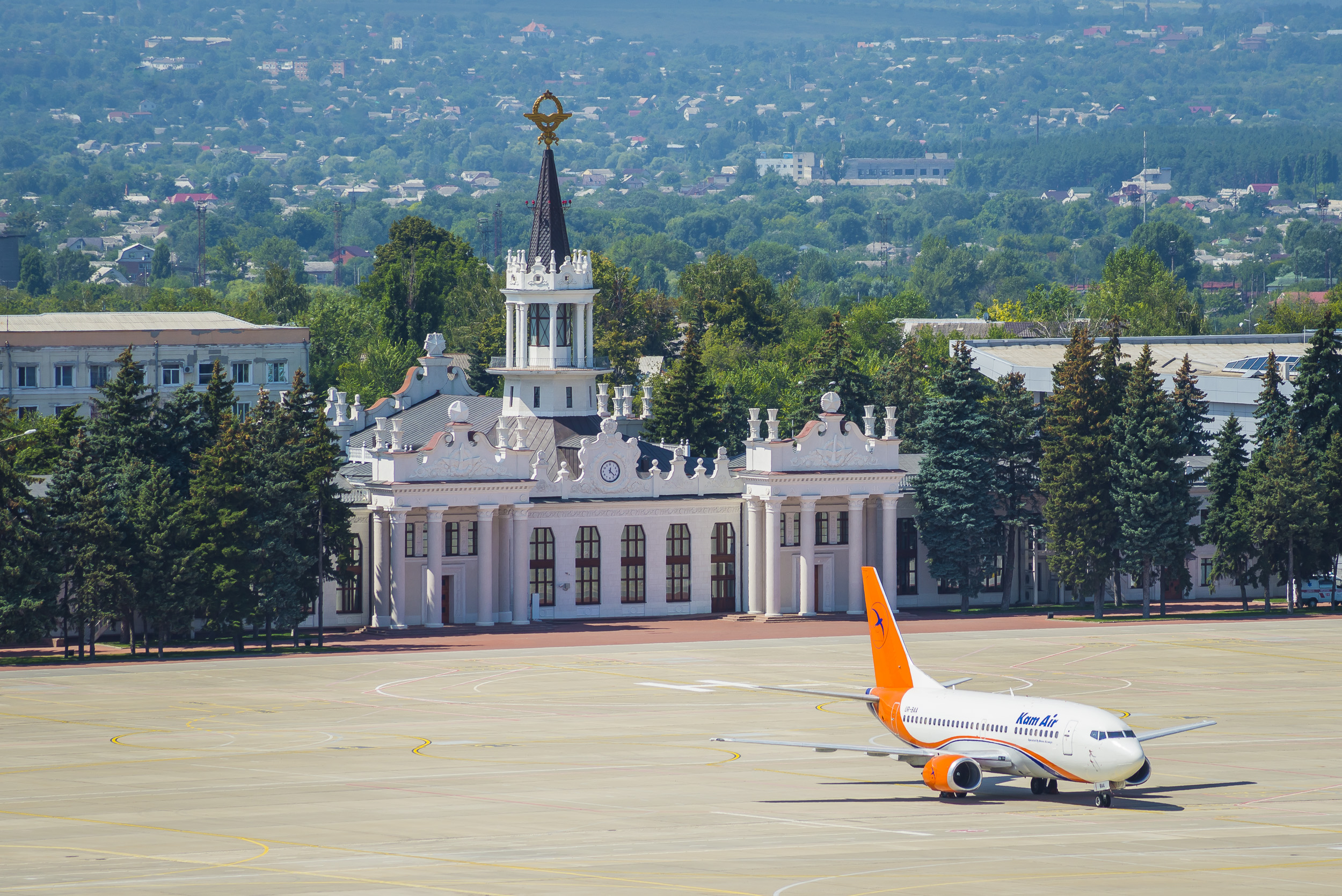
Old terminal

On March 26, 1923, the joint-stock company Ukrpovitroshliakh was established in Kharkiv, with one of its primary objectives being the organization of regular flights. On May 25, 1924, the company launched its first regular passenger routes: Kharkiv–Poltava–Kyiv and Kharkiv–Kropyvnytskyi–Odesa. At the time, the unpaved airfield was located on the northern outskirts of the city, beyond the municipal park in Sokolnyky, where the Kharkiv State Aircraft Manufacturing Company is now situated.

In 1926, the Ukrainian SSR Council of People's Commissars Aviation Plant was established on the basis of the Ukrpovitroshliakh aviation workshops. The development of aircraft manufacturing in Sokolnyky necessitated the relocation of the civil airport. A site located 12 kilometers south of the city center, beyond the Osnova settlement, was chosen for the new airport.

In 1928, Kharkiv began operating its first international flights on the Kharkiv–Tehran route.

The new airport opened on December 6, 1932, featuring an unpaved runway, a two-story terminal building, and other ground services.

In August 1933, the airport was named after Pavel Postyshev.

In 1936, the airport was recognized as the best in the USSR.

In the pre-war years, transit flights from Moscow and Leningrad to Crimea and the Caucasus landed at Kharkiv Airport. It also hosted the world's largest passenger aircraft of its time, the six-engine PS-124 giant (ANT-20bis), which operated on the Moscow–Kharkiv–Mineralnye Vody route.

In 1941, a concrete runway was built at the airfield. In 1940–1941, the airport constructed two cement-concrete runways 1,000 meters long and 80 meters wide, taxiways, brick and cement-concrete parking areas, a terminal, warehouses, and two iron hangars. The airport was equipped with a radio beacon.

Monument to the pilots who died during the Great Patriotic War

With the outbreak of the German-Soviet War, the airport's personnel were incorporated into the Kyiv and Kharkiv Special Aviation Groups of the Civil Air Fleet.

During World War II, Kharkiv Osnova Airport was heavily damaged: the airfield, runways, taxiways, and aircraft parking areas were rendered entirely unusable. Contemporary survey reports indicate there were two to three bomb craters for every 100 meters. The hangars and terminal building were also destroyed.

The existing terminal building was constructed in the post-war years based on a standard design developed in 1951 by the Moscow-based Aeroproekt Research Institute (architects G. Elkin, G. Kryukov, and G. Mitkevich).

Postal envelope with image of Kharkiv airport

By the early 1970s, Kharkiv Airport was serving up to 600,000 passengers annually, and a decade later, this figure rose to 900,000 people. At the same time, the city expanded right up to the airport boundaries. Consequently, the city's master plan developed in the late 1970s and early 1980s provided for the construction of a new airport, "Kharkiv-Polevoy," near the urban-type settlement of Poleva in the Derhachi Raion, located 30 kilometers from Kharkiv. In the future, the assembly shops of the aviation plant were also planned to be relocated there. The design for the new airport was developed by the Ukraeroproekt institute, and the terminal building by Ukrgorstroyproekt. The airport was planned to be connected to the city by a high-speed highway. In the late 1980s, construction of the runway began, but work was interrupted with the dissolution of the Soviet Union.

Development since the 1990s

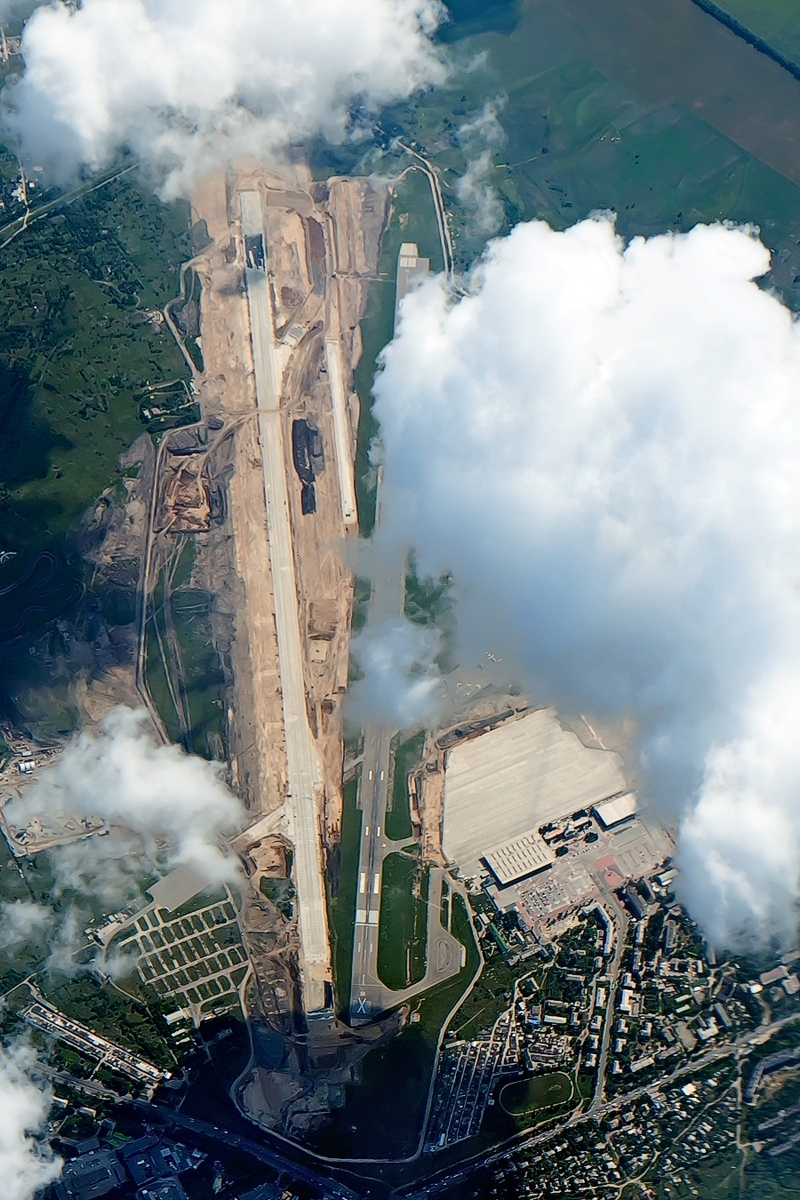
Aerial view of the airport

In 1995, a renovation was carried out, which included a major overhaul of the airport building and the establishment of a border and customs control checkpoint. The runway was also upgraded, enabling the airport to operate as a full-fledged international enterprise and receive clearance for Il-76 aircraft flights.

In March 2008, the entire property complex of Kharkiv Airport was leased for 49 years to Oleksandr Yaroslavskyi DCH investment group. The runway, as a strategic asset, remained state-owned. A large-scale reconstruction project for the airport was developed by the Kharkiv-based company Arcstone under the guidance of Airport Consulting Vienna (Austria) and the Airport Research Center (Germany), and implementation began in the second half of 2008.

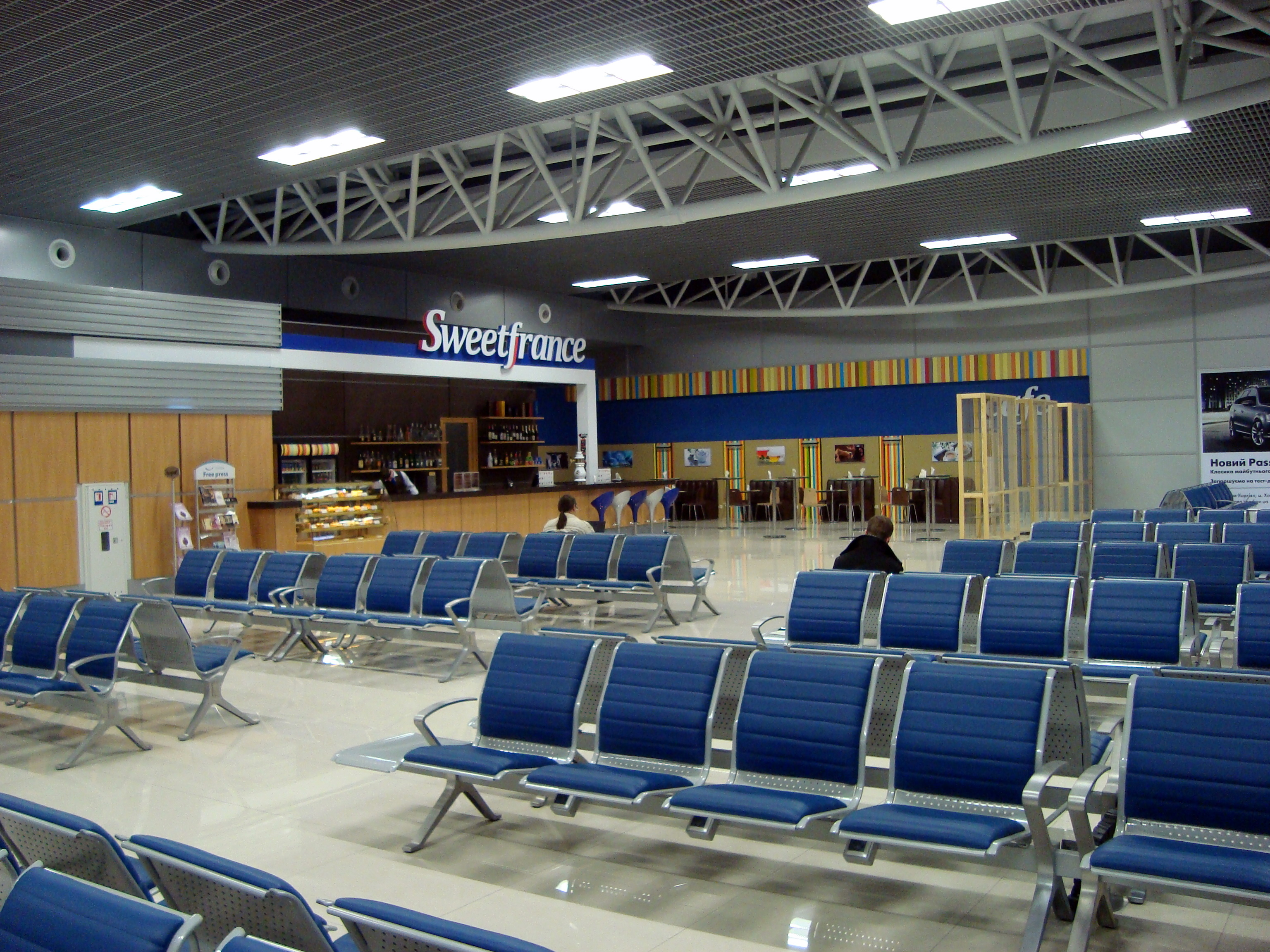
Interior of the airport after reconstruction

On August 28, 2010, a new terminal with an area of 20,000 square meters and a capacity of 650 passengers per hour was opened. Meanwhile, it was decided to reconstruct the old airport building, which now houses the VIP terminal. Special care was taken to preserve its retro style in order to honor the airport's history.

On December 1, 2010, ground handling operations were taken over by the Swiss company Swissport (which also services Boryspil International Airport). The company handles passenger check-in, bus transfers to aircraft, boarding stairs, weight and balance calculations, and aircraft loading control.

In 2011, a new 2,500-meter runway was commissioned, capable of accommodating all types of medium-haul aircraft and certain types of long-haul aircraft without restrictions. The runway is equipped to ICAO Category II standards, allowing Kharkiv Airport to receive flights in adverse weather conditions.

In 2012, the airport was equipped with two jet bridges and a new air traffic control tower.

In 2012, Kharkiv Airport successfully handled flights for football teams and fans during the UEFA Euro 2012 championship. On certain days, traffic was so high that the surface of the old runway was used for aircraft parking.

Since 2013, the airport has been equipped with a Category II instrument landing system (ILS).

In August 2013, the airport successfully welcomed an An-124 Ruslan, which possessed the largest maximum takeoff weight of 392 tons among all aircraft ever received by Kharkiv Airport.

On October 18, 2018, it was announced that the United States Federal Aviation Administration (FAA) had authorized flights to Kharkiv Airport, noting that the city was "located at a safe distance from the conflict zone," following a ban imposed in 2014 due to the proximity of military operations in the war in eastern Ukraine. The lifting of the restriction was facilitated by the safe operations of non-U.S. airlines on Black Sea routes.

On March 2, 2019, the airline SkyUp announced the opening of a base at Kharkiv Airport.

On February 24, 2022, following the full-scale Russian invasion of Ukraine, the airport temporarily suspended operations for the duration of martial law. Due to the threat of a Russian Airborne Forces, the airport was blocked.

The airport was shelled multiple times with multiple launch rocket systems (Grad, Uragan) and missiles.

== Facilities ==
=== Terminal A ===
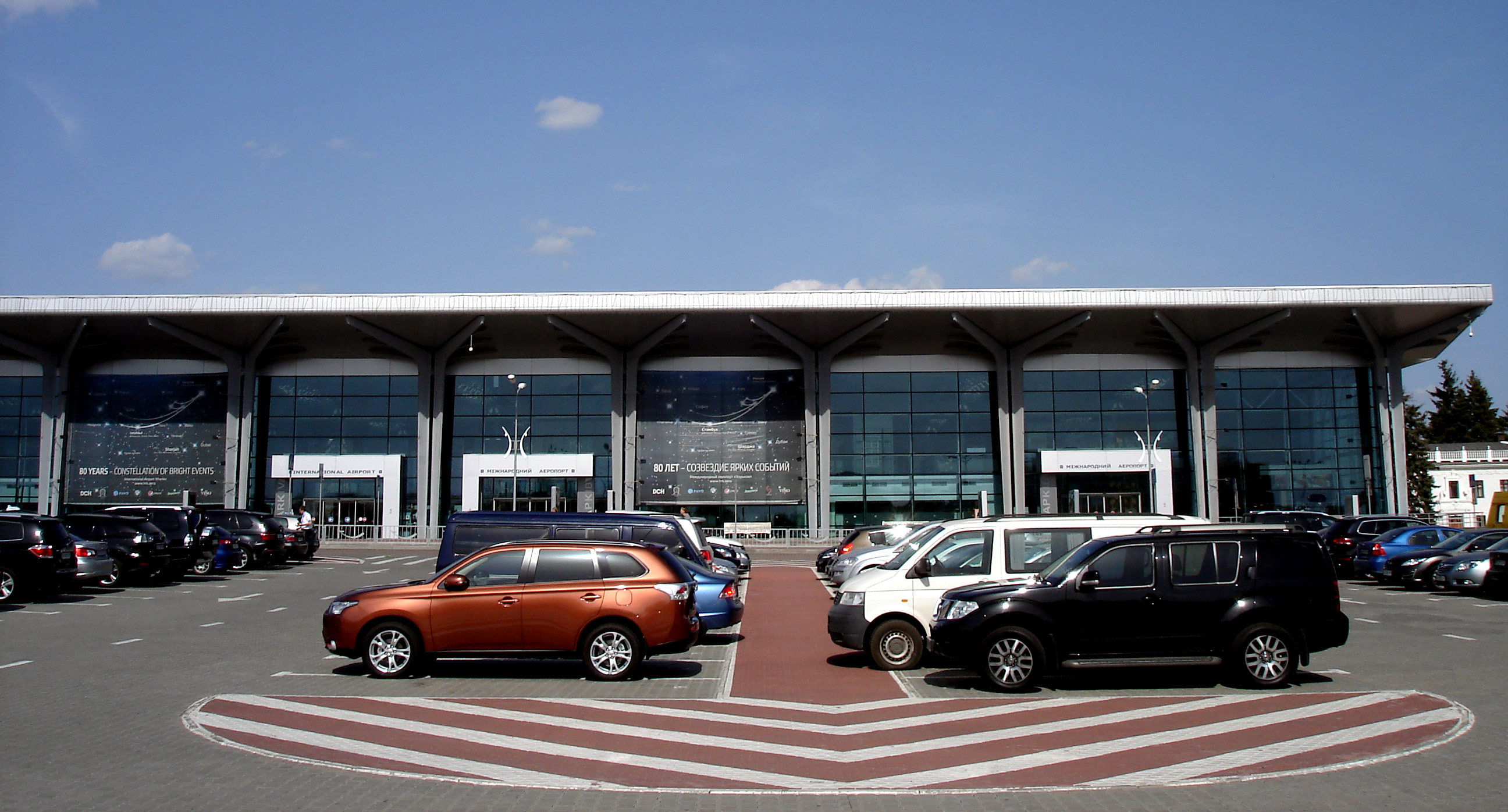
Terminal A (exterior)

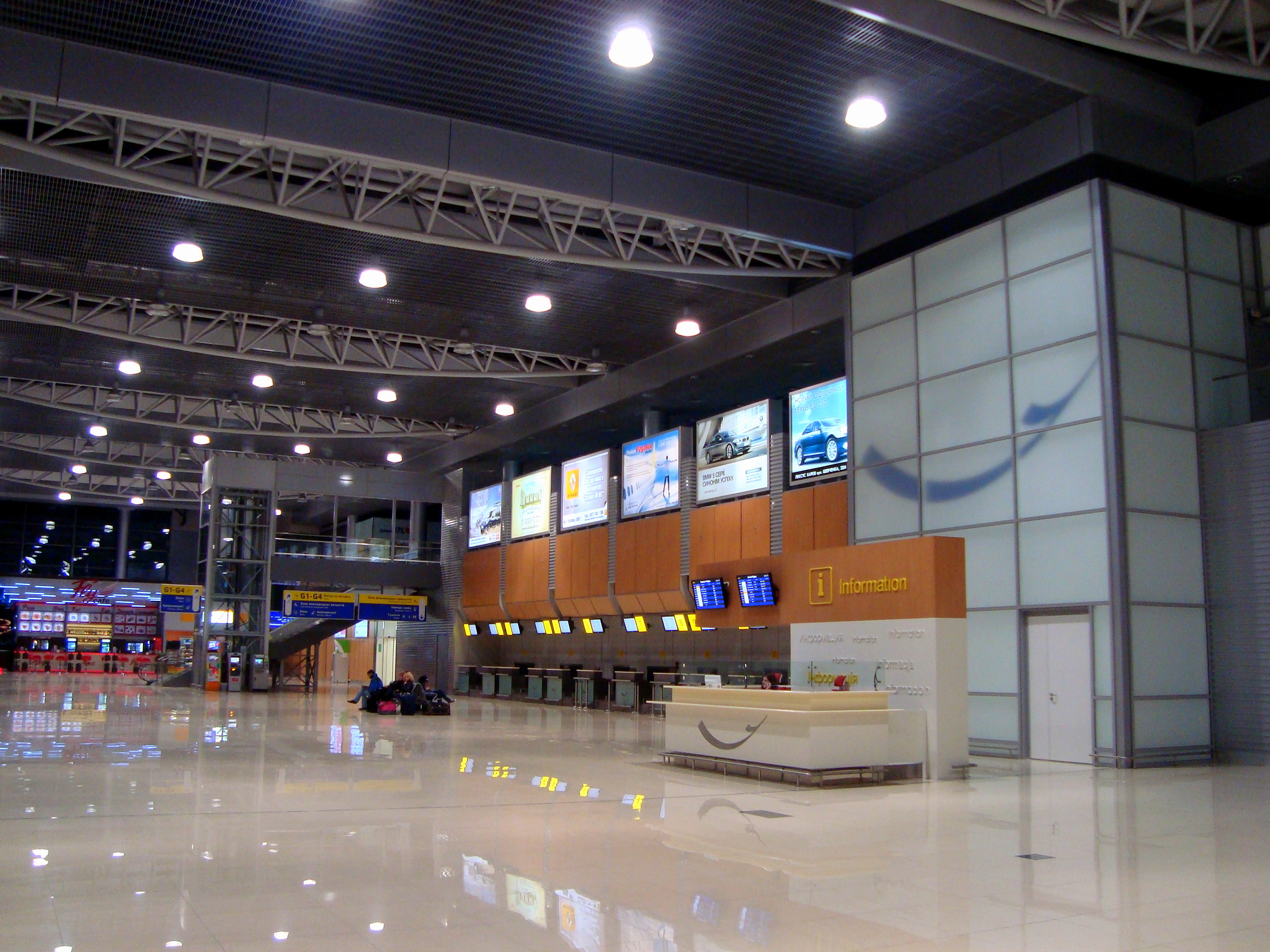
Terminal A (interior)

The terminal was opened on August 28, 2010, with Ukrainian President Viktor Yanukovych participating in the opening ceremony. On the day of its opening, the terminal already welcomed passengers arriving from Kyiv. According to Oleksandr Yaroslavsky, the new terminal was built in under two years. Overall, construction cost $80 million.

- Area: 20,000 m²
- Capacity: 650 passengers per hour
- Infrastructure: 18 check-in desks; 7 security/control checkpoints (5 for international departures, 2 for domestic departures); 7 boarding gates.

=== Terminal B ===
Terminal B

Terminal B is designed to serve VIP passengers, primarily private business aviation aircraft. It is located to the right of Terminal A. Terminal B occupies the old airport building, which was reconstructed and converted into a VIP passenger terminal. The terminal preserved its Stalinist architectural style, and the "Polyot" (Flight) restaurant, styled after the 1950s, was opened on its premises.

- Area: 2,000 m²
- Capacity: 250 passengers per hour
- Infrastructure: 1 check-in desk and 2 boarding gates.

=== Cargo Terminal ===
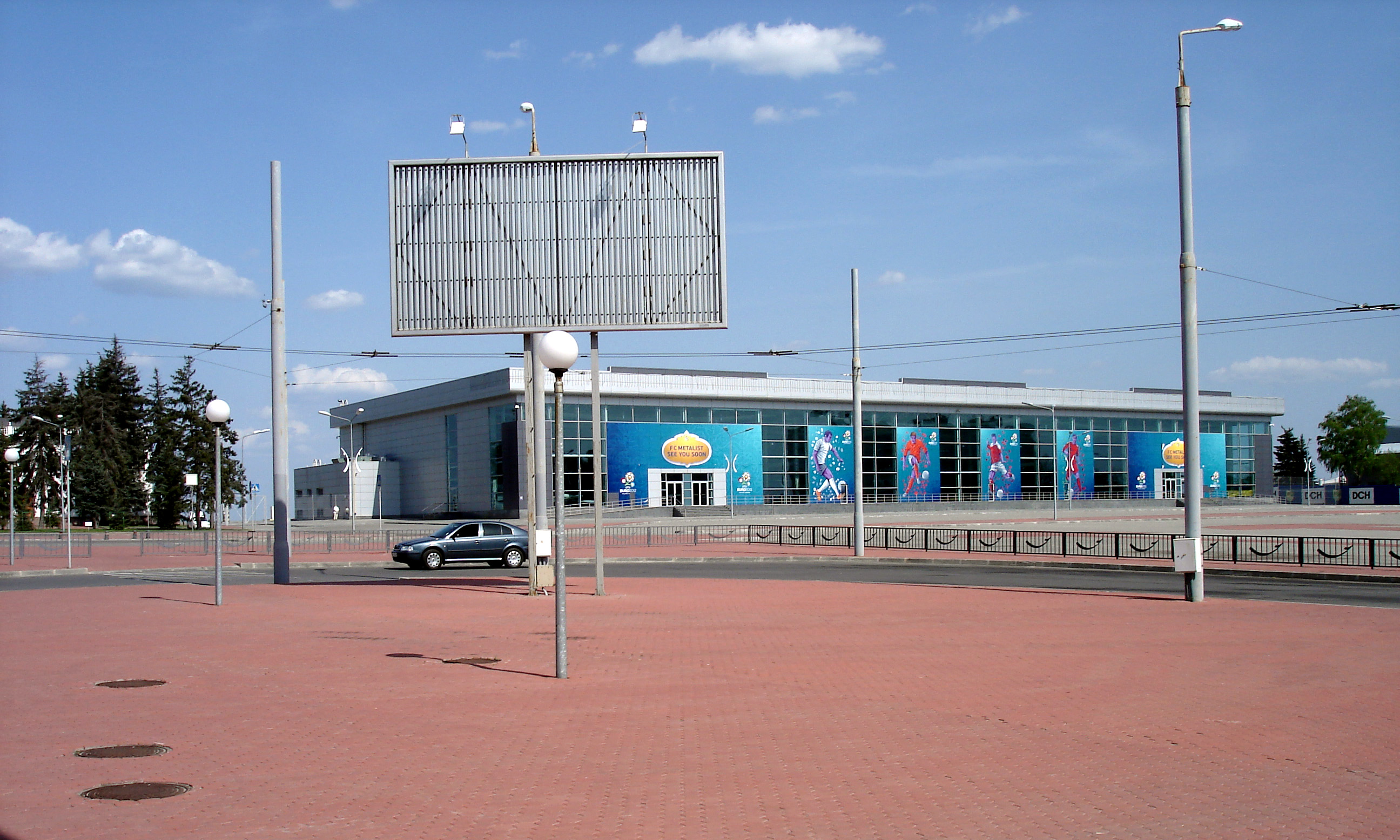
Aircraft hangar (Terminal C)

The terminal was originally built in the 1970s and fell into disrepair by the mid-1990s. The cargo terminal was subsequently restored and reopened in February 2014.

- Area: 1,100 m²
- Capacity: 10 tons per hour

== Airlines and destinations ==
The following airlines operate regular scheduled and charter flights at the airport:

As of 24 February 2022, all passenger flights have been suspended indefinitely.

Airlines	Destinations
LOT Polish Airlines	Warsaw–Chopin
Pegasus Airlines	Istanbul–Sabiha Gökçen; Seasonal: Bodrum
Skyline Express	Seasonal charter: Antalya, Dalaman, Sharm El Sheikh
SkyUp	Bratislava, Prague; Seasonal: Barcelona, Batumi, Burgas, Corfu, Larnaca, Odesa, Rimini, Tel Aviv, Tirana, Tivat; Seasonal charter: Antalya, Sharm El Sheikh
Turkish Airlines	Istanbul
Ukraine International Airlines	Kyiv–Boryspil, Tel Aviv; Seasonal charter: Antalya, Kayseri, Sharm El Sheikh

== Statistics ==
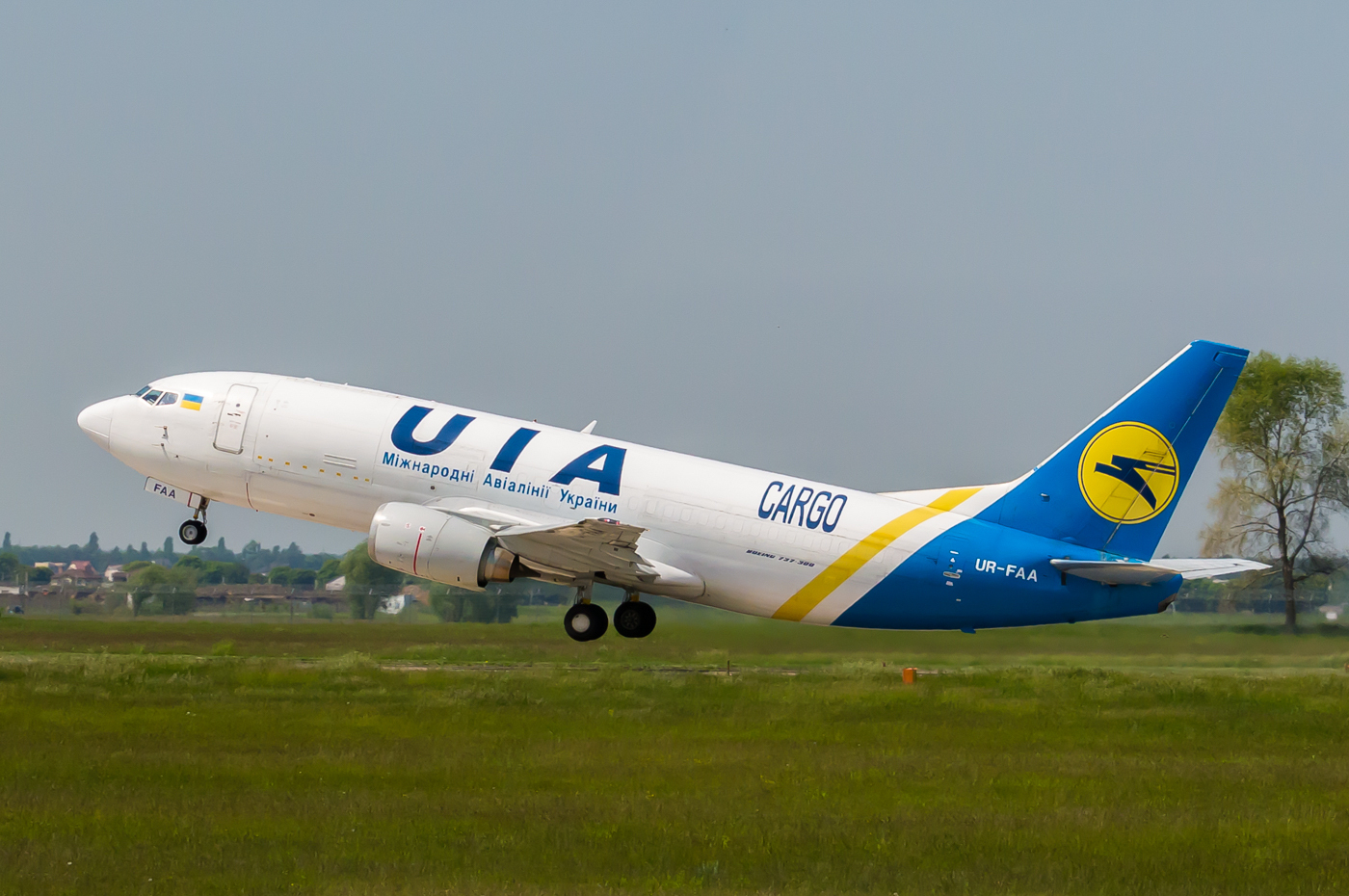
A Ukraine International Airlines Boeing 737-300F taking off

Kharkiv International Airport is one of Ukraine's major airports, with a capacity of over 1,700 passengers per hour. According to estimates by Airport Consulting Vienna, its potential passenger traffic reaches 4.5 million people per year.

The airport features a modern baggage handling system (BHS) with a processing capacity of 960 items per hour for international flights and 600 items per hour for domestic flights. A key feature of the BHS is its modularity, allowing for future expansion and the addition of check-in counters and arrival terminals. RESA, a leading provider of IT and telecommunications solutions for the aviation industry, supplied and fully integrated the information technology systems in the main terminal.

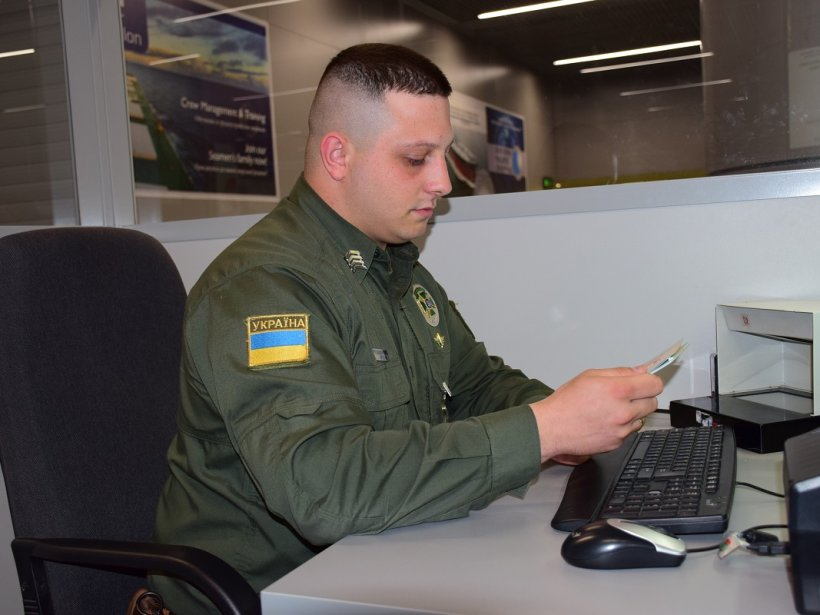
Ukrainian border guard at Kharkiv International Airport

The main terminal is equipped with adequate border control, customs, and aviation security checkpoints, as well as accessibility features for passengers with reduced mobility.

Year	Passengers	Change on previous year
2017	806,200	▲34.4%
2018	962,000	▲19.0%
2019	1,340,800	▲39.4%

== Ground transport ==
=== Road ===
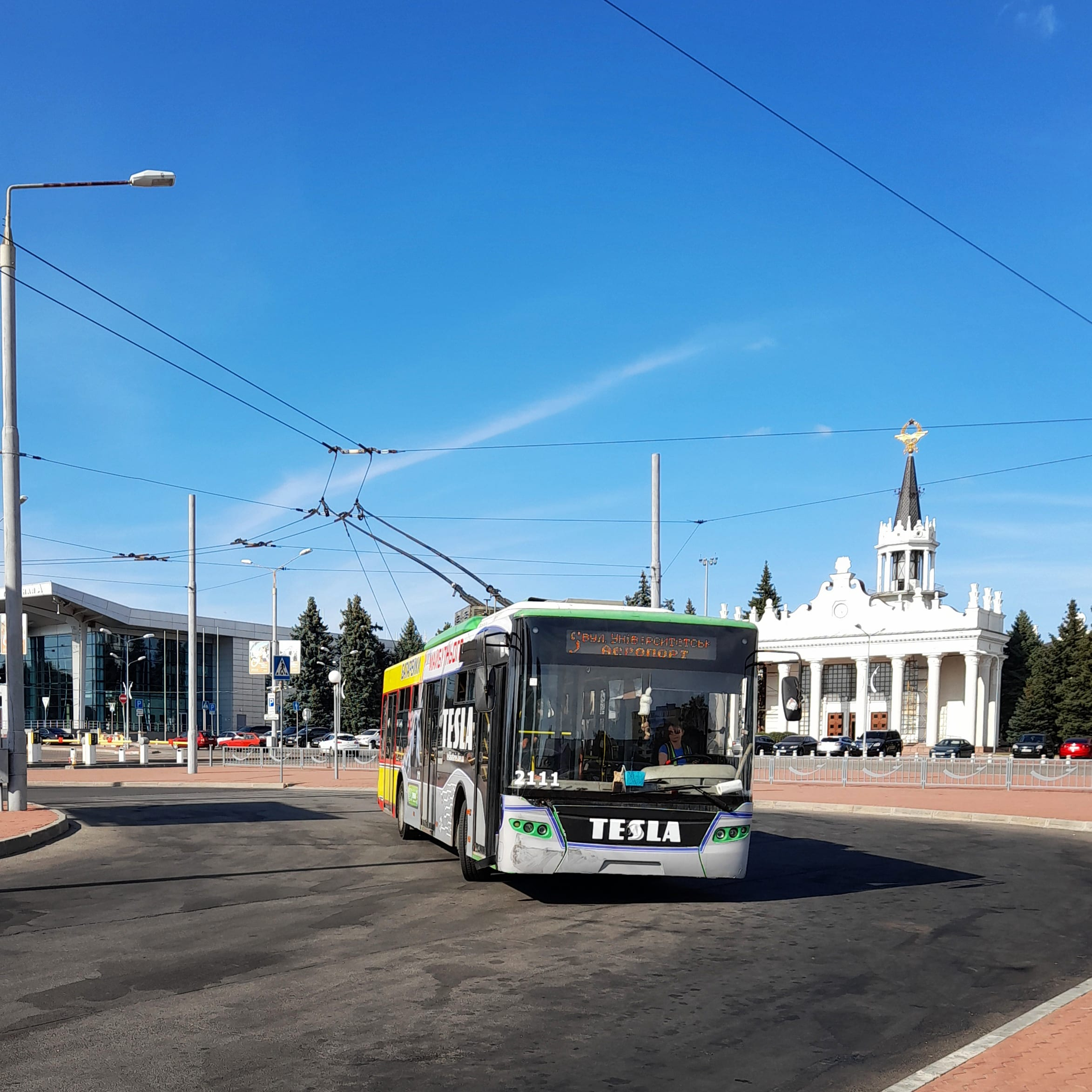
Trolleybus No. 5 at the turning loop near the airport

Kharkiv International Airport is well served by public transport and is connected to the city's wider road and rail network via Antonov Street and the M03 national highway. The following public transport routes operate between the airport and the city of Kharkiv:

- Trolleybus Line 5: Airport — Universytetska Street, with a transfer to Levada station ( Kholodnohirsko-Zavodska Line).
- Trolleybus Line 58: Airport — Peremohy Avenue, with transfers to Levada, Maidan Konstytutsii ( Kholodnohirsko-Zavodska Line), Universytet ( Saltivska Line), Derzhprom, Naukova, Botanichnyi Sad, 23 Serpnia, Oleksiivska, and Peremoha ( Oleksiivska Line) stations.
- Bus Line 115: Airport — Levada station ( Kholodnohirsko-Zavodska Line).
- Bus Line 119: Airport — Peremohy Avenue, with transfers to Levada, Maidan Konstytutsii ( Kholodnohirsko-Zavodska Line), Universytet ( Saltivska Line), Derzhprom, Naukova, Botanichnyi Sad, 23 Serpnia ( Oleksiivska Line) stations.
- Bus Line 152: Airport — 522nd Microdistrict, with a transfer to Akademika Barabashova station ( Saltivska Line).
- Bus Line 255: Airport — Akademika Barabashova station ( Saltivska Line).

As well as private bus routes. Car parking facilities at the airport itself are limited, but long-term parking can be found in the airport's immediate vicinity. Taxis can often be found waiting directly outside the terminal, in the passenger drop-off/pick-up area.

=== Rail ===
The airport is located approximately 8.6 kilometres (5.3 mi) by the main road route (via Aerospace Avenue) from Kharkiv-Levada railway station, a commuter rail stop, and 12 kilometres (7.5 mi) from Kharkiv-Passazhirskyi railway station, the city's main long-distance rail hub.

== See also ==
- List of airports in Ukraine
- List of the busiest airports in Ukraine
- List of the busiest airports in Europe
- List of the busiest airports in the former USSR
- Kharkiv North Airport
