= Universytet (Kharkiv Metro) =

Kharkiv Metro station

General information
- Coordinates: 50°0′15″N 36°14′8″E
- System: Kharkiv Metro Station
- Owner: Kharkiv Metro
- Line: Saltivska Line
- Platforms: 1
- Tracks: 2

Construction
- Structure type: underground
- Platform levels: 1

History
- Opened: 10 August 1984

Services
Preceding station	Kharkiv Metro	Following station
Istorychnyi Muzei Terminus	Saltivska Line	Yaroslava Mudroho towards Saltivska
Naukova towards Peremoha	Oleksiivska Line transfer at Derzhprom	Arkhitektora Beketova towards Metrobudivnykiv
Location

Universytet (Ukrainian: Університет,, lit. 'University') is a station on the Kharkiv Metro's Saltivska Line. The station was opened on 10 August 1984 and is located beneath the Maidan Svobody, at the time, the largest square in Europe and the second largest in the world after Tiananmen Square, in the centre of Kharkiv. The station is named after the Kharkiv National University, which is located on top of the square.

Up until 27 August 1991 the station was called Dzerzhynska according to the name of the square Ploshcha Dzerzhynskoho (Dzherzhinsky Square) after the founder of the Soviet Secret Police Felix Dzerzhinsky. It currently forms a complex with the adjacent station Derzhprom on the Oleksiivska Line.

The station is located deep underground and is a bi-level pillar-trispan with blank marble columns. The station's service rooms are located on one of the second level balconies, and the other balcony is used as an underground passenger transfer for when there are fairs and concerts on the Maidan Svobody. The underground transfer was once used for daily passenger usage during the 1980s, but was closed down during the early 1990s.

Cupolas with a diameter of six meters, each hanging 12 meters apart and weighing 120 tons, are incorporated into the ceiling, in which the station's chandeliers hang. The station itself is 13 meters in width, due to the transfer point to the Derzhprom station on the Oleksiivska Line. The transfer itself was supposed to include escalator access to passengers, but as there was an economic crisis in the country, the escalators were abandoned and replaced with regular stairs.

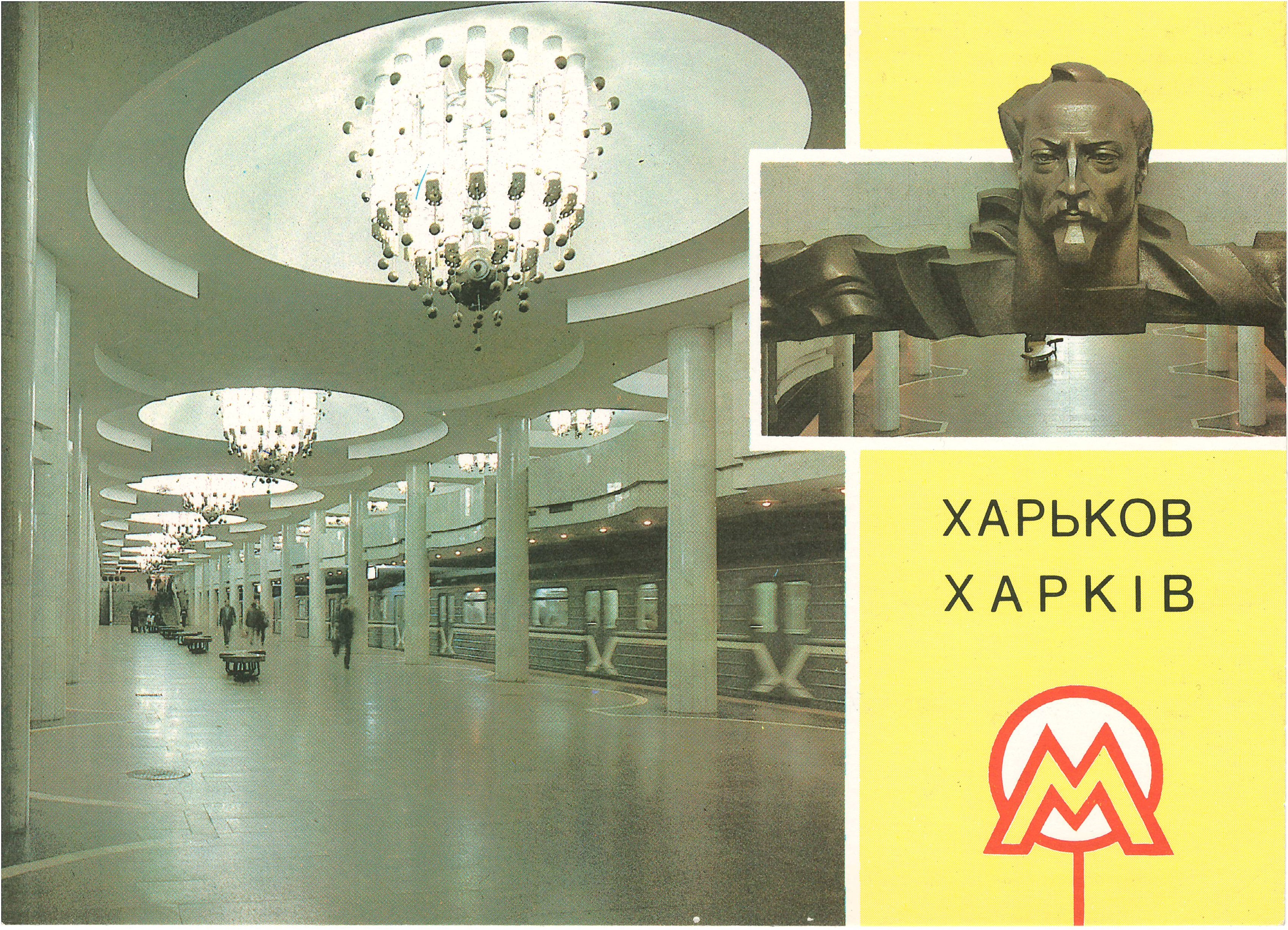
1986 postcard of the Ministry of Communications of the USSR with bust of Felix Dzerzhinsky

A large portrait of Felix Dzerzhinsky was located on the station which was later removed after the renovation of the station. Station vestibules are located on both ends of the station, which have been linked with a network of underground passenger tunnels which have many small shops.

In September 2023 a small school was created in the metro station so that education would continue during the bombing of Kharkiv in the Russian invasion of Ukraine.
