= Zakhysnykiv Ukrainy (Kharkiv Metro) =

Kharkiv Metro station

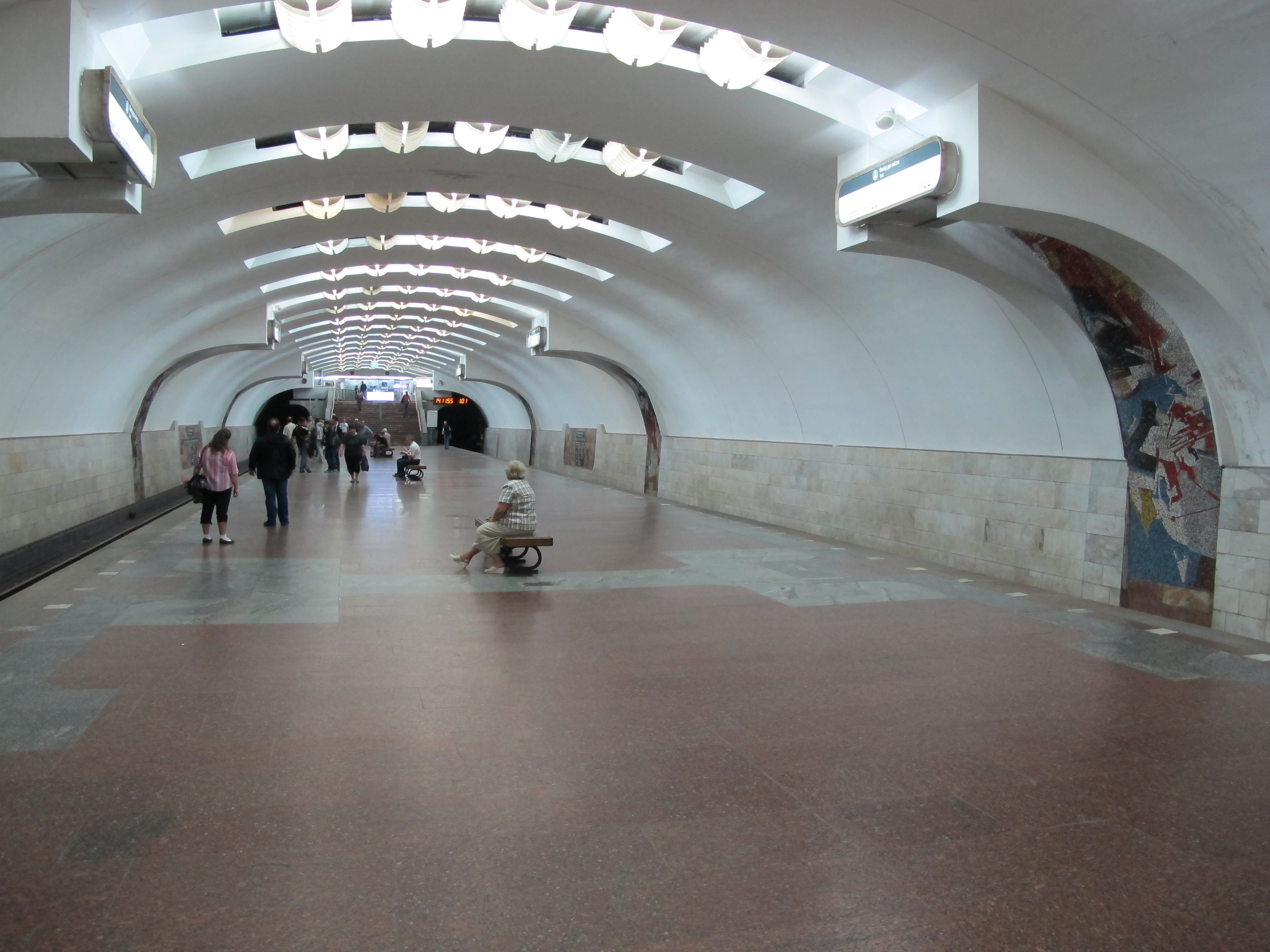
- The Station Hall

General information
- Coordinates: 49°59′19.01″N 36°15′53.19″E
- System: Kharkiv Metro Station
- Owner: Kharkiv Metro
- Line: Oleksiivska Line
- Platforms: 1
- Tracks: 2

Construction
- Structure type: underground
- Platform levels: 1

History
- Opened: 6 May 1995

Services
Preceding station	Kharkiv Metro	Following station
Arkhitektora Beketova towards Peremoha	Oleksiivska Line	Metrobudivnykiv Terminus
Location

Zakhysnykiv Ukrainy (Ukrainian: Захисників України,, lit. 'Defenders of Ukraine') is a station on the Kharkiv Metro's Oleksiivska Line. The station opened on 6 May 1995.

Prior to 17 May 2016, the station's name was Ploshcha Povstannia (Площа Повстання, lit. 'Rebellion Square'. It was renamed to conform with the law banning Communist names in Ukraine.
