= Naukova (Kharkiv Metro) =

Kharkiv Metro station

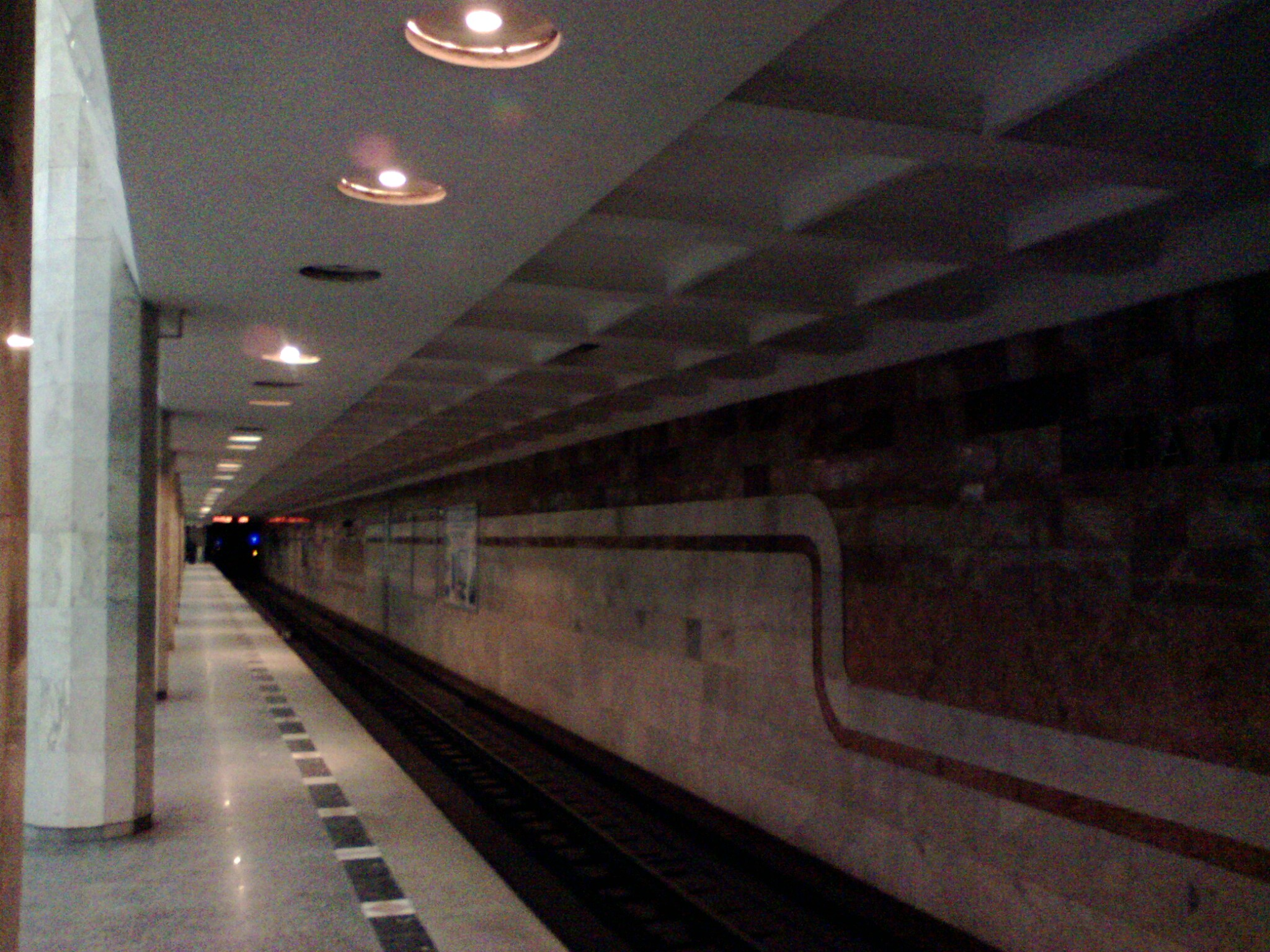
- The Station Hall

General information
- Coordinates: 50°0′46.95″N 36°13′36.62″E
- System: Kharkiv Metro Station
- Owner: Kharkiv Metro
- Line: Oleksiivska Line
- Platforms: 1
- Tracks: 2

Construction
- Structure type: underground
- Platform levels: 1

History
- Opened: 6 May 1995

Services
Preceding station	Kharkiv Metro	Following station
Botanichnyi Sad towards Peremoha	Oleksiivska Line	Derzhprom towards Metrobudivnykiv
Location

Naukova (Ukrainian: Наукова,) is a station on the Kharkiv Metro's Oleksiivska Line.

== History ==
The station was opened on May 6, 1995. The project at the time was called "Lenin Avenue" which was also the name of a major and popular road in Kharkiv. The current name of this street is "Naukova Street"; "Naukova" - which means "Scientific" - because of the large number of educational institutions and research institutes in the area of exits from the station.

Before the launch of the second stage of the Oleksiivska Line on August 21, 2004, it was the terminus, and also near the entrance to the metro there was a terminal stop for trolleybuses (lines No. 8, No. 38), (No. 2 - Unfolded on Danilevsky Street). After the opening of the metro stations "Botanichnyi Sad", "23 Serpnia", "Oleksiivska" and "Peremoha" route 2 was extended to Oleksiivska, and trolleybus routes 8 and 38 were canceled.

== Description ==
It is a column-type station, shallow, with two lobbies. The bunk, and second floor balconies are supported by columns. Balconies and columns are faced with white marble. The walls around the train tracks are brown.

Naukova (also called Nauchnaya in Russian) is one of the three stations of the Kharkiv metro line with a two-tiered hall (similar to the Universitet and Peremoha stations). Access to the second floor is from the metro workers' lobbies, on both sides there are service rooms.

Two notable establishments around this metro station are the Kharkiv National University of Radioelectronics and a popular McDonald's eatery.
