= Oleksiivka =

Oleksiivka or Oleksiivska may refer to:

- Oleksiivska line or Line 3, a line of the Kharkiv Metro, Ukraine
  - Oleksiivska (Kharkiv Metro), a station on the line
- Oleksiivka, Volnovakha Raion, Donetsk Oblast, Ukraine
- Oleksiivka, Khotin Hromada, Sumy Raion, Sumy Oblast, Ukraine
- Oleksiivka, Bilhorod-Dnistrovskyi Raion, Odesa Oblast, Ukraine
