= Derzhprom (Kharkiv Metro) =

Kharkiv Metro station

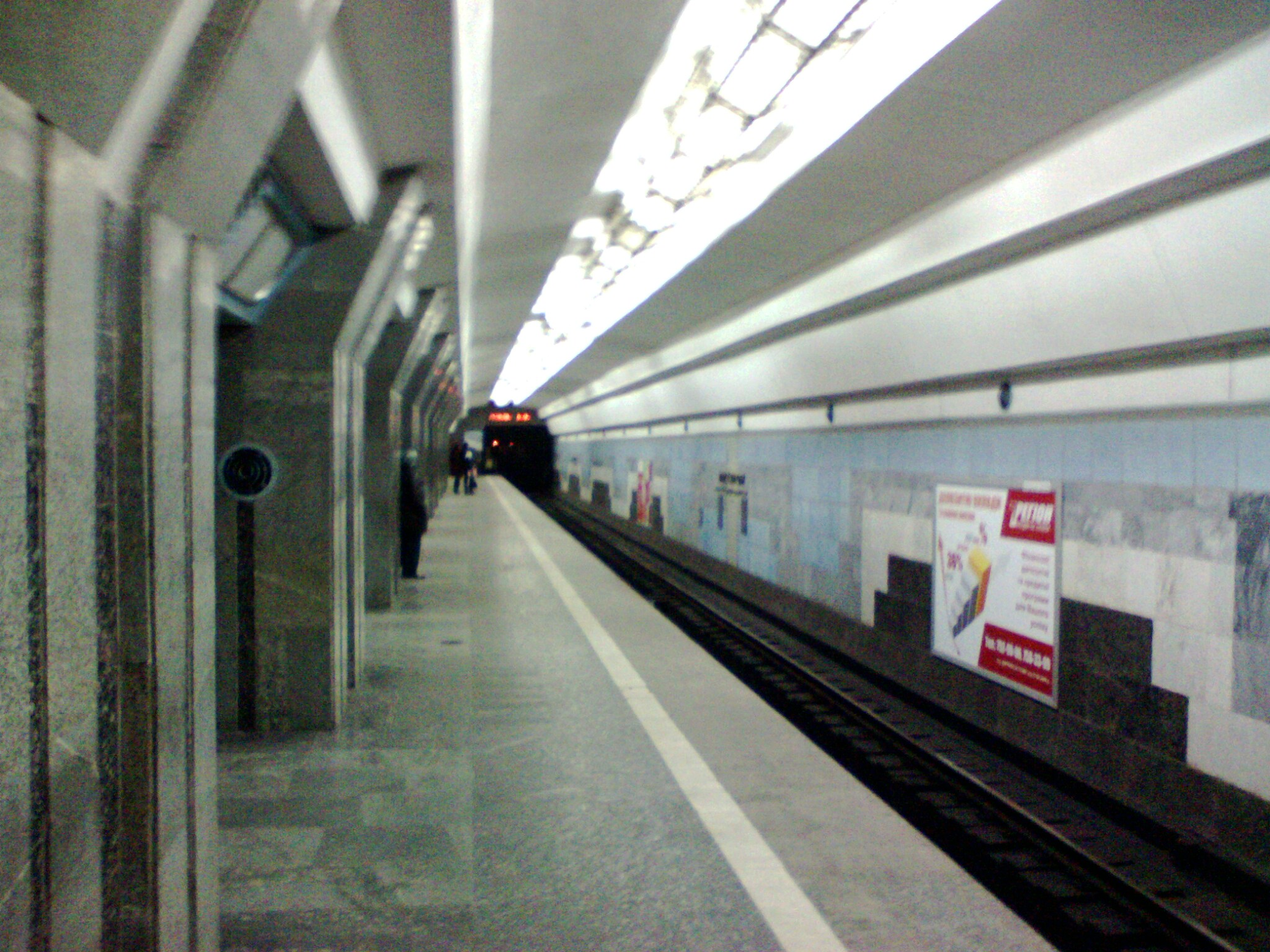
- The Station Hall

General information
- Coordinates: 50°0′21.51″N 36°13′52.37″E
- System: Kharkiv Metro Station
- Owner: Kharkiv Metro
- Line: Oleksiivska Line
- Platforms: 1
- Tracks: 2

Construction
- Structure type: underground
- Platform levels: 1

History
- Opened: 6 May 1995

Services
Preceding station	Kharkiv Metro	Following station
Naukova towards Peremoha	Oleksiivska Line	Arkhitektora Beketova towards Metrobudivnykiv
Istorychnyi Muzei Terminus	Saltivska Line transfer at Universytet	Yaroslava Mudroho towards Saltivska
Location

Derzhprom (Ukrainian: Держпром,) is a station on the Kharkiv Metro's Oleksiivska Line. The station opened on 6 May 1995. It is named after Derzhprom, a constructivist building on Freedom Square.
