= Botanichnyi Sad (Kharkiv Metro) =

Kharkiv Metro station

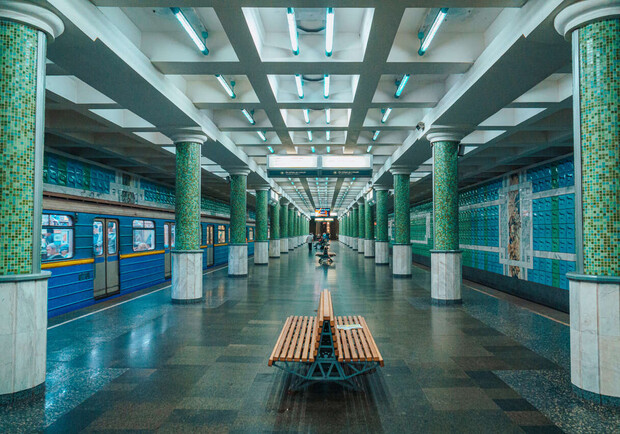
- The central hall of the Botanichnyi Sad station

General information
- Coordinates: 50°1′38″N 36°13′23″E
- System: Kharkiv Metro Station
- Owner: Kharkiv Metro
- Line: Oleksiivska Line
- Platforms: 1
- Tracks: 2

Construction
- Structure type: underground
- Platform levels: 1

History
- Opened: 21 August 2004

Services
Preceding station	Kharkiv Metro	Following station
23 Serpnia towards Peremoha	Oleksiivska Line	Naukova towards Metrobudivnykiv
Location

Botanichnyi Sad (Ukrainian: Ботанічний сад,, lit. 'Botanical Garden') is a station on the Kharkiv Metro's Oleksiivska Line. The station is one of two new stations added to the metro system on 21 August 2004, the other one being 23 Serpnia.

The station is located under the Nauky Avenue (formerly the Lenin Avenue) in the northern part of Kharkiv's city center. The station's name and architectural design recalls the surrounding botanical garden of the Kharkiv University.

== History ==
Plans for the construction of the Botanichnyi Sad metro station were first drawn out in the mid-90s. At first, dates for the station's opening were set at 1995, then 1996, and later in 1997. However, due to the difficult financial situation, the station's construction was delayed, and it was opened only in August 2004, during the celebration of the 350-years of Kharkiv.

== Construction ==
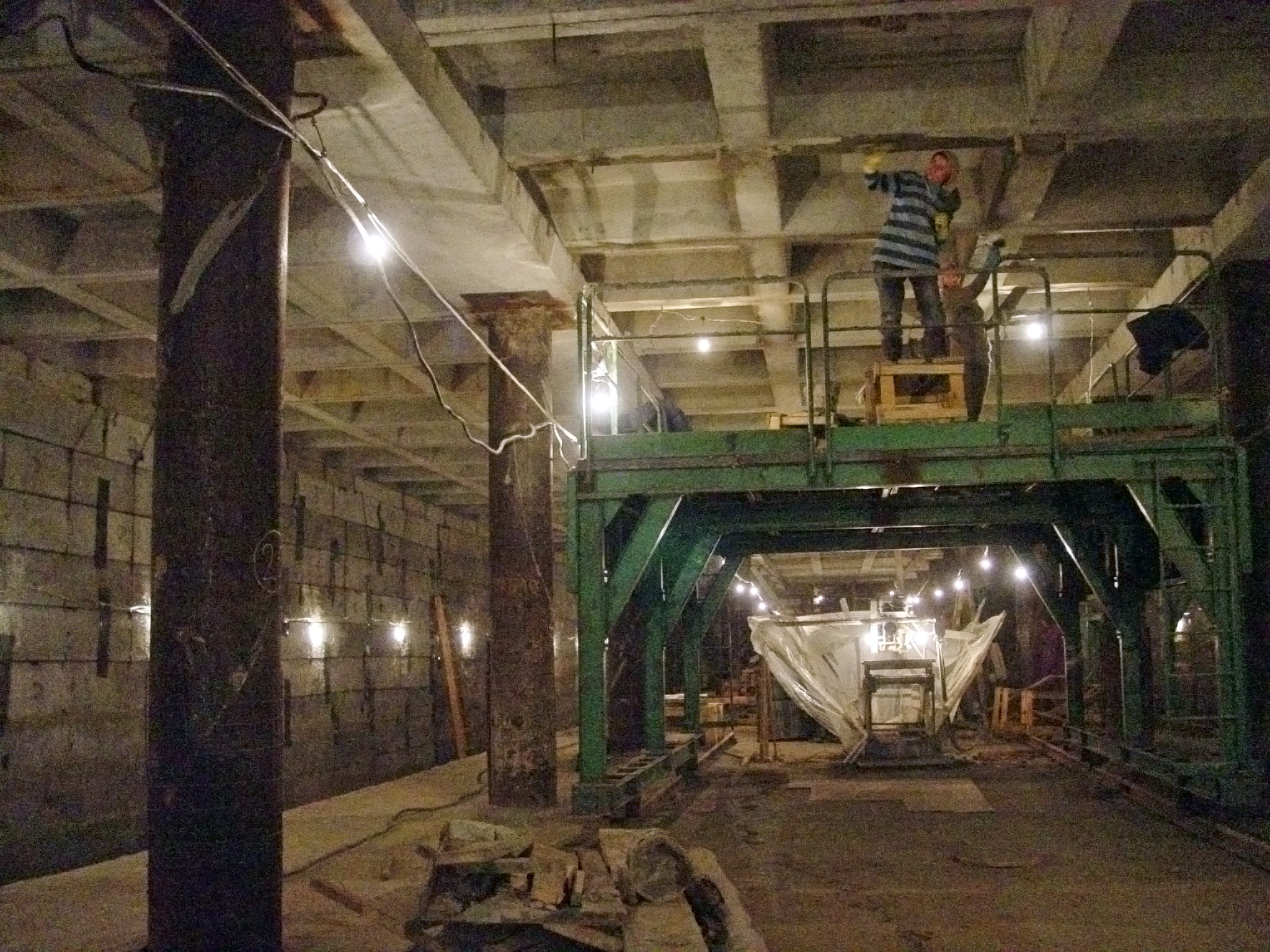
Work on the station during construction in 2003

Like the nearby Naukova station, Botanichnyi Sad was built with the open construction method, where earth is dug up, the station is constructed, and then covered up again. Initially, the station was supposed to be an above ground station, with a metro bridge crossing the Sarzhyn Yar, a popular recreation place for residents of Kharkiv. The top level of bridge was to hold the Lenin Prospect and the bottom — the station and railway tracks itself. However, the plan was scrapped because the plant environment surrounding the bridge could be destroyed.

== Architecture and design ==
Botanichnyi Sad lies shallow underground and consists of a central platform with round columns supporting the ceiling. The station's walls have been covered with green and blue tiles, with reliefs depicting greenery and plants. The columns are covered with light green mosaic tiles with white marble tiles near the bottom. The station's floor is paved with gray-coloured slabs of polished granite.

Two underground ticket vestibules serve the station, located on either side of the station. The northern vestibule has four exits which lead passengers to the intersection of the Nauky Avenue and Otakara Yarosha Street. The southern vestibule's exit leads directly into the botanical park.
