= Arkhitektora Beketova (Kharkiv Metro) =

Kharkiv Metro station

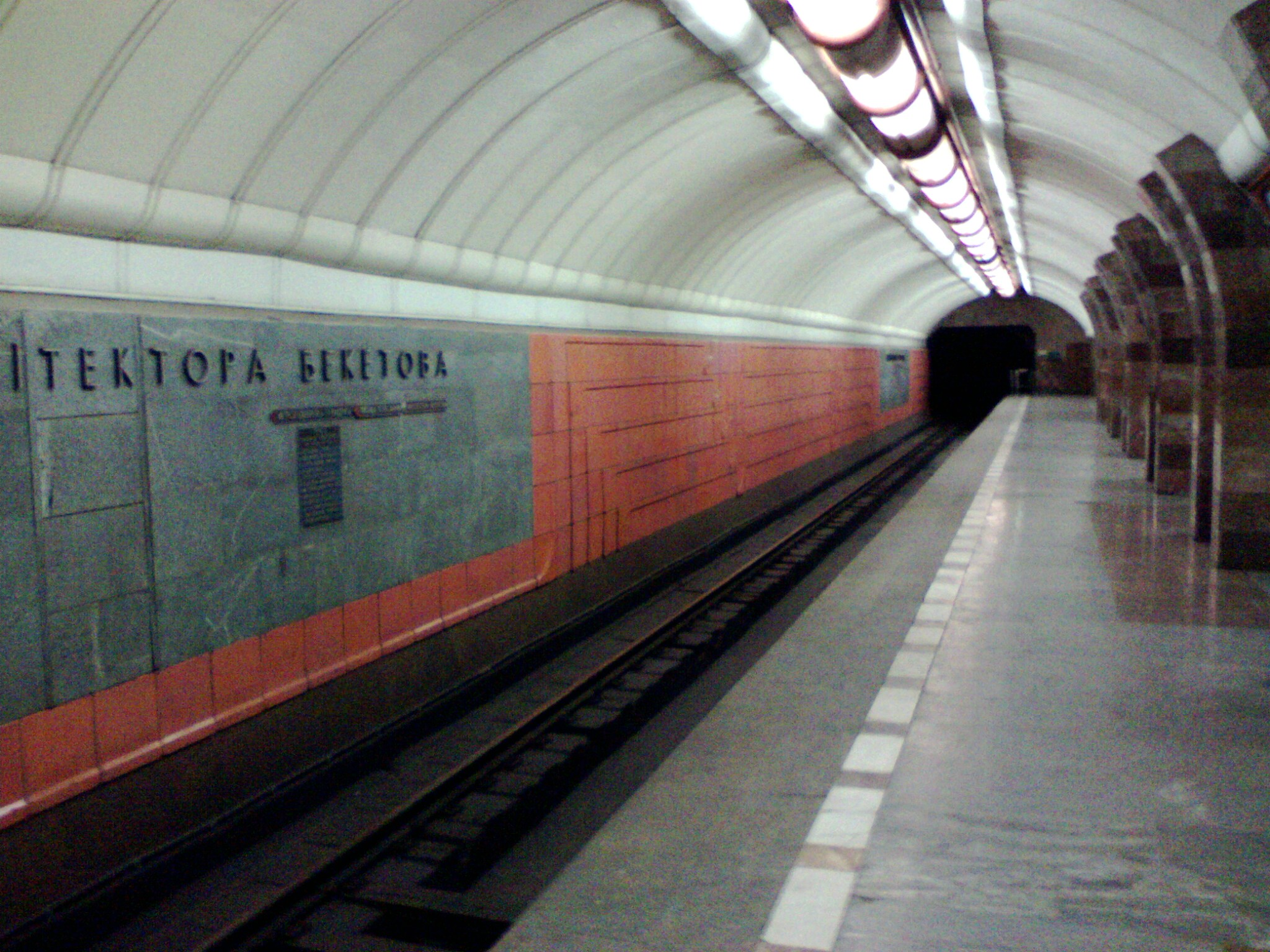
- Station platform

General information
- Coordinates: 49°59′54.57″N 36°14′24.47″E
- System: Kharkiv Metro Station
- Owner: Kharkiv Metro
- Line: Oleksiivska Line
- Platforms: 1
- Tracks: 2

Construction
- Structure type: underground
- Platform levels: 1

History
- Opened: 6 May 1995

Services
Preceding station	Kharkiv Metro	Following station
Derzhprom towards Peremoha	Oleksiivska Line	Zakhysnykiv Ukrainy towards Metrobudivnykiv
Location

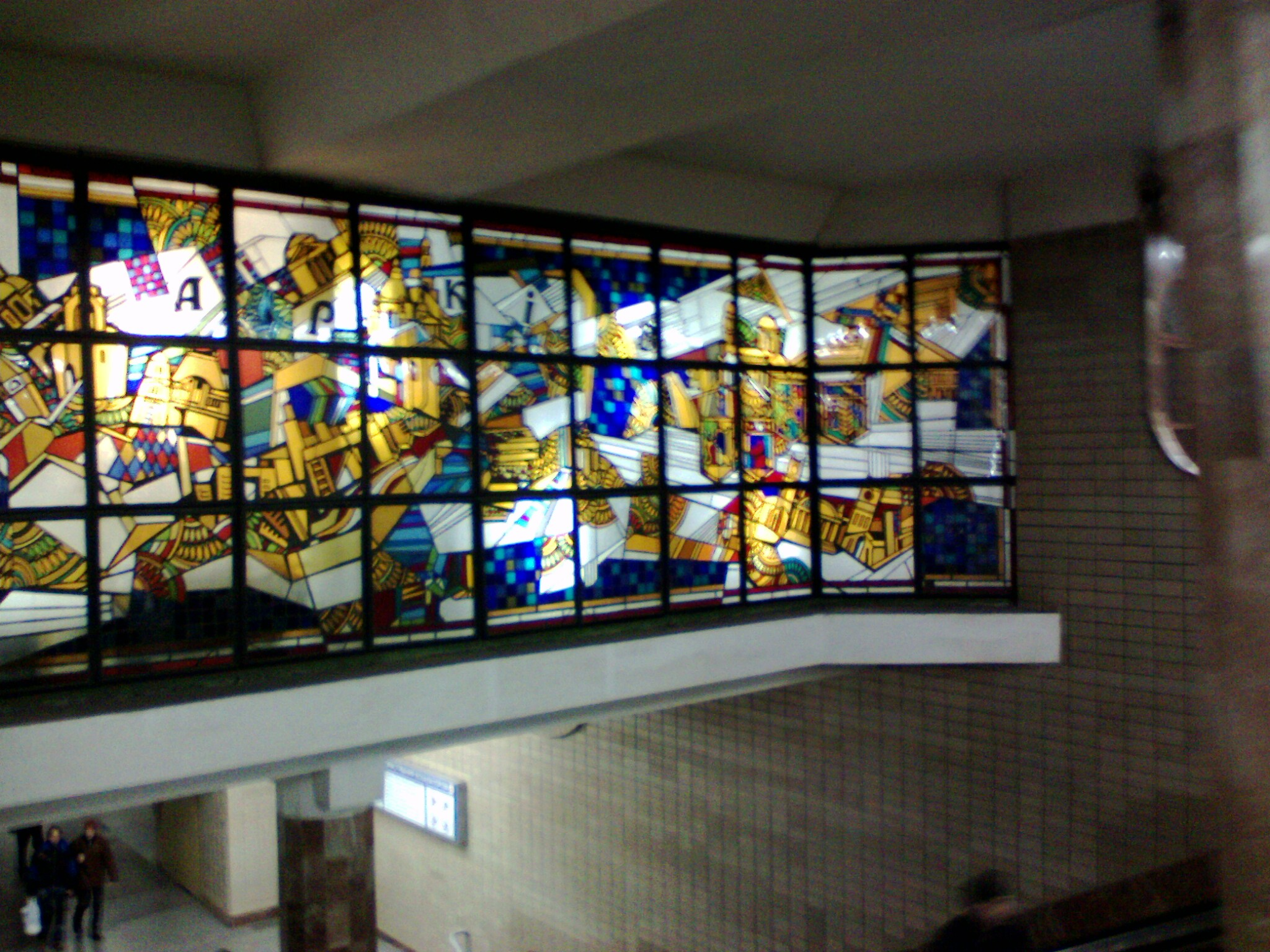
Element of the station's design

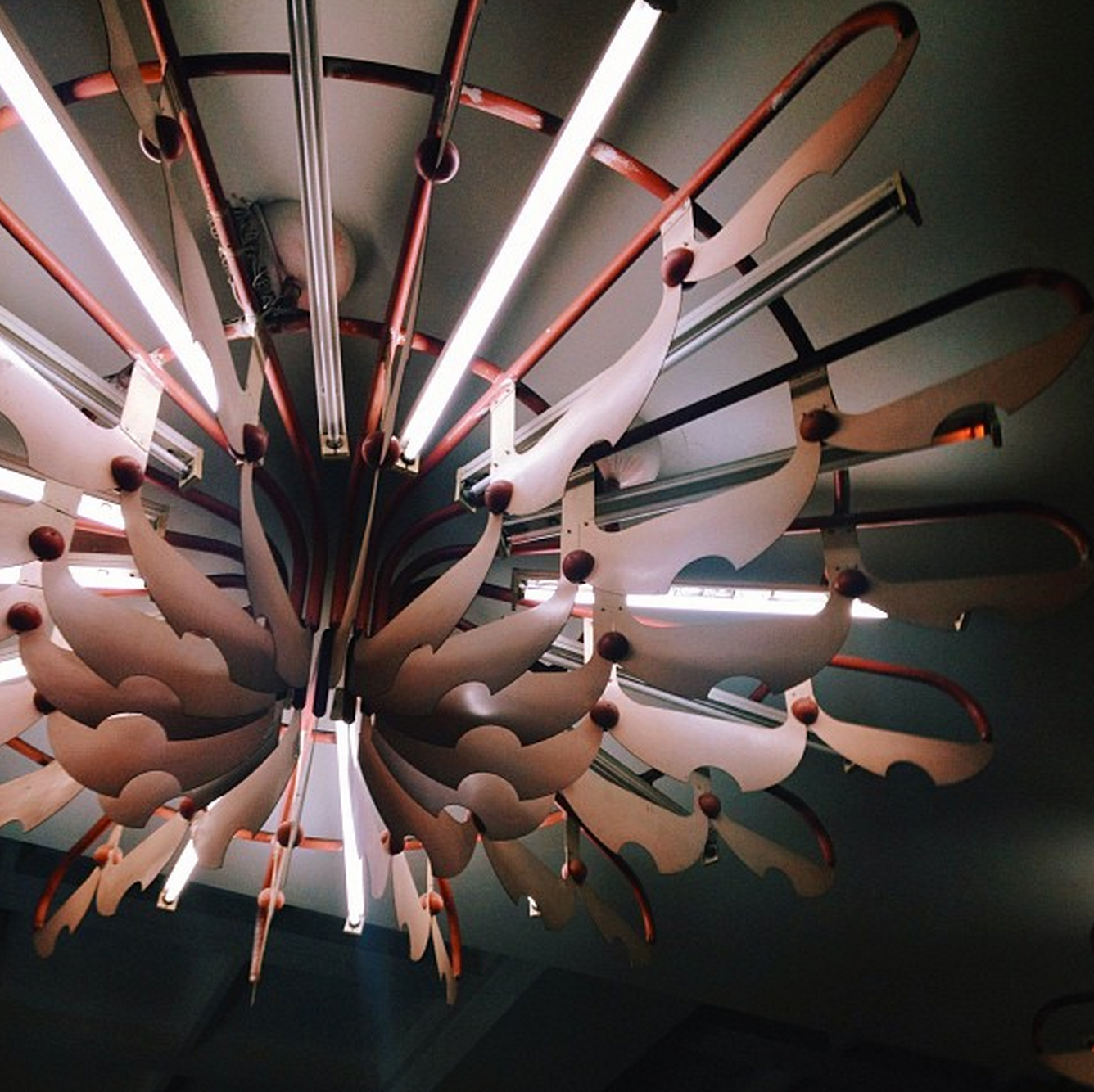
An art deco light fixture in the station

Arkhitektora Beketova (Ukrainian: Архітектора Бекетова,) is a station on the Kharkiv Metro's Oleksiivska Line. The station opened on 6 May 1995.

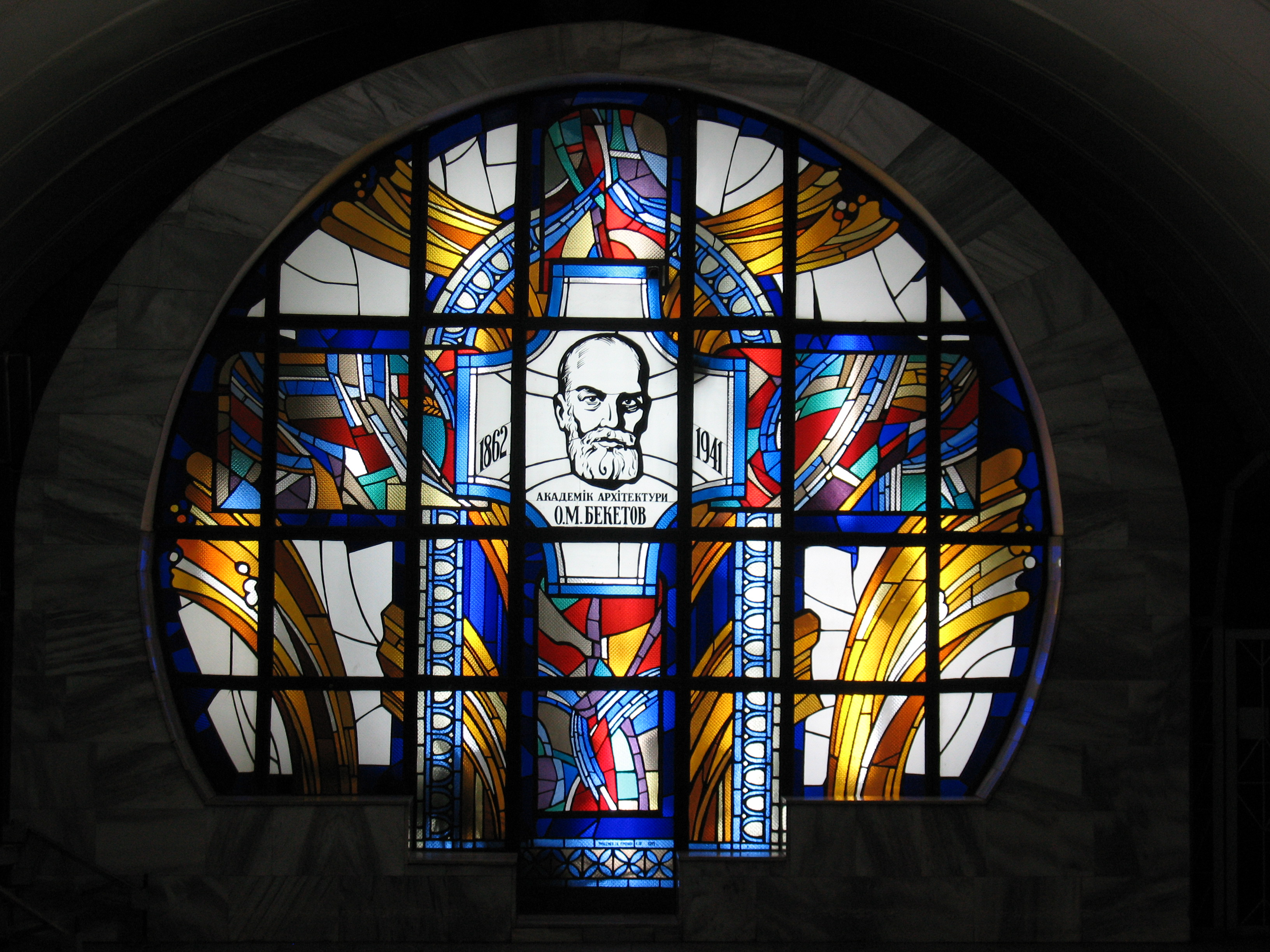
Stained glass panel, with a drawing of Oleksiy Beketov
