= 23 Serpnia (Kharkiv Metro) =

Kharkiv Metro station

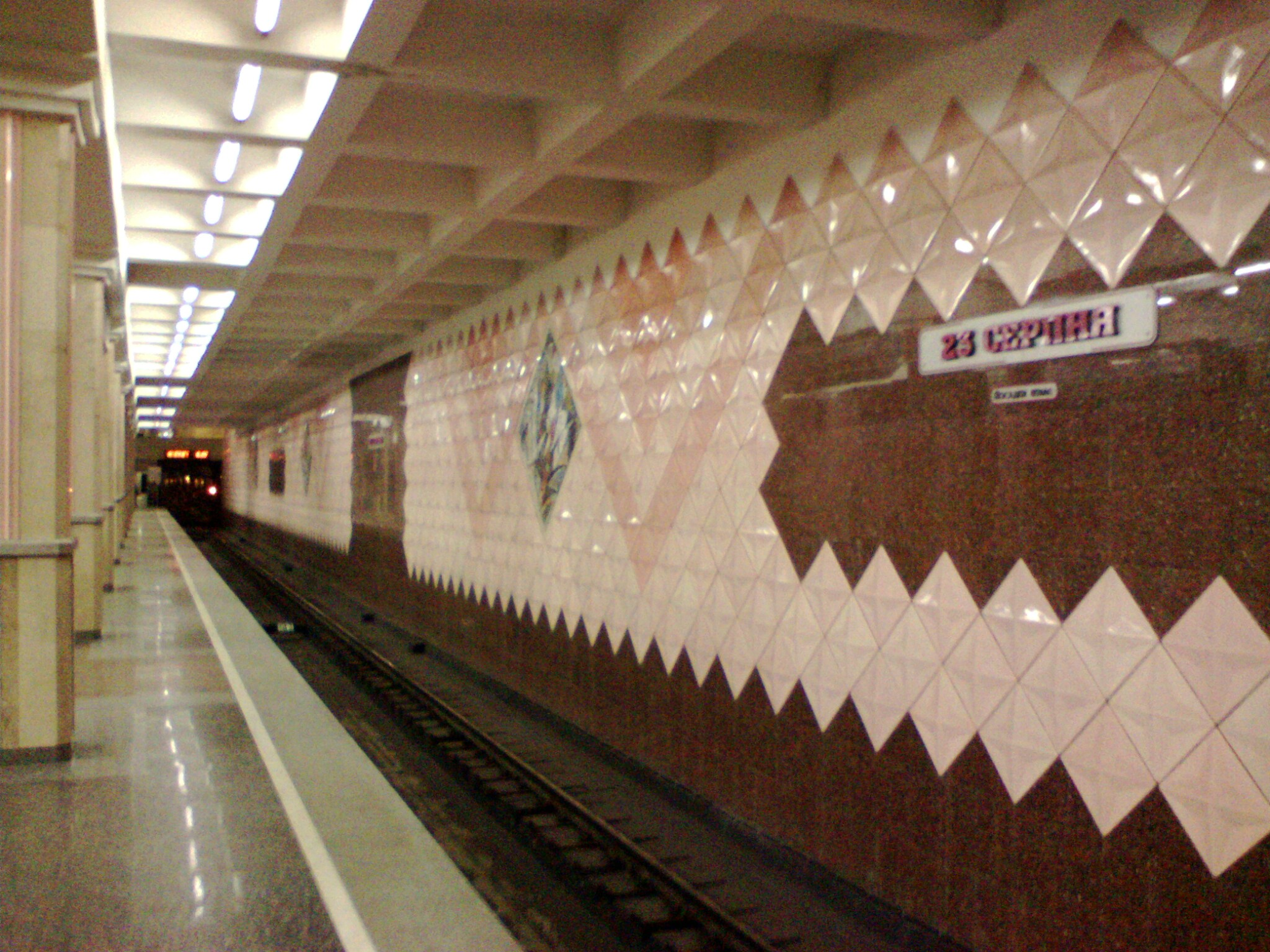

General information
- Coordinates: 50°2′4.72″N 36°13′13.29″E
- System: Kharkiv Metro Station
- Owner: Kharkiv Metro
- Line: Oleksiivska Line
- Platforms: 1
- Tracks: 2

Construction
- Structure type: underground
- Platform levels: 1

History
- Opened: 21 August 2004

Services
Preceding station	Kharkiv Metro	Following station
Oleksiivska towards Peremoha	Oleksiivska Line	Botanichnyi Sad towards Metrobudivnykiv
Location

23 Serpnia (Ukrainian: 23 Серпня, romanized: Dvadtsiat-Tretioho Serpnia,) is a station on the Kharkiv Metro's Oleksiivska Line. The station is one of two new stations added to the metro system on 21 August 2004, the other being Botanichnyi Sad.
