= Line 3 (Kharkiv Metro) =

Metro line in Kharkiv, Ukraine

Oleksiivska line
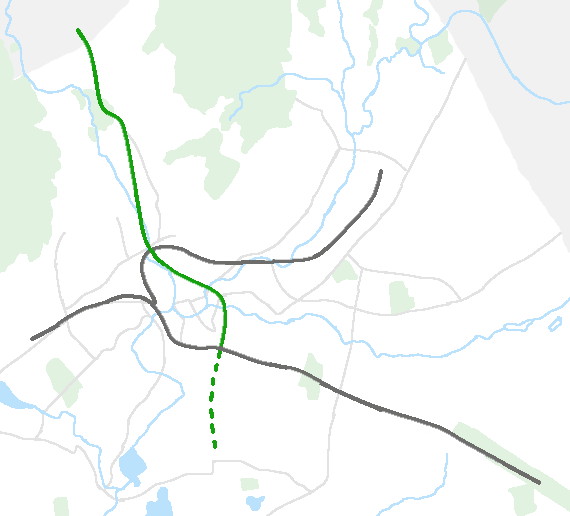

Overview
- Status: Operational
- Locale: Kharkiv, Ukraine
- Termini: Peremoha; Metrobudivnykiv
- Stations: 9

Service
- Type: Rapid transit
- System: Kharkiv Metro
- Operator: Kharkivskyi metropoliten
- Rolling stock: 81-717/714, 81-718/719
- Daily ridership: 141,150 (daily)

History
- Opened: 6 May 1995; 31 years ago
- Last extension: 2016

Technical
- Line length: 11.1 kilometres (6.9 mi)
- Track gauge: 5 ft (1,524 mm)

The Oleksiivska line (Ukrainian: Олексіївська лінія; Russian: Алексеевская линия) is the third and newest line of the Kharkiv Metro that was opened in 1995. The Oleksiivska line is the second longest in the system at 9.9 kilometres (6.2 mi) and contains a total of nine stations, with Peremoha being the last one opened on 19 August 2016.

The line cuts the city of Kharkiv, the second largest city in Ukraine, on a northeast–southwest axis. The Oleksiivska line is third behind the Saltivska line with a daily ridership of 141,150 passengers. Work to expand the Oleksiivska line past its southern terminus, at Metrobudivnykiv, started in late 2015 and is expected to be completed in the early 2020s.

== History ==
=== Timeline ===
Segment	Date opened	Stations	Length (Note: Approximate length, includes only operational passenger track length, does not include service track length.)
Metrobudivnykiv–Naukova	May 6, 1995	5	5.2 km
Botanichnyi Sad–23 Serpnia	August 21, 2004	2	2.5 km
Oleksiivska station	December 21, 2010	1	2.4 km
Peremoha station	August 19, 2016	1	1.2 km
Total:		9 stations	11.1 km

=== Name changes ===
There has been only one name change on the Oleksiivska line after the station was opened: Metrobudivelnyky (1995–2000) → Metrobudivnykiv imeni H.I. Vashchenka (2000–2016) → Metrobudivnykiv. The Peremoha station project was originally named Prospekt Peremohy during the early planning stages until the name was decided upon the current one.

== Stations ==
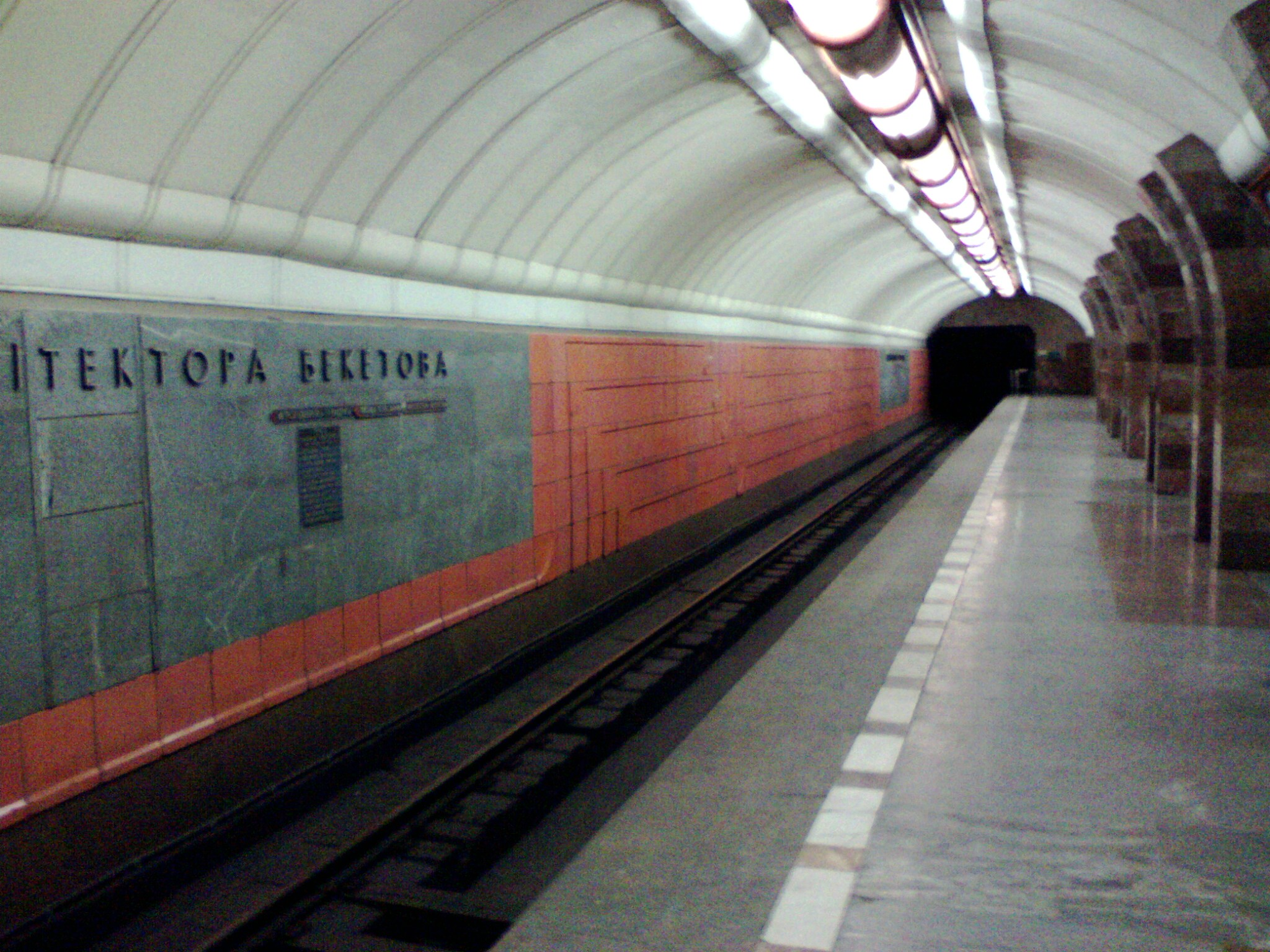
The Arkhitektora Beketova station's platform.

Six of the Oleksiivska line stations were built close to the surface, with only the Derzhprom and Arkhitektora Beketova stations constructed deep underground. Five of the shallow stations consist of a central platform and vaulted ceiling supported by columns, with another one being a single-vault station, having a vaulted roof with no ceiling support. The two deep stations are both pylon stations, in which the central hall is separated by arcades leading to the station platforms.

=== Transfers ===
Following the traditional Soviet metro planning, the third line (Oleksiivska line) is crossed by two other line segments at high traffic locations. Currently, the Oleksiivska line has two transfer stations with the Kholodnohirsko–Zavodska line (red line) and the Saltivska line (blue line):

#	Transfer to	At	Opened
	Sportyvna (Kholodnohirsko–Zavodska line)	Metrobudivnykiv	May 6, 1995
	Universytet (Saltivska line)	Derzhprom	May 6, 1995

== Technical specifications ==
Just like with the Kyiv Metro, government planning agencies allowed for a maximum of five carriage trains that would fit on the 100 metres (330 ft) station platforms without any modification to the station structure. Specifically, 12 five-carriage trains are assigned to serve the Oleksiivska line, served by the Depot-1 "Moskovske" from the Kholodnohirsko-Zavodska line. The Oleksiivkska line connects to the Kholodnohirsko-Zavodska line with a service link between the Metrobudivnykiv and Levada stations. A new depot will be constructed specifically for the Oleksiivska line, located immediately north of the Peremoha station.

Currently, trains of the 81-717/714 and 81-718/719 models are operating on the Oleksiivska line.

== Future extension ==
Since the 2010 opening of the Oleksiivska station, the Oleksiivska line became the second longest line segment of the system. To follow the Peremoha station, the planned depot (Depot-3) "Oleksiivske" was set to be completed in 2018.

A perspective extension towards the Kharkiv International Airport to the south would add the Derzhavinska, Odeska, Motel Druzhba, and Aeroport stations. However, only two of the stations, Derzhavinska and Odeska, respectively, were outlined in the "Oblast Program of Construction and the Expansion of the Kharkiv Metropoliten, 2007–2012." Construction work on the two planned stations began in late 2015; they were originally planned to be completed in 2019, but will not open until sometime in the 2020s owing to construction delays. This part of the line will be 3.47 km long at a building cost of 2.66 billion hryvnia.
