= Oleksiivska (Kharkiv Metro) =

Kharkiv Metro station

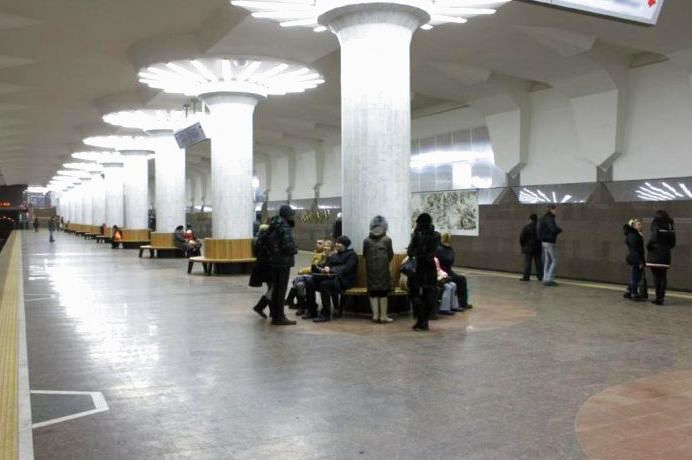
- The Station Hall

General information
- Coordinates: 50°3′0″N 36°12′24″E
- System: Kharkiv Metro Station
- Owner: Kharkiv Metro
- Line: Oleksiivska Line
- Platforms: 1
- Tracks: 2

Construction
- Structure type: underground
- Platform levels: 1

History
- Opened: 21 December 2010

Services
Preceding station	Kharkiv Metro	Following station
Peremoha Terminus	Oleksiivska Line	23 Serpnia towards Metrobudivnykiv
Location

Oleksiivska (Ukrainian: Олексіївська,) is a station on the Kharkiv Metro's Oleksiivska Line. The station opened on 21 December 2010. It was the terminus of the Oleksiivska Line until the Peremoha station was opened on 19 August 2016.

The station had been on the drawing board since 1992. Projected opening years of the station were 2005, 2006, 2008 and 2009.
