= Metrobudivnykiv (Kharkiv Metro) =

Kharkiv Metro station

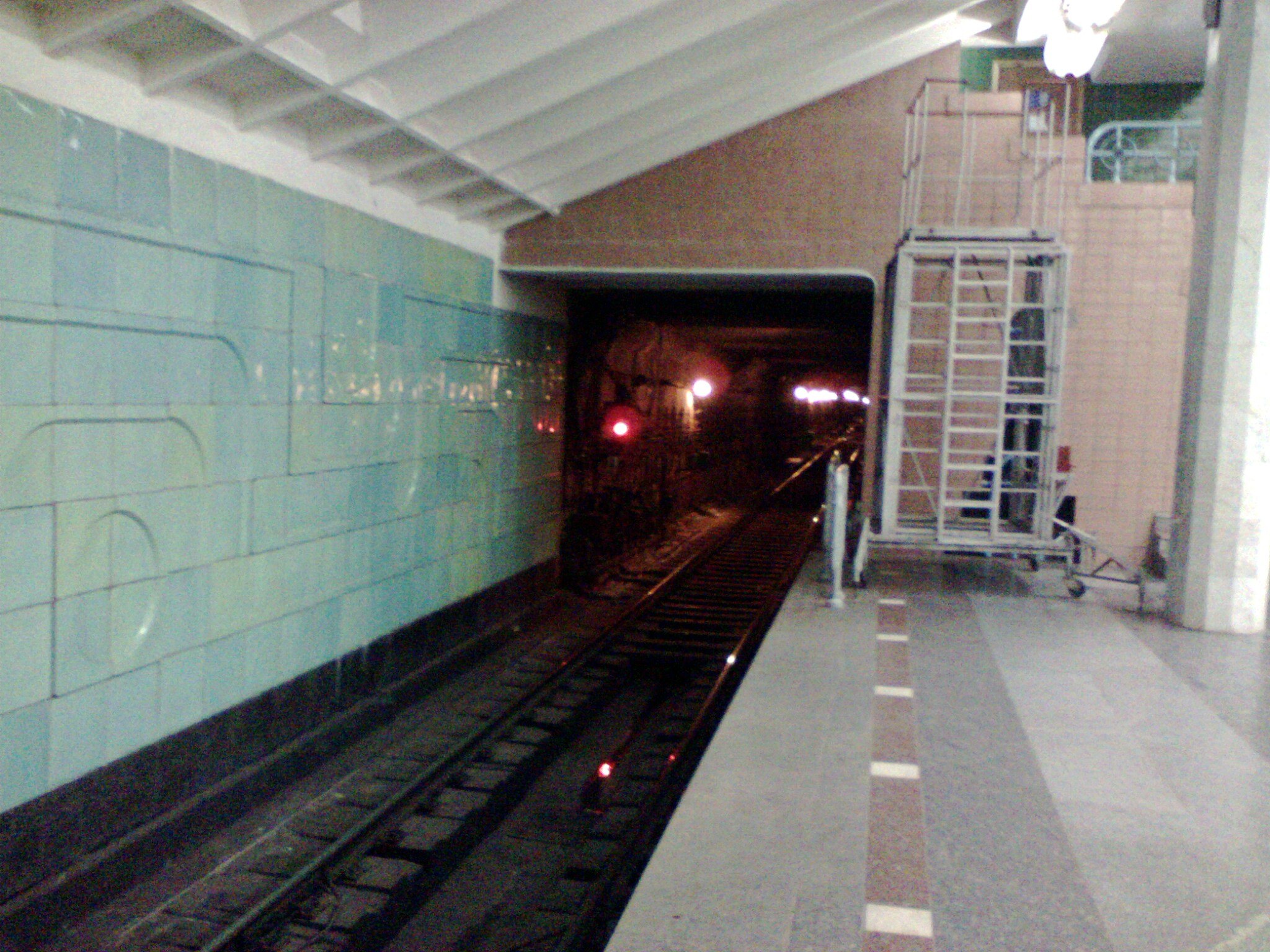
- View of the tunnel leading to the headshunt behind the station

General information
- Coordinates: 49°58′42.98″N 36°15′45.62″E
- System: Kharkiv Metro Station
- Owner: Kharkiv Metro
- Line: Oleksiivska Line
- Platforms: 1
- Tracks: 2

Construction
- Structure type: underground
- Platform levels: 1

History
- Opened: 6 May 1995

Services
Preceding station	Kharkiv Metro	Following station
Zakhysnykiv Ukrainy towards Peremoha	Oleksiivska Line	Terminus
Levada towards Kholodna Hora	Kholodnohirsko-Zavodska Line transfer at Sportyvna	Zavodska towards Industrialna
Location

Metrobudivnykiv (Ukrainian: Метробудівників,), formerly Metrobudivnykiv imeni H. I. Vashchenka (Ukrainian: Метробудівників імені Г.І. Ващенка) is a station on the Kharkiv Metro's Oleksiivska Line. The station opened on 6 May 1995. On 18 May 2016, the station was renamed, conforming with the law banning Communist names in Ukraine. Prior to this, from 2000 up to 2016, the station was named after Grigory Ivanovich Vashchenko, a member of the Ukrainian branch of the CPSU who lobbied for the construction of the Kharkiv Metro (and who later became the Soviet Minister of Trade from 1983 to 1986).
