= Peremoha (Kharkiv Metro) =

Kharkiv Metro station

General information
- Coordinates: 50°3′36.31″N 36°12′4.65″E
- System: Kharkiv Metro Station
- Owner: Kharkiv Metro
- Line: Oleksiivska Line
- Platforms: 1
- Tracks: 2

Construction
- Structure type: underground
- Platform levels: 2

History
- Opened: 19 August 2016 (first passengers 25 August 2016)

Services
Preceding station	Kharkiv Metro	Following station
Terminus	Oleksiivska Line	Oleksiivska towards Metrobudivnykiv
Location

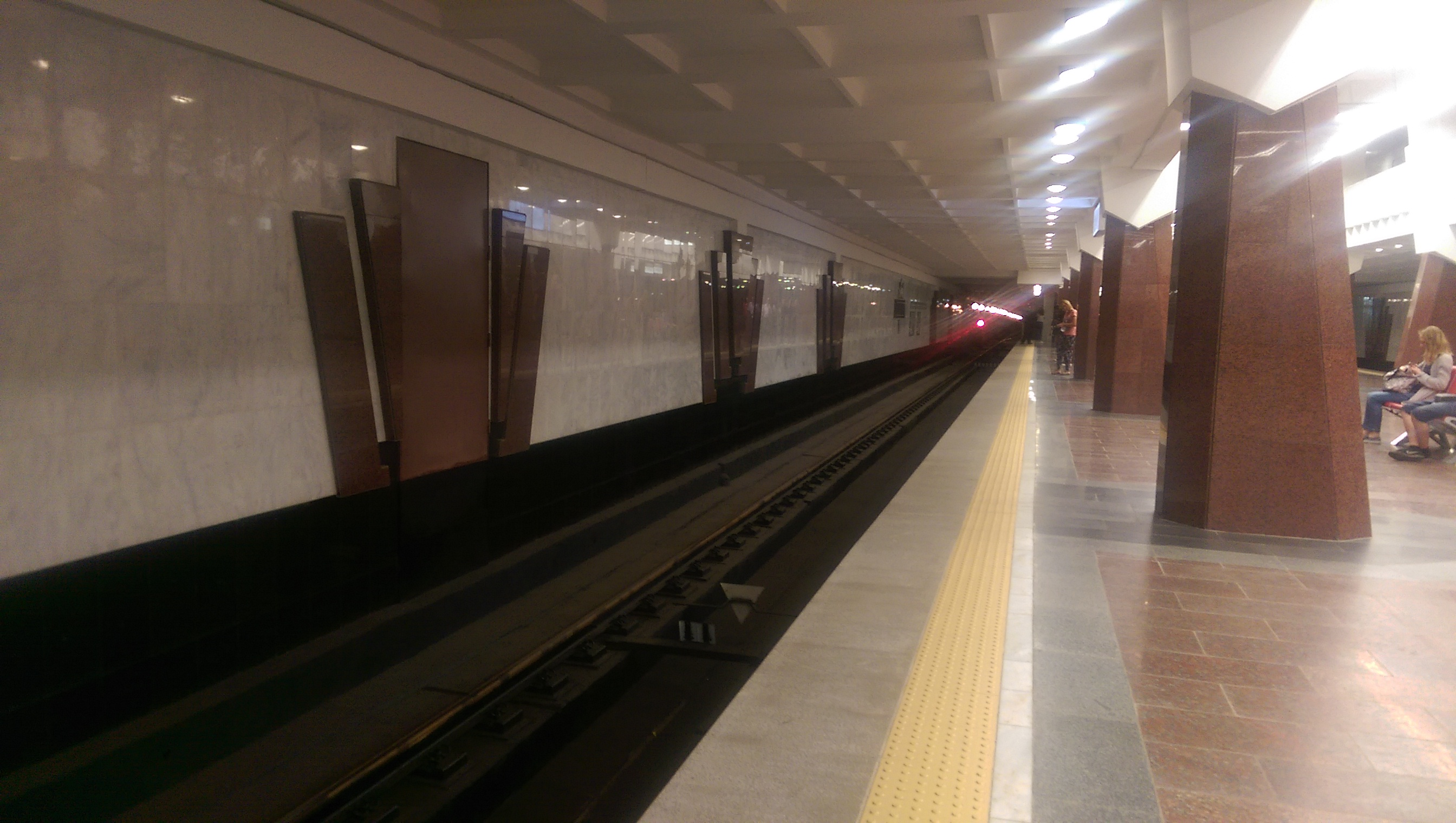
Station platform

Peremoha (Ukrainian: Перемога,; literally, Victory) is the 30th station of the Kharkiv Metro, located on the system's Oleksiivska Line. The station is located immediately north of the Oleksiivska station, and is the line's current terminus. The station's official opening was on 19 August 2016 by Ukrainian President Petro Poroshenko. The station welcomed its first passengers on 25 August 2016.

Peremoha is named after the Peremohy Avenue, which runs through the vicinity. During the early planning stages the station was referred to as Prospekt Peremohy (Ukrainian: Проспект Перемоги).

The station is the first Kharkiv metro station with disabled access.

== History ==
Construction of the station began in 1992, and since then construction was stopped numerous times. Under the initiative of Kharkiv Mayor Mykhailo Dobkin, construction work on the station began again in 2009, with an opening date of 2010, although it was later set back a couple of years due to inadequate funding. A new date was set at 7 or 8 May 2012, which would have had significance since Victory Day used to be then celebrated on 9 May (in Ukraine), and which would have been in time for the UEFA Euro 2012 football championship. However, new funding problems pushed the completion date back to 23 August 2012, then again another year further to 23 August 2013, and then again to 23 August 2014 (Kharkiv city day).

Architecturally, the station was planned to be modeled in the (former Soviet Union holiday celebrated on 9 May) Victory Day theme. In April 2015, the parliament of Ukraine outlawed Soviet and Communist symbols, street names and monuments, in a set of decommunization laws. In May 2015 Ukraine abolished Victory Day and replaced the holiday with Victory Day over Nazism in World War II (also celebrated on 9 May). Hence, the station's interior was slightly changed to comply with the April 2015 decommunization laws.

The station is designed to be two-tiered with the upper balconies used as an underground passenger walkway from either side of the Ludvík Svoboda Prospect.

The station's direct vicinity includes a market, tram and trolleybus lines. After the Peremoha station's completion, the Oleksiivska Line depot is planned to be constructed to the north of the station. Also planned is a new intercity bus station, which would lighten the traffic load upon the Tsentralnyi Rynok's bus station.

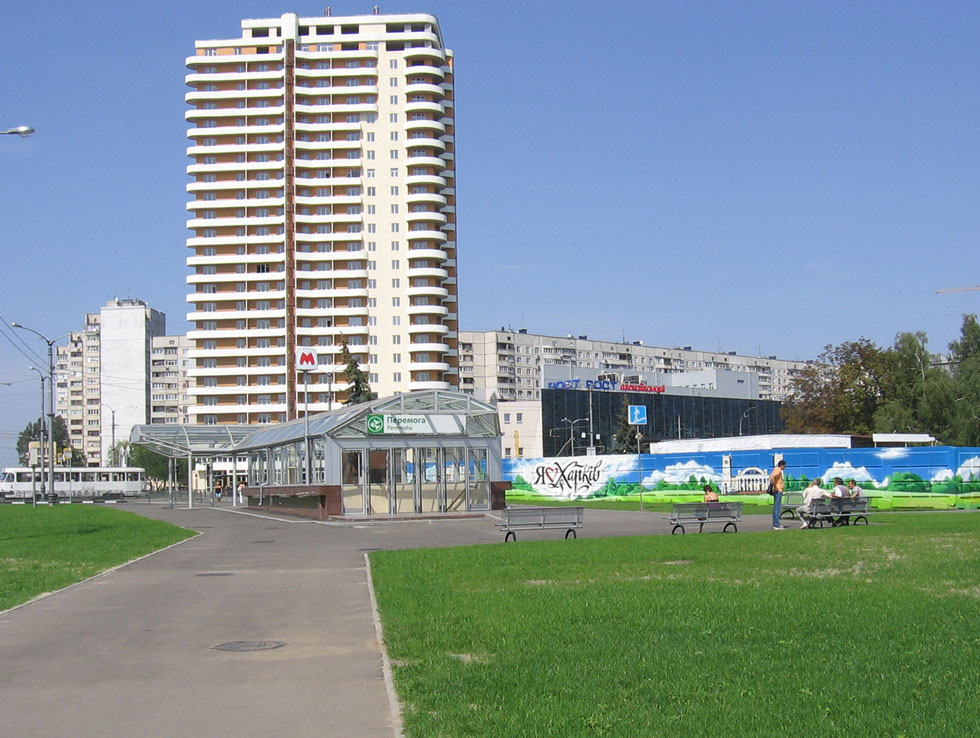
One of the station entrances
