= Timeline of Kharkiv =

The following is a timeline of the history of the city of Kharkiv, Ukraine.

== Prior to 20th century ==
Historical affiliations

Zaporozhian Cossacks under Tsardom of Russia 1654–1721
Russian Empire 1721–1917
Ukrainian People's Republic 1917–1918
Donetsk–Krivoy Rog Soviet Republic 1918
Ukrainian People's Republic 1918–1919
Ukrainian Soviet Socialist Republic 1919–1922
Soviet Ukraine 1922–1941
Nazi Germany 1941–1943 (occupation)
Soviet Ukraine 1943–1991
Ukraine 1991–present

- 1654 – Kharkiv founded by Zaporozhian Cossacks (regiment's capital of Kharkiv Regiment).
- 1689 – Church of the Intercession (Kharkiv) built.
- 1734 – Kharkov Collegium founded.
- 1764 – Church of the Holy Trinity built.
- 1765 – Town becomes capital of Sloboda Ukraine governetore in Russian Empire.
- 1777 – Assumption Cathedral built.
- 1797 – Town becomes part of the Kharkov Governorate.
- 1805 – Kharkiv University established.
- 1817 – Population: 12,892.
- 1820 – Building of Noble Assembly, Kharkiv constructed on Market Square, Kharkiv.
- 1835 – Town becomes capital of Kharkov Governorate.
- 1867 – Population: 59,968.
- 1868 – Railway begins operating.
- 1878 – Student protest.
- 1882
  - Jewish Bilu group moves to Palestine.
  - Population: 133,139.
- 1885 – Technological Institute founded.
- 1886 - Kharkiv Public Library and Museum of Art and Industry established.
- 1893 – Myronosytska Church rebuilt.
- 1895 – Kharkov Locomotive Factory begins operating.
- 1897 – Population: 170,682.
- 1900
  - Revolutionary Ukrainian Party founded in city.
  - Population: 197,405.

== 20th century ==
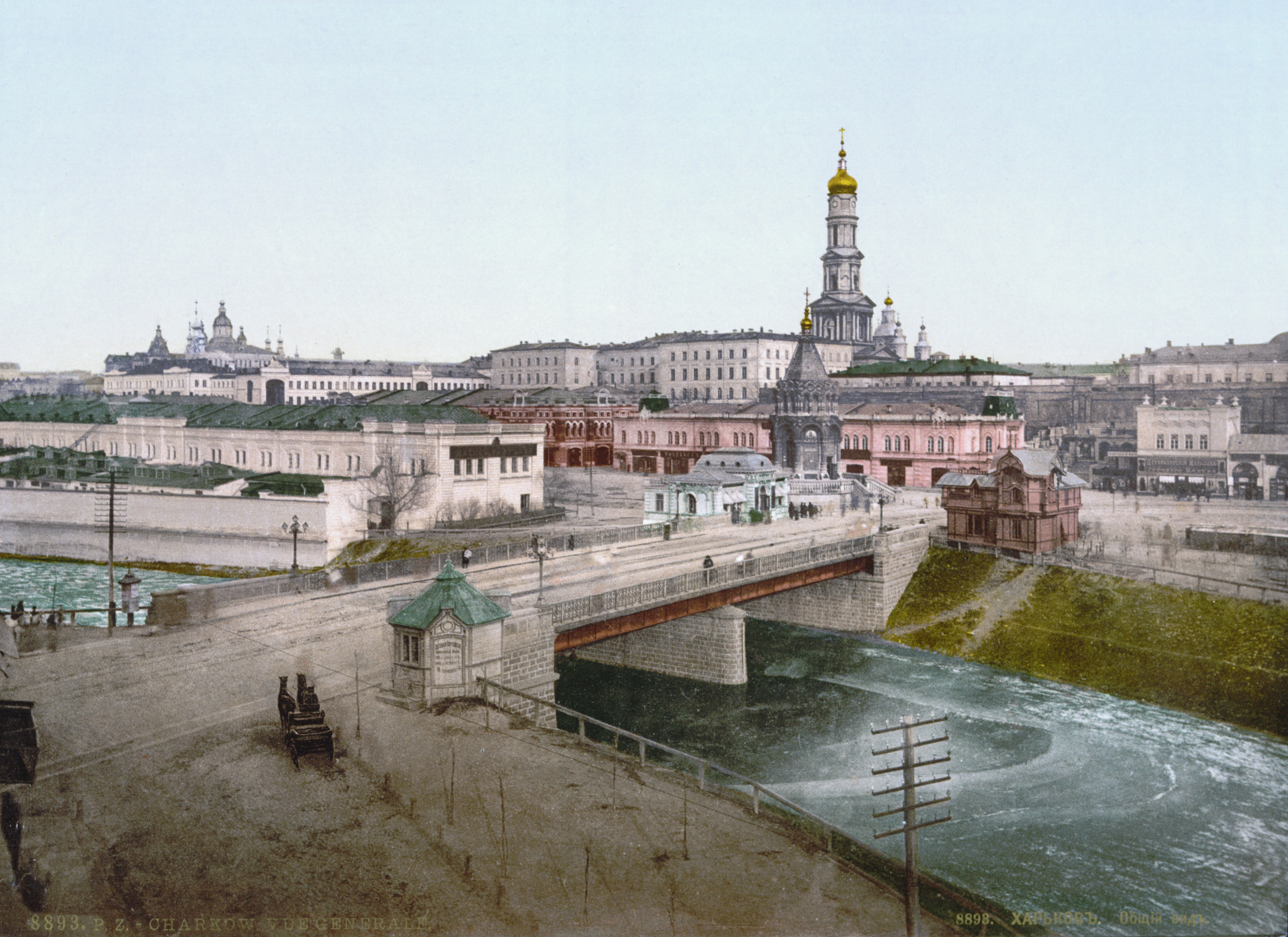
Kharkiv at the turn of the 20th century

- 1901 – Annunciation Cathedral consecrated.
- 1903 – "People's palace" established.
- 1906 – Tram begins operating.
- 1913
  - Choral Synagogue built.
  - Population: 258,360.
- 1917 – December: First All-Ukrainian Congress of Soviets (Kharkiv) held in city.
- 1918
  - February: City becomes capital of Donetsk–Krivoy Rog Soviet Republic.
  - April: troops loyal to the Ukrainian People's Republic take control of Kharkiv together with the German Army.
- 1919
  - January: Kharkiv taken by the Red Army.
  - March: Annual congress of the Communist Party of Ukraine (Soviet Union) begins in Kharkiv.
  - June: Kharkiv taken by the White Army.
  - December: Kharkiv retaken by the Red Army.
- 1920
  - City becomes capital of the Ukrainian Soviet Socialist Republic.
  - Museum of History opens.
- 1921
  - Polish diplomatic mission established.
  - Futurist Komkosmos group formed.
- 1922 - City becomes part of the Union of Soviet Socialist Republics (USSR).
- 1924 - Kharkov Steam Locomotive Plant housing built.
- 1925 - Football Club Metalist Kharkiv formed.
- 1926
  - Traktor Stadium opens.
  - Population: 417,342.
- 1927
  - Nova Generatsiia literary journal begins publication.
  - Morozov Design Bureau (arms industry) established.
- 1928
  - Modernist Derzhprom building and Construction Workers Club built.
  - Literaturnyi iarmarok journal begins publication.
- 1929
  - Institute of Political Education established.
  - Palace of Labor, and textile workers' club built.
- 1930
  - International Conference of Revolutionary Writers held in city.
  - National Aerospace University – Kharkiv Aviation Institute founded.
- 1932
  - Holodomor (famine).
  - City becomes part of the Kharkiv Oblast.
- 1933 - House of Trade and House of Planning Organizations and KhTZ Stadium built.
- 1934
  - Ukrainian SSR capital relocated from Kharkov to Kiev.
  - Kharkov Opera House opens.
  - International Hotel built.
  - Red Factory Theatre built (approximate date).
- 1935
  - College of Textile and Design established.
  - Shevchenko monument erected in Postyshev Park.
- 1939 – Population: 833,432.
- 1940 – April–May: Execution of Polish officers in Kharkov as part of the Katyn massacre.

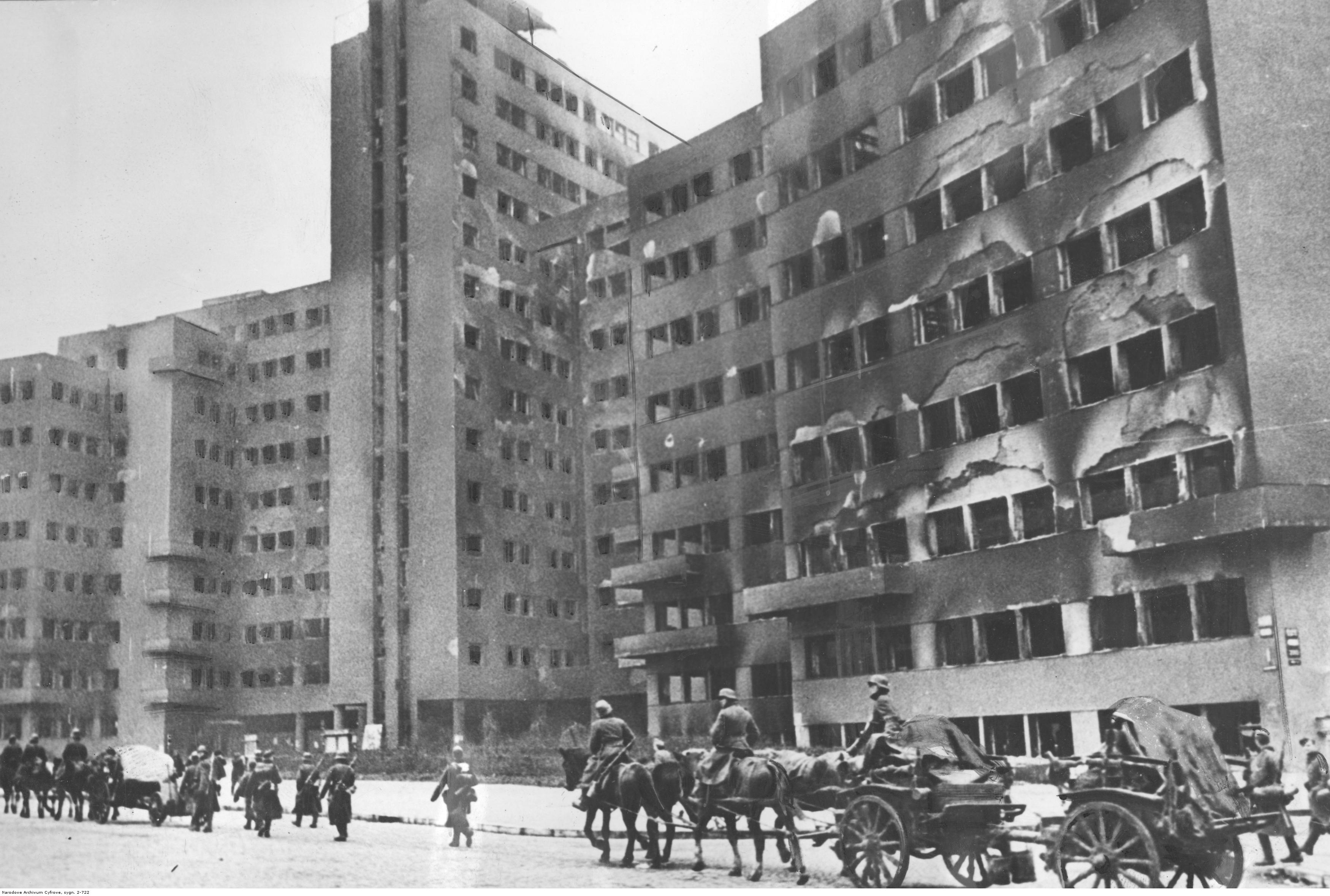
German troops entering Kharkiv in 1941

- 1941
  - 1,200 political prisoners burned alive by the retreating Soviets in the Kharkiv tragedy.
  - 20–24 October: First Battle of Kharkov; Germans in power.
  - Nazi prison established by the Germans.
- 1942 – 12–28 May: Second Battle of Kharkov.
- 1943
  - 19 February-15 March: Third Battle of Kharkov.
  - 12–23 August: Fourth Battle of Kharkov; Soviets in power.
- 1947 – Zerkalʹnaya struya (fountain) built.
- 1954
  - Kharkov Airport opens.
  - Institute of Fire Safety established.
- 1959 - Population: 934,136.
- 1962 - Institute of Radioelectronics established.
- 1964
  - Lenin monument erected in Dzerzhinsky Square.
  - Kharkiv State Academy of Culture active.
- 1965 – Population: 1,070,000.
- 1972 – 18 May: Airplane crash occurs near city.
- 1975 – Kharkiv Metro begins operating.
- 1979 – Population: 1,485,000.
- 1981 - Kharkiv TV Tower erected.
- 1984 - Kharkiv Metro Bridge opens.
- 1985 - Population: 1,554,000.
- 1988 – Museum of Literature established.
- 1989
  - Population: 1,609,959.
  - Sister city relationship established with Cincinnati, USA.
- 1990
  - UkrSibbank (bank) headquartered in city.
  - Mykola Lysenko Kharkiv Academic Opera and Ballet Theatre built.
- 1991 – City becomes part of independent Ukraine.
- 1995 - 1995 Kharkiv drinking water disaster.

== 21st century ==
- 2001 - Population: 1,470,902.
- 2002 - Roman Catholic Diocese of Kharkiv-Zaporizhia established.
- 2004 – Palace of Sports "Lokomotiv" arena opens.
- 2006 – 22 April: Supermarket bombings.
- 2010 – Hennadiy Kernes becomes mayor.
- 2012
  - June: Some UEFA Euro 2012 football games played in Kharkiv.
  - 15 December: Beheadings
- 2014
  - 6-8 April: Kharkiv People's Republic is established on 7 April by separatists in the city hall and promptly disbanded the early morning of 8 April following a police raid.
  - 28 April: Attempted assassination of mayor Kernes.
  - Kharkiv Battalion established.
  - Population: 1,451,132.

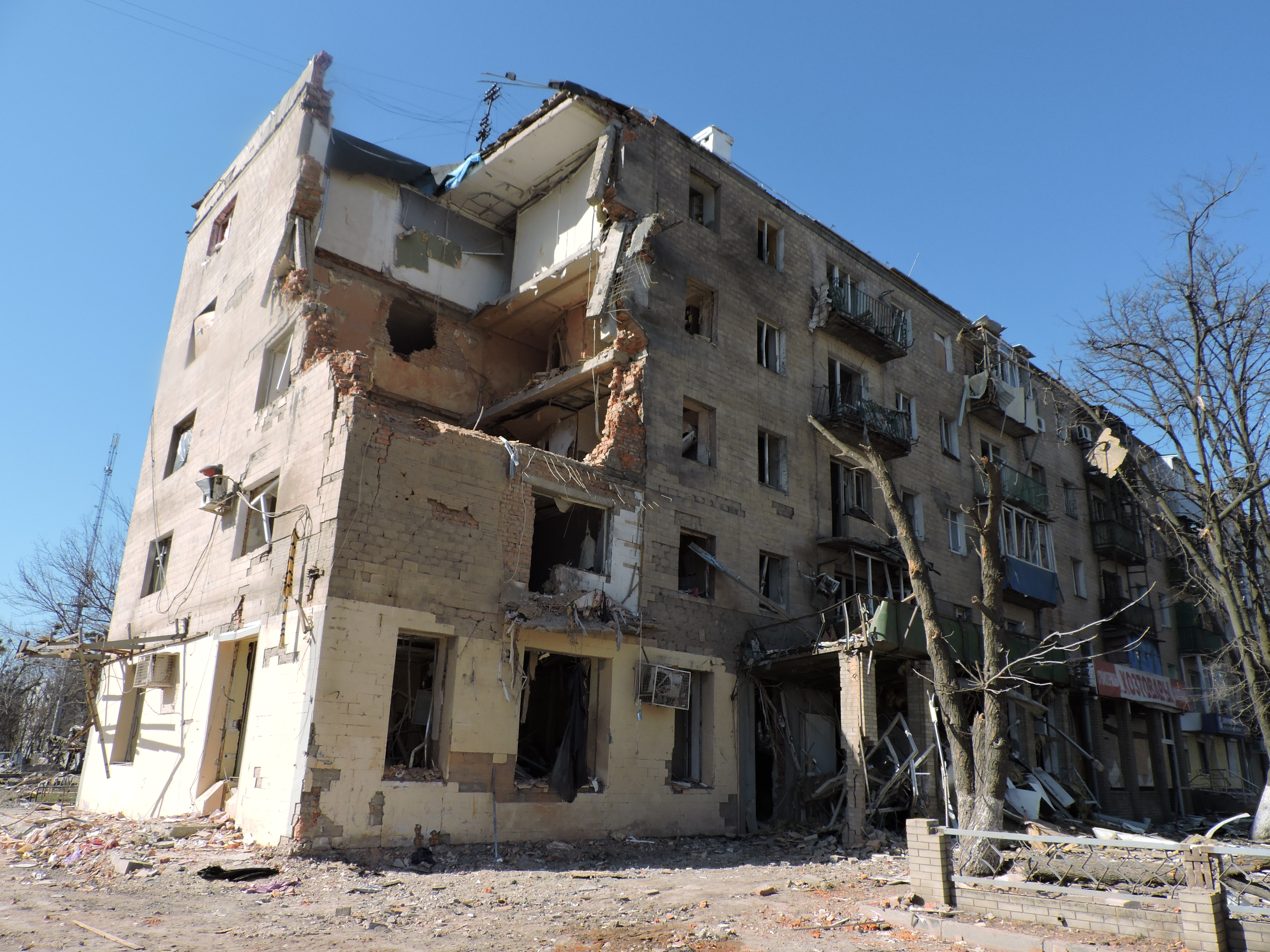
War damages after a Russian airstrike in 2022

- 2015 – 22 February: Bombing.
- 2018 – Population: 1,430,515 (estimate).
- 2021 – 21 January: Fire.
- 2022 – 24 February: Battle against Russia Begins.

== See also ==
- History of Kharkiv
- Other names of Kharkiv (e.g. Charkow, Harkov, Kharkoff, Kharkow)
- List of mayors of Kharkiv

== Bibliography ==
- Johann Georg Kohl (1844). "Kharkoff". Russia: St. Petersburg, Moscow, Kharkoff, Riga, Odessa, the German Provinces on the Baltic, the Steppes, the Crimea, and the Interior of the Empire. Chapman and Hall. hdl:2027/ucw.ark:/13960/t2q538v45.
- D. I. Bagalei & D. I. Miller (1905). Istoriia goroda Khar'kova za 250 let ego sushchestvovaniia s 1655 do 1905 g. [History of Kharkov] (in Ukrainian). Khar'kov. OCLC 16583341.
- Annette M. B. Meakin (1906). "Kharkoff". Russia, Travels and Studies. London: Hurst and Blackett. OCLC 3664651.
- "Kharkov (town)" . Encyclopædia Britannica. Vol. 15 (11th ed.). 1910. p. 772.
- "Kharkov". Russia with Teheran, Port Arthur, and Peking. Leipzig: Karl Baedeker. 1914. OCLC 1328163.
- Michael F. Hamm (1981). "Khar'kov's Progressive Duma, 1910–1914: A Study in Russian Municipal Reform". Slavic Review. 40 (1): 17–36. doi:10.2307/2496425. JSTOR 2496425. S2CID 159585533.
- Titus D. Hewryk (1992). "Planning of the Capital in Kharkiv". Harvard Ukrainian Studies. 16 (3/4): 325–359. JSTOR 41036482.
- Elena Ivanova (2003). "Changes in Collective Memory: The Schematic Narrative Template of Victimhood in Kharkiv Museums". Journal of Museum Education. 28 (1): 17–22. doi:10.1080/10598650.2003.11510471. JSTOR 40479276. S2CID 186523041.
- Volodymyr Kravchenko (2023). Kharkov/Kharkiv: A Borderland Capital. New York: Berghahn Books.
