= 2016 European Universities Games =

3rd European Universities Games: 3. Europske sveučilišne igre
- Host city: Zagreb; Rijeka
- Country: Croatia
- Nations: 41
- Athletes: 4,786
- Sport: 21 + 2 para
- Opening: 13 July 2016
- Closing: 25 July 2016
- Opened by: Tihomir Orešković (Prime minister of Croatia)
- Athlete's Oath: Ana Lenard, karate (University of Zagreb)
- Judge's Oath: Ivan Šverko, basketball (Rijeka)
- Website: www.eug2016.com

The 2016 European University Games, also known as 2016 European Universiade, was the third biannual European Universities Games (EUG), the largest European multisport event, with 4800 participants from 403 universities in 41 countries. The event took place in the Croatian cities of Zagreb and Rijeka between 13 and 25 July 2016, and was organised by European University Sports Association (EUSA) and Croatian Academic Sport Federation (CASF) with the cooperation of University of Zagreb, University of Rijeka, City of Rijeka, City of Zagreb and Ministry of Science, Education and Sport.

== Introduction ==
=== Bid selection ===
The host for the European Universities Games 2016 was decided on 1 June 2013 in Ljubljana, Slovenia, by the EUSA Executive Committee. The two bids were Zagreb and Rijeka in Croatia, and Coimbra in Portugal. The Croatian presentation was followed by a questions and answers session, and the same system applied also for the Portuguese delegation with the bidding city of Coimbra, which came next.

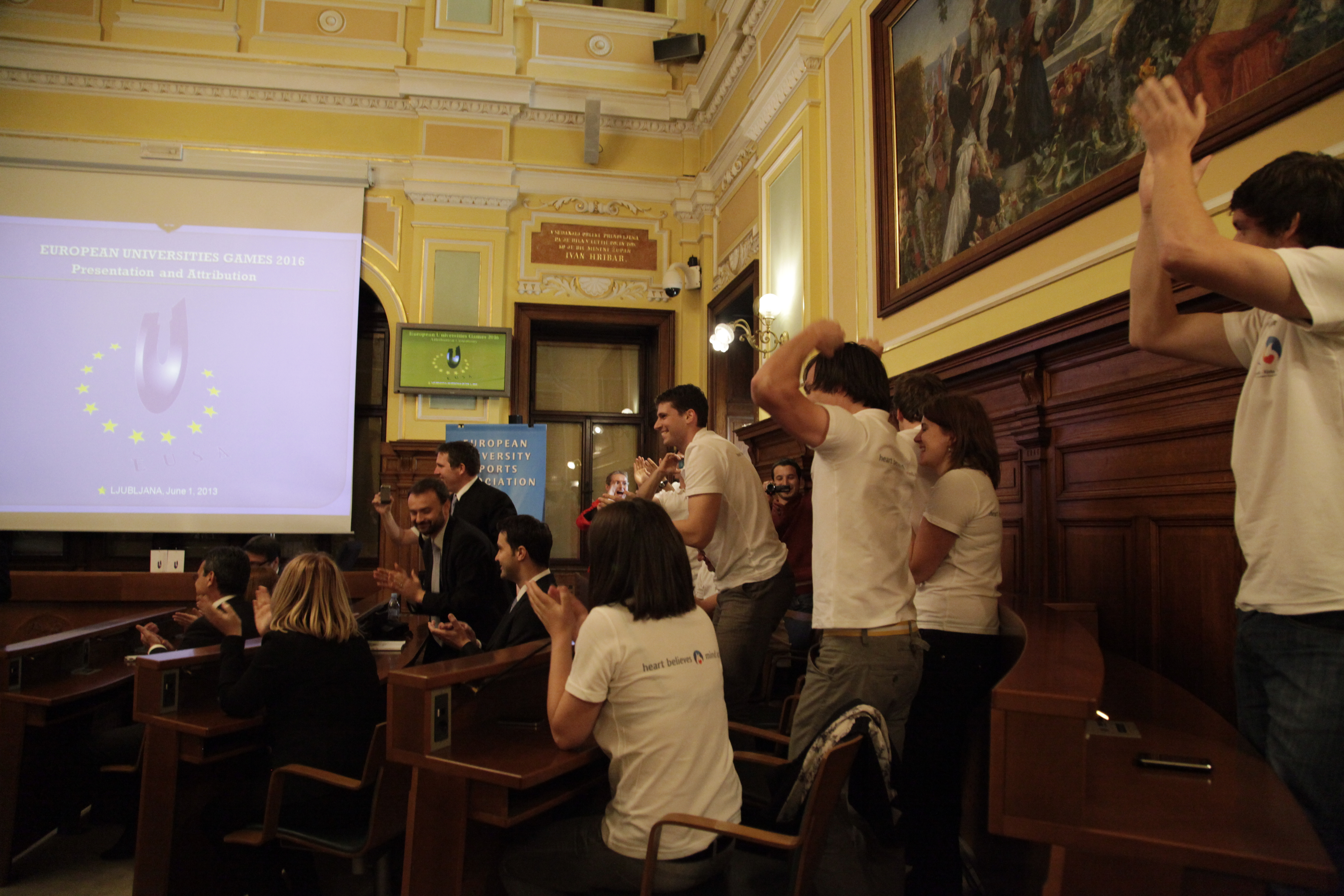
The moment when Croatia won the bid for organizing EUG2016

The Croatian delegation was led by Gordan Kozulj, the Chairman of the Bidding Committee, and other members of the delegation were Zeljko Jovanovic, Minister of Science, Education and Sports; Pero Lučin, Rector of the University of Rijeka; Petra Radetic, President of Student Council of the University of Zagreb; Jelena Pavicic Vukicevic, Deputy Mayor of the City of Zagreb and Zrinko Custonja, the President of the Croatian University Sports Federation (CASF). The Portuguese delegation was composed of Mr Ricardo Morgado, the Chairman of the Bidding Committee; Mr Emidio Guerreiro, Secretary of State for Sport and Youth; Mr Joao Gabriel Silva, Rector of the University of Coimbra; Mr Joao Barbosa De Melo, Mayor of Coimbra; Mr Bruno Barracosa, the President of the Academic University Sports Federation of Portugal (FADU) and Mr Tiago Martins, Vice-President of the Students Council of the University of Coimbra.

Before the announcement of the winning city was done, EUSA President Roczek stressed the quality of both bids and presentations, and then announced "The 3rd European Universities Games in 2016 will be organised in: Zagreb-Rijeka in Croatia" Coimba in Portugal was later chosen to host the 2018 European Universities Games.

=== Tradition of university sports in Croatia ===
The first student sports club was founded 112 years ago at the University of Zagreb. The Federation of Academic Sports Clubs at the University of Zagreb was founded 92 years ago. Mandatory physical education classes were introduced in Croatian universities 52 years ago. Twenty eight years ago the first University Games, also known as Universiade, was organized in Zagreb. The Croatian Academic Sports Federation was founded 22 years ago. Organized primarily as a cultural and a social event, the 1987 Universiade in Zagreb helped bring infrastructural renaissance to the capital city of Croatia and created the prerequisites for the significant advancement of Croatian sport as a whole.

== Sports ==
=== Sport events ===
The 2016 European University Games programme featured 21 sports including Compulsory sports (8), Optional sports (11), Demo sports programme (2) and sports for students with disabilities (2) for the first time in academical sport.

- Badminton (5)
- Basketball (2)
- Basketball 3x3 (5)
- Beach volleyball (2)
- Bridge (2)
- Chess (4)
- Climbing (3)
- Football (2)
- Futsal (2)
- Golf (2)
- Handball (2)
- Judo (16)
- Karate (12)
- Rowing (21)
- Rugby sevens (2)
- Swimming (33)
- Table tennis (8)
- Volleyball (2) (details)
- Water polo (2) (details)
- Tennis (2)
- Taekwondo (20)

== Venues ==
=== Venues in Zagreb ===
==== Dom sportova ====
- Badminton (1)

==== Dvorana Pauk ====
- Bridge
- Chess

==== Football ====
Stadium	Home club	Capacity	Scheduled games
Stadion na Peščenici	NK HAŠK	2,500	
Stadion Lučko	NK Lučko	3,000	
Stadion sv. Josip Radnik	NK Sesvete	2,000	
Stadion NK Kustošija	NK Kustošija	2,550	
Stadion NK Trnje	NK Trnje	1,100	
Stadion NK Vrapče	NK Vrapče	1,000	
Football center Zagrebello	NC Zagrebello	1,500	
ŠRC Rudeš	NK Rudeš	3,900	

==== ŠRC Jarun ====
- Rowing

==== Sportski park Mladost ====
- Athletics
- Swimming
- Water Polo

== Opening ceremony ==
The EUG 2016 Opening Ceremony took place on Wednesday, July 13, 2016 at 21.00 with a live TV broadcast by the national TV broadcaster (Croatian Radiotelevision - HRT), and a duration of 120 minutes. The tickets for the opening ceremony were free, but without them it was not possible to enter the event area – the athletics stadium of the Sports park Mladost in Zagreb.

Directed by Krešimir Dolenčić, the ceremony started with an introduction of host cities. Zagreb was depicted as the city of universities, parks, museums, art and sporting success, while Rijeka was depicted as the city of naval tradition, torpedoes, rock and roll, "good vibrations" and the biggest Croatian carnival. Croatian singer Damir Kedžo and the University of Zagreb’s choir Concordia discors performed the official song of the Games "As long as heart believes". The anthem describes the synergy of faith and hard work, which explains its popularity among the athletes who came to the Games. It is not easy to study and achieve good sporting results at the same time, and the very fact that they are participating makes all student athletes at the Games champions of hard work, faith, knowledge, and labor. A parade of this year’s participants ensued; the participants and the organizers of the 1987 Universiade carried the flag of the European University Sports Association, leading the parade – legendary basketball coach Mirko Novosel, the president of the Executive Board of the 1987 Universiade, lawyer Vladimir Pezo, the former Mayor of Zagreb, Dr. Mato Mikić, the director of the security sector of the 1987 Universiade, Lieutenant General Mate Laušić, the director of the opening ceremony of the 1987 Universiade, Paolo Magelli, and theatre director and producer Duško Ljuština, who was the director of the culture sector at the 1987 Universiade. The first group of flag-carriers then passed the flag to the second group, consisting of several Croatian trophy-winning athletes: longtime member of the Croatian national water polo team Dubravko Šimenc, basketball player Danira Bilić, backstroke swimmer Gordan Kožulj, basketball player and coach Aleksandar Petrović, tennis player Renata Šašak and water polo player Samir Barać. Over five thousand participants walked the athletic track at Mladost Stadium, entering the track in alphabetical order by the name of the country they came from. The hosts occasionally made interesting remarks about the 403 universities participating in the Games. The hosts walked at the tail of the parade – Croatian students came from 16 universities from Zagreb, Osijek, Karlovac, Rijeka, Split, Pula, Vukovar and Dubrovnik. Before the oaths were taken, the attendees were addressed by the president of the European Universities Games Zagreb – Rijeka 2016 Zrinko Čustonja, the Rector of the University of Zagreb Damir Boras, the president of the European University Sports Association Adam Roczek and the Croatian Prime Minister Tihomir Orešković.

In the end, contestants and referees took their oaths. On behalf of the contestants the oath was taken by Ana Lenard, a karateist from Zagreb, while Ivan Šverko, a basketball referee from Rijeka, took the oath on behalf of the referees.

== Closing ceremony ==
The closing ceremony of the European Universities Games in Zagreb and Rijeka took place at Rijeka Korzo on July 25, 2016. These third European Universities Games were the greatest and biggest to date by the number of participants, with almost six thousand student athletes from 403 universities and 41 European countries who competed in Rijeka and Zagreb over the two weeks.

The ceremony was attended by numerous dignitaries who praised the organizers and congratulated the participants on their results. Near the very end of tonight’s programme, after the young bell-ringers passed him the flag of EUSA, Daniel Moreno, representative of the next host of the European Universities Games – the Portuguese city of Coimbra, addressed the audience: "This is a great moment for the university sports movement. The standard of quality these games have set is high, and we will do our best to deliver an event as this one in Coimbra, Portugal in 2018."

The Games, which were opened with a great opening ceremony at Mladost Stadium in Zagreb, were closed today in Rijeka, thus symbolically closing the circle of organization of the largest multi-sport event in recent Croatian history.

== Medals ==
University	Country	Gold	Silver	Bronze	Total
University of Zagreb (co-host)	(Croatia) CRO	30	18	17	65
University of Split	(Croatia) CRO	11	5	5	21
University of Valencia	(Spain) ESP	11	4	1	16
University of Vichy	(France) FRA	8	0	0	8
University of Rijeka (co-host)	(Croatia) CRO	5	7	6	18
Ural Federal University	(Russia) RUS	5	7	3	15
University of Heidelberg	(Germany) GER	5	3	2	10
Yeditepe University	(Turkey) TUR	5	3	2	10
University of Niš	(Serbia) SRB	5	1	2	8
Russian State University for the Humanities	(Russia) RUS	5	1	1	7
Eotvos Lorand University	(Hungary) HUN	5	1	0	6
University of Ljubljana	(Slovenia) SLO	4	2	5	11
Slovak University of Technology in Bratislava	(Slovakia) SVK	4	2	0	6
Istanbul Aydin University	(Turkey) TUR	4	1	1	6
University of Kragujevac	(Serbia) SRB	4	0	0	4
University of Bochum	(Germany) GER	3	4	3	10
University of Stirling	(United Kingdom) GBR	3	1	2	6
University of Minho	(Portugal) POR	3	0	7	10
Marmara University	(Turkey) TUR	3	0	1	4
GEA College	(Slovenia) SLO	3	0	0	3
University of Strasbourg	(France) FRA	2	2	1	5
Kharkiv State Academy of Physical Culture	(Ukraine) UKR	2	2	1	5
Siberian Federal University	(Russia) RUS	2	1	2	5
Lithuanian Sports University	(Lithuania) LTU	2	1	1	4
Armenian State Institute of Physical Culture and Sport	(Armenia) ARM	2	1	0	3
Charles University	(Czech Republic) CZE	2	1	0	3
Matej Bel University	(Slovakia) SVK	2	1	0	3
University of Belgrade	(Serbia) SRB	2	0	4	6
Sarajevo University	(Bosnia and Herzegovina) BIH	2	0	4	6
Reading University	(United Kingdom) GBR	2	0	1	3
University of Turku	(Finland) FIN	2	0	1	3
State University of Physical Education and Sport	(Moldova) MDA	2	0	0	2
University of Linz	(Austria) AUT	2	0	0	2
Oxford Brooks University	(United Kingdom) GBR	2	0	0	2
Moscow Aviation Institute	(Russia) RUS	2	0	0	2
University of Cordoba	(Spain) ESP	2	0	0	2
University of East London	(United Kingdom) GBR	2	0	0	2
Robert Gordon University	(United Kingdom) GBR	2	0	0	2
University of Novi Sad	(Serbia) SRB	1	5	3	9
Technical University of Catalonia	(Spain) ESP	1	4	1	6
National Institute of Applied Sciences Lyon	(France) FRA	1	3	3	7
University of Potsdam	(Germany) GER	1	3	1	5
Technical University of Madrid	(Spain) ESP	1	2	3	6
University of Lisbon	(Portugal) POR	1	2	3	6
Uludag University	(Turkey) TUR	1	2	1	4
University of Edinburgh	(United Kingdom) GBR	1	1	3	5
Sumy State University	(Ukraine) UKR	1	1	1	3
Opole University	(Poland) POL	1	1	1	3
Autonomous University of Barcelona	(Spain) ESP	1	1	0	2
Nizhny Novgorod State University	(Russia) RUS	1	1	0	2
Belarusian State Pedagogical University	(Belarus) BLR	1	1	0	2
University of Montpellier	(France) FRA	1	1	0	2
Szechenyi Istvan University	(Hungary) HUN	1	1	0	2
Sheffield Hallam University	(United Kingdom) GBR	1	1	0	2
Masaryk University	(Czech Republic) CZE	1	1	0	2
University of Coimbra	(Portugal) POR	1	0	4	5
Erzincan University	(Turkey) TUR	1	0	3	4
Istanbul Ticaret University	(Turkey) TUR	1	0	3	4
Kozminski University	(Poland) POL	1	0	3	4
University of Bordeaux	(France) FRA	1	0	3	4
Karlsruhe Institute of Technology	(Germany) GER	1	0	3	4
University of Orleans	(France) FRA	1	0	2	3
University of Vienna	(Austria) AUT	1	0	2	3
Vytautas Magnus University	(Lithuania) LTU	1	0	1	2
University School of Physical Education in Poznan	(Poland) POL	1	0	1	2
University of Barcelona	(Spain) ESP	1	0	1	2
Paris Descartes University	(France) FRA	1	0	1	2
Polotsk State University	(Belarus) BLR	1	0	1	2
University of Cambridge	(United Kingdom) GBR	1	0	1	2
University of Sheffield	(United Kingdom) GBR	1	0	1	2
Pavol Jozef Safarik University	(Slovakia) SVK	1	0	1	2
University of Mostar	(Bosnia and Herzegovina) BIH	1	0	1	2
Georgian National University Seu	(Georgia (country)) GEO	1	0	0	1
Leeds Beckett University	(United Kingdom) GBR	1	0	0	1
Moscow State University of Mechanical Engineering	(Russia) RUS	1	0	0	1
Radboud University Nijmegen	(Netherlands) NED	1	0	0	1
Vasile Alecsandri University of Bacău	(Romania) ROU	1	0	0	1
University of Bergen	(Norway) NOR	1	0	0	1
University of Maribor	(Slovenia) SLO	1	0	0	1
University of Nice Sophia Antipolis	(France) FRA	1	0	0	1
University of Paris 13	(France) FRA	1	0	0	1
Uppsala University	(Sweden) SWE	1	0	0	1
University of Bihać	(Bosnia and Herzegovina) BIH	1	0	0	1
Delft University of Technology	(Netherlands) NED	1	0	0	1
Leibniz University of Hannover	(Germany) GER	1	0	0	1
University of Bremen	(Germany) GER	1	0	0	1
University of Nottingham	(United Kingdom) GBR	1	0	0	1
University of Constantine the Philosopher	(Slovakia) SVK	1	0	0	1
University of Salzburg	(Austria) AUT	1	0	0	1
Erasmus University Rotterdam	(Netherlands) NED	1	0	0	1
Polytechnic Institute of Porto	(Portugal) POR	1	0	0	1
J. J. Strossmayer University in Osijek	(Croatia) CRO	1	0	0	1
Technical University of Košice	(Slovakia) SVK	0	4	1	5
University of Innsbruck	(Austria) AUT	0	3	2	5
Newcastle University	(United Kingdom) GBR	0	3	0	3
University Donja Gorica	(Montenegro) MNE	0	2	3	5
University of Cologne	(Germany) GER	0	2	2	4
University of South Bohemia	(Czech Republic) CZE	0	2	2	4
University of Warsaw	(Poland) POL	0	2	1	3
Belarusian State University	(Belarus) BLR	0	2	0	2
German Sport University Cologne	(Germany) GER	0	2	0	2
University of Lausanne	(Switzerland) SUI	0	2	0	2
University of Lorraine	(France) FRA	0	2	0	2
University of Munster	(Germany) GER	0	2	0	2
Vilnius University	(Lithuania) LTU	0	2	0	2
Klaipeda University	(Lithuania) LTU	0	1	4	5
The Angelus Silesius State School of Higher Vocational Education in Walbrzych	(Poland) POL	0	1	4	5
Catholic University of Saint Anthony	(Spain) ESP	0	1	2	3
St. Cyril and Methodius University	(North Macedonia) MKD	0	1	2	3
University of Duisburg-Essen	(Germany) GER	0	1	2	3
Berlin University of H & S	(Germany) GER	0	1	2	3
Budapest University of Technology and Economics	(Hungary) HUN	0	1	1	2
Reykjavik University	(Iceland) ISL	0	1	1	2
University of Erlangen-Nuremberg	(Germany) GER	0	1	1	2
University of Graz	(Austria) AUT	0	1	1	2
University of Hagen	(Germany) GER	0	1	1	2
University of Lleida	(Spain) ESP	0	1	1	2
Vitebsk State University	(Belarus) BLR	0	1	1	2
Claude Bernard University Lyon	(France) FRA	0	1	1	2
Nova University of Lisbon	(Portugal) POR	0	1	1	2
Stanislaw Stastzic University of Applied Sciences in Pila	(Poland) POL	0	1	1	2
Technical University in Munich	(Germany) GER	0	1	1	2
Belarusian State University of Physical Culture	(Belarus) BLR	0	1	0	1
Swansea University	(United Kingdom) GBR	0	1	0	1
Technical University of Dortmund	(Germany) GER	0	1	0	1
Academy of Public Administration	(Belarus) BLR	0	1	0	1
Aix-Marseille University	(France) FRA	0	1	0	1
Durham University	(United Kingdom) GBR	0	1	0	1
Francisk Skorina Gomel State University	(Belarus) BLR	0	1	0	1
Institute of Lorraine Champagne - Ardenne	(France) FRA	0	1	0	1
Mendel University	(Czech Republic) CZE	0	1	0	1
Mogliev State A. Kuleshov University	(Belarus) BLR	0	1	0	1
Mogliev State University of Food Technologies	(Belarus) BLR	0	1	0	1
Norwegian School of Sport Sciences	(Norway) NOR	0	1	0	1
Obuda University	(Hungary) HUN	0	1	0	1
Pierre-and-Marrie-Curie University Paris	(France) FRA	0	1	0	1
Szent Istvan University	(Hungary) HUN	0	1	0	1
Tallinn University of Technology	(Estonia) EST	0	1	0	1
University "1 Decembrie 1918" Alba Iulia	(Romania) ROU	0	1	0	1
University of Almeria	(Spain) ESP	0	1	0	1
University of Applied Sciences Wiesbaden	(Germany) GER	0	1	0	1
University of Deusto	(Spain) ESP	0	1	0	1
University of Gloucestershire	(United Kingdom) GBR	0	1	0	1
University of London	(United Kingdom) GBR	0	1	0	1
University of Mainz	(Germany) GER	0	1	0	1
University of Stuttgart	(Germany) GER	0	1	0	1
University of Tras-os-Montes and Alto Douro	(Portugal) POR	0	1	0	1
University of Ulster	(Republic of Ireland) IRL	0	1	0	1
University of the Basque Country	(Spain) ESP	0	1	0	1
Ramon Llull University	(Spain) ESP	0	1	0	1
International University Sarajevo	(Bosnia and Herzegovina) BIH	0	1	0	1
Ternopil National Economic University	(Ukraine) UKR	0	1	0	1
Kazan Institute of Economics, Management and Law	(Russia) RUS	0	1	0	1
Comenius University	(Slovakia) SVK	0	0	2	2
Lithuanian University of Health Sciences	(Lithuania) LTU	0	0	2	2
Loughborough University	(United Kingdom) GBR	0	0	2	2
Oxford University	(United Kingdom) GBR	0	0	2	2
University of Zurich	(Switzerland) SUI	0	0	2	2
National Sports Academy Vasil Levski	(Bulgaria) BGR	0	0	2	2
Goethe University Frankfurt	(Germany) GER	0	0	2	2
University of Vic	(Spain) ESP	0	0	2	2
University of Rouen	(France) FRA	0	0	1	1
Belarusian Institute of Law	(Belarus) BLR	0	0	1	1
Catholic University of Portugal	(Portugal) POR	0	0	1	1
Coventry University	(United Kingdom) GBR	0	0	1	1
Czech University of Life Science	(Czech Republic) CZE	0	0	1	1
Faith University	(Turkey) TUR	0	0	1	1
Heroit Watt University	(Germany) GBR	0	0	1	1
Jagellonian University	(Poland) POL	0	0	1	1
KOC University	(Turkey) TUR	0	0	1	1
Kuban State University	(Russia) RUS	0	0	1	1
Lithuanian University of Educational Sciences	(Lithuania) LTU	0	0	1	1
Mustafa Kemal University	(Turkey) TUR	0	0	1	1
New 3D General Education School	(France) FRA	0	0	1	1
Nottingham Trent University	(United Kingdom) GBR	0	0	1	1
Queen's University Belfast	(United Kingdom) GBR	0	0	1	1
State University of Tetovo	(North Macedonia) MKD	0	0	1	1
Technical University of Ostrava	(Czech Republic) CZE	0	0	1	1
University of Applied Health Sciences	(Croatia) CRO	0	0	1	1
University of Applied Sciences Aachen	(Germany) GER	0	0	1	1
University of Applied Sciences Upper Austria	(Austria) AUT	0	0	1	1
University of Bern	(Switzerland) SUI	0	0	1	1
University of Caen	(France) FRA	0	0	1	1
University of Cyprus	(Cyprus) CYP	0	0	1	1
University of Dusseldorf	(Germany) GER	0	0	1	1
University of Eastern Finland	(Finland) FIN	0	0	1	1
University of Economics in Bratislava	(Slovakia) SVK	0	0	1	1
University of Exeter	(United Kingdom) GBR	0	0	1	1
University of Fribourg	(Switzerland) SUI	0	0	1	1
University of Groningen	(Netherlands) NED	0	0	1	1
University of Hamburg	(Germany) GER	0	0	1	1
University of Marburg	(Germany) GER	0	0	1	1
University of Montenegro	(Montenegro) MNE	0	0	1	1
University of Paris 1 Pantheon-Sorbonne	(France) FRA	0	0	1	1
University of Porto	(Portugal) POR	0	0	1	1
University of South Bohemia	(Czech Republic) CZE	0	0	1	1
University of Tuzla	(Bosnia and Herzegovina) BIH	0	0	1	1
Pompeu Fabra University	(Spain) ESP	0	0	1	1
Karlovac University of Applied Sciences	(Croatia) CRO	0	0	1	1
Rhine-Westphalia Institute of Rechnology Aachen	(Germany) GER	0	0	1	1
University Pantheon-Assas Paris 2	(France) FRA	0	0	1	1
University of Aberdeen	(United Kingdom) GBR	0	0	1	1
University College Martiniere Duchere	(France) FRA	0	0	1	1
Braunschweig University of Technology	(Germany) GER	0	0	1	1
University of Physical Education	(Hungary) HUN	0	0	1	1
British Universities & Colleges Sport	(United Kingdom) GBR	0	0	1	1
Total		216	178	224	618

== Symbols ==
=== Verbal identity: motto ===
The slogan Hearth believes, mind achieves, proclaims idea of dualism, which is integrated in the very proposal of the dual candidature of Zagreb and Rijeka, and its basic idea is officially explained as follows: _{"The slogan is the basic concept of the synergy of the heart and mind, two mighty organs of great contrast; however only through their joint work it is possible to achieve the proper functioning of the human body. The concept of dualism and synergy of the heart and mind, promote all the key values that student sports represent: ratio, education, prudence, strength, energy, fighting spirit and love – characteristics that help young people achieve excellence in their academic and athletic lives. The slogan also rests on the concepts of faith as a motivator, and achievement as a result of the successful sports activity. Both concepts represent important elements of sports – faith in one self and one’s own capabilities, faith in victory, the achievement of results, the worthiness of persistence and in vested effort."}

=== Visual identity: logo ===
The author of the visual identity is Croatian graphic designer Jurica Dolić, who described his solution as follows: _{"The visual identity embodies the verbal identity aspect by incorporating the symbol of the heart (shape, red colour) and mind (circle, blue colour). It also embodies a number of other symbols which have an exceptional importance for the candidature of Zagreb and Rijeka: Colours – red, white and blue are the representative colours of Croatian national symbols. Red is the colour of Rijeka, while blue is the representative colour of Zagreb. Shapes – white shapes (inside the blue circle) symbolize the number 16 (year of holding the Games – 2016). Furthermore, these shapes denote the silhouette of “Zagi” (the exceptionally popular mascot of the Zagreb Universiade from 1987), and in the combination with the red colour of the heart portrays a flame as the symbol of the sporting and Olympic spirit."}

=== The mascot ===
After public voting, the figure of hamster became an official mascote of EUG2016. Final selection of the mascot is the result of the selection process that began in September 2014, after which at an open call 64 applications with mascot suggestions arrived. Nine-member jury selected three finalists that were presented to the public who was offered the opportunity to make a final decision of the EUG 2016 mascot in the second round of the competition. The winning suggestion was the one by Croatian authors Vedran Rede and Matija Tomšić who created the mascot of hamster, suggesting that it is important to participate and not always to win.

=== Official Anthem ===
'As long as heart believes' is official song of European Universities Games Zagreb-Rijeka 2016.

Author of music and lyrics: Bruno Kovačić

Arrangement and production: Nikša Bratoš

Lyrics:

Look at me, I'm strong and so alive

I can run and I can fly so high

And chase the birds

Up to the sky

I can do it

At least I can try

I can write a song about us all

Make a chorus sound so lyrical

So beautiful

And powerful

Let us sing together to the world

Somewhere in the future I will be

Looking at my younger me

Feeling proud of what my mind achieves

For as long as heart believes

Someday we'll have children of our own

Planet Earth, still our only home

This blue dot we know

Where we love and grow

Will keep on living if we make it so

== See also ==
- 2012 European Universities Games
- European University Sports Association
- 1987 Summer Universiade
