= Volleyball at the 2016 European Universities Games =

Volleyball at the 2016 European Universities Games at the Indoor Volleyball
- Venue: 4
- Location: Zagreb, Croatia
- Dates: 18–24 July
- Nations: 17
- Teams: 31 (15 in men's & 16 in women's)

Medalists
gold medal	(France) University of Nice Sophia Antipolis (Men) (Romania) University of Bacau (Women)
silver medal	(Spain) University of Almeria (Men) (Switzerland) University of Lausanne (Women)
bronze medal	(Serbia) University of Niš (Men) (Serbia) University of Belgrade (Women)

The volleyball tournaments at the 2016 European Universities Games were played between 18 and 24 July. 31 teams from 26 universities of 17 European countries participated in the tournament. The tournament took place in Zagreb, Croatia.

== Men's tournament ==
=== Pool composition ===
- University of Warsaw from Poland withdrew from the tournament.

Pool A	Pool B	Pool C	Pool D
(Croatia) University of Zagreb (Finland) University of Jyväskylä (Romania) University of Bacău (Germany) Technical University of Munich	(Germany) University of Würzburg (Turkey) Gazi University (Netherlands) University of Groningen (Spain) University of Almería	(Serbia) University of Niš (Spain) University of Valencia (United Kingdom) Northumbria University (Croatia) University of Split	(France) University of Nice Sophia Antipolis (Portugal) University of Porto (Israel) Ben-Gurion University of the Negev

=== Preliminary round ===
- All times are Central European Daylight Time–(UTC+02:00)

==== Pool A ====
Pos	Team	Pld	W	L	Pts	SW	SL	SR	SPW	SPL	SPR	Qualification
1	(Croatia) University of Zagreb	3	2	1	6	8	6	1.333	317	302	1.050	Quarterfinals
2	(Germany) Technical University of Munich	3	2	1	5	7	5	1.400	277	276	1.004	Quarterfinals
3	(Finland) University of Jyväskylä	3	1	2	5	7	7	1.000	312	316	0.987	
4	(Romania) University of Bacău	3	1	2	2	4	8	0.500	269	281	0.957	

Date	Time		Score		Set 1	Set 2	Set 3	Set 4	Set 5	Total	Report
18 July	17:30	University of Zagreb (Croatia)	2–3	(Germany) Technical University of Munich	23–25	21–25	25–21	25–22	12–15	106–108	
18 July	20:00	University of Jyväskylä (Finland)	2–3	(Romania) University of Bacău	25–20	8–25	25–22	29–31	15–17	102–115	
19 July	17:30	Technical University of Munich (Germany)	3–0	(Romania) University of Bacău	25–23	25–18	29–27			79–68	
19 July	20:00	University of Zagreb (Croatia)	3–2	(Finland) University of Jyväskylä	25–22	21–25	25–27	25–22	15–12	111–108	
20 July	17:30	University of Jyväskylä (Finland)	3–1	(Germany) Technical University of Munich	23–25	25–17	25–21	29–27		102–90	
20 July	20:00	University of Bacău (Romania)	1–3	(Croatia) University of Zagreb	18–25	27–25	18–25	23–25		86–100	

==== Pool B ====
Pos	Team	Pld	W	L	Pts	SW	SL	SR	SPW	SPL	SPR	Qualification
1	(Spain) University of Almería	3	3	0	8	9	2	4.500	260	207	1.256	Quarterfinals
2	(Germany) University of Würzburg	3	2	1	7	8	5	1.600	288	283	1.018	Quarterfinals
3	(Netherlands) University of Groningen	3	1	2	2	4	8	0.500	260	267	0.974	
4	(Turkey) Gazi University	3	0	3	1	3	9	0.333	231	282	0.819	

Date	Time		Score		Set 1	Set 2	Set 3	Set 4	Set 5	Total	Report
18 July	09:30	University of Würzburg (Germany)	2–3	(Spain) University of Almería	25–22	19–25	25–23	22–25	12–15	103–110	
18 July	12:00	Gazi University (Turkey)	2–3	(Netherlands) University of Groningen	23–25	16–25	25–22	25–23	14–16	103–111	
19 July	09:30	University of Almería (Spain)	3–0	(Netherlands) University of Groningen	25–18	25–19	25–23			75–60	
19 July	12:00	University of Würzburg (Germany)	3–1	(Turkey) Gazi University	21–25	25–21	25–19	25–19		96–84	
20 July	09:30	Gazi University (Turkey)	0–3	(Spain) University of Almería	12–25	16–25	16–25			44–75	
20 July	12:00	University of Groningen (Netherlands)	1–3	(Germany) University of Würzburg	19–25	25–14	23–25	22–25		89–89	

==== Pool C ====
Pos	Team	Pld	W	L	Pts	SW	SL	SR	SPW	SPL	SPR	Qualification
1	(United Kingdom) Northumbria University	3	3	0	8	9	3	3.000	276	211	1.308	Quarterfinals
2	(Serbia) University of Niš	3	2	1	7	8	4	2.000	275	241	1.141	Quarterfinals
3	(Spain) University of Valencia	3	1	2	3	5	6	0.833	233	243	0.959	
4	(Croatia) University of Split	3	0	3	0	0	9	0.000	136	225	0.604	

Date	Time		Score		Set 1	Set 2	Set 3	Set 4	Set 5	Total	Report
18 July	09:30	University of Niš (Serbia)	3–0	(Croatia) University of Split	25–22	25–14	25–15			75–51	
18 July	12:00	University of Valencia (Spain)	1–3	(United Kingdom) Northumbria University	8–25	17–25	25–23	21–25		71–98	
19 July	09:30	University of Split (Croatia)	0–3	(United Kingdom) Northumbria University	12–25	7–25	19–25			38–75	
19 July	12:00	University of Niš (Serbia)	3–1	(Spain) University of Valencia	25–21	22–25	26–24	25–17		98–87	
20 July	09:30	University of Valencia (Spain)	3–0	(Croatia) University of Split	25–10	25–18	25–19			75–47	
20 July	12:00	Northumbria University (United Kingdom)	3–2	(Serbia) University of Niš	25–18	23–25	25–21	15–25	15–13	103–102	

==== Pool D ====
Pos	Team	Pld	W	L	Pts	SW	SL	SR	SPW	SPL	SPR	Qualification
1	(France) Univ. of Nice Sophia Antipolis	2	2	0	6	6	0	MAX	152	109	1.394	Quarterfinals
2	(Portugal) University of Porto	2	1	1	3	3	4	0.750	155	151	1.026	Quarterfinals
3	(Israel) Ben-Gurion University	2	0	2	0	1	6	0.167	115	162	0.710	

Date	Time		Score		Set 1	Set 2	Set 3	Set 4	Set 5	Total	Report
18 July	12:00	University of Porto (Portugal)	3–1	(Israel) Ben-Gurion University	25–16	25–18	12–25	25–15		87–74	
19 July	12:00	University of Nice Sophia Antipolis (France)	3–0	(Portugal) University of Porto	25–21	25–22	27–25			77–68	
20 July	12:00	Ben-Gurion University (Israel)	0–3	(France) University of Nice Sophia Antipolis	13–25	12–25	16–25			41–75	

=== Playoff round ===
==== 13th–15th classification ====
- Round-robin classification

Pos	Team	Pld	W	L	Pts	SW	SL	SR	SPW	SPL	SPR
1	(Turkey) Gazi University	2	2	0	6	6	2	3.000	199	175	1.137
2	(Romania) University of Bacău	2	1	1	3	4	4	1.000	179	179	1.000
3	(Croatia) University of Split	2	0	2	0	2	6	0.333	171	195	0.877

Date	Time		Score		Set 1	Set 2	Set 3	Set 4	Set 5	Total	Report
22 July	17:30	University of Bacău (Romania)	3–1	(Croatia) University of Split	25–15	25–23	19–25	25–18		94–81	
23 July	17:30	Gazi University (Turkey)	3–1	(Croatia) University of Split	25–20	26–24	25–27	25–19		101–90	
24 July	12:00	University of Bacău (Romania)	1–3	(Turkey) Gazi University	22–25	25–23	21–25	17–25		85–98	

==== 9th–12th bracket ====
Classification
A3	(Finland) University of Jyväskylä	1
C3	(Spain) University of Valencia	3
B3	(Netherlands) University of Groningen	3
D3	(Israel) Ben-Gurion University	0

9th place
C3	(Spain) University of Valencia	3
B3	(Netherlands) University of Groningen	1
11th place
A3	(Finland) University of Jyväskylä	3
D3	(Israel) Ben-Gurion University	2

===== Classification (9th–12th) =====
Date	Time		Score		Set 1	Set 2	Set 3	Set 4	Set 5	Total	Report
22 July	09:30	University of Jyväskylä (Finland)	1–3	(Spain) University of Valencia	27–29	25–21	15–25	21–25		88–100	
22 July	12:00	University of Groningen (Netherlands)	3–0	(Israel) Ben-Gurion University	25–20	25–20	25–15			75–55	

===== 11th place =====
Date	Time		Score		Set 1	Set 2	Set 3	Set 4	Set 5	Total	Report
23 July	09:30	University of Jyväskylä (Finland)	3–2	(Israel) Ben-Gurion University	25–14	25–19	19–25	21–25	15–6	105–89	

===== 9th place =====
Date	Time		Score		Set 1	Set 2	Set 3	Set 4	Set 5	Total	Report
23 July	12:00	University of Valencia (Spain)	3–1	(Netherlands) University of Groningen	25–23	20–25	25–22	25–22		95–92	

==== Championship bracket ====
Fifth place
D2	(Portugal) University of Porto	1
A2	(Germany) Technical Univ. of Munich	3
Seventh place
A1	(Croatia) University of Zagreb	0
B2	(Germany) University of Würzburg	3

Consolation semifinals
A1	(Croatia) University of Zagreb	2
D2	(Portugal) University of Porto	3
A2	(Germany) Technical Univ. of Munich	3
B2	(Germany) University of Würzburg	2

Quarterfinals
A1	(Croatia) University of Zagreb	0
C2	(Serbia) University of Niš	3
B1	(Spain) University of Almeria	3
D2	(Portugal) University of Porto	1
C1	(United Kingdom) Northumbria University	3
A2	(Germany) Technical Univ. of Munich	2
D1	(France) Univ. of Nice Sophia Antipolis	3
B2	(Germany) University of Würzburg	0

Semifinals
C2	(Serbia) University of Niš	0
B1	(Spain) University of Almeria	3
C1	(United Kingdom) Northumbria University	1
D1	(France) Univ. of Nice Sophia Antipolis	3

Final
B1	(Spain) University of Almeria	0
D1	(France) Univ. of Nice Sophia Antipolis	3
Third place
C2	(Serbia) University of Niš	3
C1	(United Kingdom) Northumbria University	1

===== Quarterfinals =====
Date	Time		Score		Set 1	Set 2	Set 3	Set 4	Set 5	Total	Report
22 July	09:30	University of Zagreb (Croatia)	0–3	(Serbia) University of Niš	19–25	30–32	16–25			65–82	
22 July	12:00	Northumbria University (United Kingdom)	3–2	(Germany) Technical Univ. of Munich	24–26	25–21	28–30	25–19	15–3	117–99	
22 July	17:30	University of Almeria (Spain)	3–1	(Portugal) University of Porto	25–18	25–23	22–25	25–14		97–80	
22 July	20:00	Univ. of Nice Sophia Antipolis (France)	3–0	(Germany) University of Würzburg	25–15	25–20	25–16			75–51	

===== Classification (5th–8th) =====
Date	Time		Score		Set 1	Set 2	Set 3	Set 4	Set 5	Total	Report
23 July	09:30	University of Zagreb (Croatia)	2–3	(Portugal) University of Porto	25–19	21–25	13–25	25–16	13–15	97–100	
23 July	12:00	Technical Univ. of Munich (Germany)	3–2	(Germany) University of Würzburg	25–18	25–14	19–25	12–25	15–11	96–93	

===== Semifinals =====
Date	Time		Score		Set 1	Set 2	Set 3	Set 4	Set 5	Total	Report
23 July	17:30	University of Niš (Serbia)	0–3	(Spain) University of Almeria	23–25	30–32	22–25			75–82	
23 July	20:00	Northumbria University (United Kingdom)	1–3	(France) Univ. of Nice Sophia Antipolis	25–23	15–25	25–19	18–25		83–92	

===== 7th place =====
Date	Time		Score		Set 1	Set 2	Set 3	Set 4	Set 5	Total	Report
24 July	09:00	University of Zagreb (Croatia)	0–3	(Germany) University of Würzburg	17–25	17–25	20–25			54–75	

===== 5th place =====
Date	Time		Score		Set 1	Set 2	Set 3	Set 4	Set 5	Total	Report
24 July	11:30	University of Porto (Portugal)	1–3	(Germany) Technical Univ. of Munich	19–25	17–25	25–27	18–25		79–102	

===== 3rd place =====
Date	Time		Score		Set 1	Set 2	Set 3	Set 4	Set 5	Total	Report
24 July	14:00	University of Niš (Serbia)	3–1	(United Kingdom) Northumbria University	25–20	20–25	25–20	25–22		95–87	

===== Final =====
Date	Time		Score		Set 1	Set 2	Set 3	Set 4	Set 5	Total	Report
24 July	20:00	University of Almeria (Spain)	0–3	(France) Univ. of Nice Sophia Antipolis	15–25	22–25	19–25			56–75	

=== Final standing ===
Rank	Team
1st place, gold medalist(s)	(France) University of Nice Sophia Antipolis
2nd place, silver medalist(s)	(Spain) University of Almería
3rd place, bronze medalist(s)	(Serbia) University of Niš
4	(United Kingdom) Northumbria University
5	(Germany) Technical University of Munich
6	(Portugal) University of Porto
7	(Germany) University of Würzburg
8	(Croatia) University of Zagreb
9	(Spain) University of Valencia
10	(Netherlands) University of Groningen
11	(Finland) University of Jyväskylä
12	(Israel) Ben-Gurion University of the Negev
13	(Turkey) Gazi University
14	(Romania) University of Bacău
15	(Croatia) University of Split

== Women's tournament ==
=== Pools composition ===
Pool A	Pool B	Pool C	Pool D
(Croatia) University of Zagreb (Finland) Tampere University of Technology (Germany) Technical University of Munich (Ukraine) Ternopil National Economic University	(Germany) German Sport University Cologne (Portugal) University of Minho (Estonia) Tallinn University (Slovenia) University of Ljubljana	(Romania) University of Bacău (Switzerland) University of Lausanne (United Kingdom) Northumbria University (Croatia) University of Osijek	(Serbia) University of Belgrade (Poland) Wroclaw University of Environmental and Life Sciences (Germany) University of Regensburg (Bosnia and Herzegovina) University of Banja Luka

=== Preliminary round ===
- All times are Central European Daylight Time–(UTC+02:00)

==== Pool A ====
Pos	Team	Pld	W	L	Pts	SW	SL	SR	SPW	SPL	SPR	Qualification
1	(Croatia) University of Zagreb	3	3	0	7	9	4	2.250	275	254	1.083	Quarterfinals
2	(Germany) Technical University of Munich	3	2	1	6	8	5	1.600	293	242	1.211	Quarterfinals
3	(Ukraine) TNEU	3	1	2	5	7	6	1.167	275	264	1.042	
4	(Finland) Tampere University of Technology	3	0	3	0	0	9	0.000	142	225	0.631	

Date	Time		Score		Set 1	Set 2	Set 3	Set 4	Set 5	Total	Report
18 July	17:30	University of Zagreb (Croatia)	3–2	(Ukraine) TNEU	25–16	25–23	16–25	23–25	15–7	104–96	
18 July	20:00	Tampere University of Tech (Finland)	0–3	(Germany) Technical Univ. of Munich	17–25	11–25	14–25			42–75	
19 July	17:30	TNEU (Ukraine)	2–3	(Germany) Technical Univ. of Munich	26–24	23–25	25–22	24–26	6–15	104–112	
19 July	20:00	University of Zagreb (Croatia)	3–0	(Finland) Tampere University of Tech	25–19	25–19	25–14			75–52	
20 July	17:30	Tampere University of Tech (Finland)	0–3	(Ukraine) TNEU	14–25	19–25	15–25			48–75	
20 July	20:00	Technical Univ. of Munich (Germany)	2–3	(Croatia) University of Zagreb	22–25	25–16	25–15	21–25	13–15	106–96	

==== Pool B ====
Pos	Team	Pld	W	L	Pts	SW	SL	SR	SPW	SPL	SPR	Qualification
1	(Germany) German Sport University Cologne	3	3	0	9	9	2	4.500	267	199	1.342	Quarterfinals
2	(Portugal) University of Minho	3	2	1	5	7	6	1.167	280	274	1.022	Quarterfinals
3	(Slovenia) University of Ljubljana	3	1	2	4	5	6	0.833	225	231	0.974	
4	(Estonia) Tallinn University	3	0	3	0	2	9	0.222	192	260	0.738	

Date	Time		Score		Set 1	Set 2	Set 3	Set 4	Set 5	Total	Report
18 July	09:30	German Sport University Cologne (Germany)	3–0	(Slovenia) University of Ljubljana	25–23	25–14	25–11			75–48	
18 July	12:00	University of Minho (Portugal)	3–1	(Estonia) Tallinn University	25–16	17–25	25–21	25–11		92–73	
19 July	09:30	University of Ljubljana (Slovenia)	3–0	(Estonia) Tallinn University	25–15	26–24	25–13			76–52	
19 July	12:00	German Sport University Cologne (Germany)	3–1	(Portugal) University of Minho	25–27	25–20	25–19	25–18		100–84	
20 July	09:30	University of Minho (Portugal)	3–2	(Slovenia) University of Ljubljana	19–25	25–19	20–25	25–22	15–10	104–101	
20 July	12:00	Tallinn University (Estonia)	1–3	(Germany) German Sport University Cologne	25–17	15–25	10–25	17–25		67–92	

==== Pool C ====
Pos	Team	Pld	W	L	Pts	SW	SL	SR	SPW	SPL	SPR	Qualification
1	(Romania) University of Bacău	3	3	0	9	9	1	9.000	248	191	1.298	Quarterfinals
2	(Switzerland) University of Lausanne	3	2	1	6	6	4	1.500	228	209	1.091	Quarterfinals
3	(United Kingdom) Northumbria University	3	1	2	3	4	7	0.571	239	260	0.919	
4	(Croatia) University of Osijek	3	0	3	0	2	9	0.222	214	269	0.796	

Date	Time		Score		Set 1	Set 2	Set 3	Set 4	Set 5	Total	Report
18 July	09:30	University of Bacău (Romania)	3–1	(Croatia) University of Osijek	23–25	25–19	25–16	25–21		98–81	
18 July	12:00	University of Lausanne (Switzerland)	3–1	(United Kingdom) Northumbria University	27–25	23–25	25–23	25–13		100–86	
19 July	09:30	University of Osijek (Croatia)	1–3	(United Kingdom) Northumbria University	17–25	25–21	22–25	21–25		85–96	
19 July	12:00	University of Bacău (Romania)	3–0	(Switzerland) University of Lausanne	25–17	25–15	25–21			75–53	
20 July	09:30	University of Lausanne (Switzerland)	3–0	(Croatia) University of Osijek	25–9	25–21	25–18			75–48	
20 July	12:00	Northumbria University (United Kingdom)	0–3	(Romania) University of Bacău	21–25	15–25	21–25			57–75	

==== Pool D ====
Pos	Team	Pld	W	L	Pts	SW	SL	SR	SPW	SPL	SPR	Qualification
1	(Serbia) University of Belgrade	3	3	0	9	9	1	9.000	248	172	1.442	Quarterfinals
2	(Bosnia and Herzegovina) University of Banja Luka	3	2	1	6	7	3	2.333	222	190	1.168	Quarterfinals
3	(Germany) University of Regensburg	3	1	2	3	3	6	0.500	171	206	0.830	
4	(Poland) WUELS	3	0	3	0	0	9	0.000	152	225	0.676	

Date	Time		Score		Set 1	Set 2	Set 3	Set 4	Set 5	Total	Report
18 July	17:30	University of Belgrade (Serbia)	3–1	(Bosnia and Herzegovina) University of Banja Luka	25–22	23–25	25–15	25–10		98–72	
18 July	20:00	WUELS (Poland)	0–3	(Germany) University of Regensburg	15–25	18–25	23–25			56–75	
19 July	17:30	University of Banja Luka (Bosnia and Herzegovina)	3–0	(Germany) University of Regensburg	25–17	25–12	25–17			75–46	
19 July	20:00	University of Belgrade (Serbia)	3–0	(Poland) WUELS	25–15	25–20	25–15			75–50	
20 July	17:30	WUELS (Poland)	0–3	(Bosnia and Herzegovina) University of Banja Luka	13–25	13–25	20–25			46–75	
20 July	20:00	University of Regensburg (Germany)	0–3	(Serbia) University of Belgrade	17–25	16–25	17–25			50–75	

=== Playoff round ===
==== 9th–16th bracket ====
13th place
A3	(Ukraine) TNEU	3
D3	(Germany) University of Regensburg	2
15th place
D4	(Poland) WUELS	3
A4	(Finland) Tampere Univ. of Technology	0

13th–16th
A3	(Ukraine) TNEU	3
D4	(Poland) WUELS	0
A4	(Finland) Tampere Univ. of Technology	0
D3	(Germany) University of Regensburg	3

Classification
A3	(Ukraine) TNEU	0
C4	(Croatia) University of Osijek	3
B3	(Slovenia) University of Ljubljana	3
D4	(Poland) WUELS	0
C3	(United Kingdom) Northumbria University	3
A4	(Finland) Tampere Univ. of Technology	0
D3	(Germany) University of Regensburg	1
B4	(Estonia) Tallinn University	3

9th–12th
C4	(Croatia) University of Osijek	3
B3	(Slovenia) University of Ljubljana	0
C3	(United Kingdom) Northumbria University	3
B4	(Estonia) Tallinn University	0

9th place
C4	(Croatia) University of Osijek	3
C3	(United Kingdom) Northumbria University	2
11th place
B3	(Slovenia) University of Ljubljana	1
B4	(Estonia) Tallinn University	3

===== Classification =====
Date	Time		Score		Set 1	Set 2	Set 3	Set 4	Set 5	Total	Report
22 July	09:30	TNEU (Ukraine)	0–3	(Croatia) University of Osijek	21–25	20–25	23–25			64–75	
22 July	12:00	Northumbria University (United Kingdom)	3–0	(Finland) Tampere University of Tech.	25–10	25–9	25–19			75–38	
22 July	17:30	University of Ljubljana (Slovenia)	3–0	(Poland) WUELS	25–20	25–23	25–18			75–61	
22 July	20:00	University of Regensburg (Germany)	1–3	(Estonia) Tallinn University	25–18	20–25	21–25	21–25		87–93	

===== 13th–16th Playoffs =====
Date	Time		Score		Set 1	Set 2	Set 3	Set 4	Set 5	Total	Report
23 July	09:30	TNEU (Ukraine)	3–0	(Poland) WUELS	25–7	25–16	25–14			75–37	
23 July	12:00	Tampere University of Tech. (Finland)	0–3	(Germany) University of Regensburg	14–25	13–25	18–25			45–75	

===== 9th–12th Playoffs =====
Date	Time		Score		Set 1	Set 2	Set 3	Set 4	Set 5	Total	Report
23 July	17:30	University of Osijek (Croatia)	3–0	(Slovenia) University of Ljubljana	25–11	25–19	25–20			75–50	
23 July	20:00	Northumbria University (United Kingdom)	3–0	(Estonia) Tallinn University	25–20	25–16	26–24			76–60	

==== Championship bracket ====
Fifth place
D2	(Bosnia and Herzegovina) University of Banja Luka	1
A2	(Germany) Technical Univ. of Munich	3
Seventh place
A1	(Croatia) University of Zagreb	1
B2	(Portugal) University of Minho	3

Consolation semifinals
A1	(Croatia) University of Zagreb	0
D2	(Bosnia and Herzegovina) University of Banja Luka	3
A2	(Germany) Technical Univ. of Munich	3
B2	(Portugal) University of Minho	0

Quarterfinals
A1	(Croatia) University of Zagreb	2
C2	(Switzerland) University of Lausanne	3
B1	(Germany) German Sport Univ. Cologne	3
D2	(Bosnia and Herzegovina) University of Banja Luka	0
C1	(Romania) University of Bacău	3
A2	(Germany) Technical Univ. of Munich	0
D1	(Serbia) University of Belgrade	3
B2	(Portugal) University of Minho	1

Semifinals
C2	(Switzerland) University of Lausanne	3
B1	(Germany) German Sport Univ. Cologne	1
C1	(Romania) University of Bacău	3
D1	(Serbia) University of Belgrade	2

Final
C2	(Switzerland) University of Lausanne	1
C1	(Romania) University of Bacău	3
Third place
B1	(Germany) German Sport Univ. Cologne	1
D1	(Serbia) University of Belgrade	3

===== Quarterfinals =====
Date	Time		Score		Set 1	Set 2	Set 3	Set 4	Set 5	Total	Report
22 July	09:30	University of Zagreb (Croatia)	2–3	(Switzerland) University of Lausanne	20–25	25–14	24–26	26–24	9–15	104–104	
22 July	12:00	University of Bacău (Romania)	3–0	(Germany) Technical Univ. of Munich	25–20	25–21	25–20			75–61	
22 July	17:30	German Sport Univ. Cologne (Germany)	3–0	(Bosnia and Herzegovina) University of Banja Luka	25–12	25–14	25–8			75–34	
22 July	20:00	University of Belgrade (Serbia)	3–1	(Portugal) University of Minho	25–17	22–25	25–17	25–16		97–75	

===== 5th–8th Playoffs =====
Date	Time		Score		Set 1	Set 2	Set 3	Set 4	Set 5	Total	Report
23 July	09:30	University of Zagreb (Croatia)	0–3	(Bosnia and Herzegovina) University of Banja Luka	22–25	16–25	23–25			61–75	
23 July	12:00	Technical Univ. of Munich (Germany)	3–0	(Portugal) University of Minho	25–17	25–20	25–20			75–57	

===== Semifinals =====
Date	Time		Score		Set 1	Set 2	Set 3	Set 4	Set 5	Total	Report
23 July	17:30	University of Lausanne (Switzerland)	3–1	(Germany) German Sport Univ. Cologne	22–25	25–16	25–19	25–17		97–77	
23 July	20:00	University of Bacău (Romania)	3–2	(Serbia) University of Belgrade	15–25	25–27	25–22	25–14	15–4	105–92	

==== Final classification ====
===== 15th place =====
Date	Time		Score		Set 1	Set 2	Set 3	Set 4	Set 5	Total	Report
24 July	09:30	WUELS (Poland)	3–0	(Finland) Tampere University of Tech.	25–23	25–21	25–17			75–61	

===== 13th place =====
Date	Time		Score		Set 1	Set 2	Set 3	Set 4	Set 5	Total	Report
24 July	09:30	TNEU (Ukraine)	3–2	(Germany) University of Regensburg	25–14	22–25	25–11	23–25	15–6	110–81	

===== 11th place =====
Date	Time		Score		Set 1	Set 2	Set 3	Set 4	Set 5	Total	Report
24 July	12:00	University of Ljubljana (Slovenia)	1–3	(Estonia) Tallinn University	18–25	12–25	25–6	12–25		67–81	

===== 9th place =====
Date	Time		Score		Set 1	Set 2	Set 3	Set 4	Set 5	Total	Report
24 July	14:30	University of Osijek (Croatia)	3–2	(United Kingdom) Northumbria University	25–16	14–25	25–22	18–25	15–3	97–91	

===== 7th place =====
Date	Time		Score		Set 1	Set 2	Set 3	Set 4	Set 5	Total	Report
24 July	08:30	University of Zagreb (Croatia)	1–3	(Portugal) University of Minho	25–27	19–25	25–23	25–27		94–102	

===== 5th place =====
Date	Time		Score		Set 1	Set 2	Set 3	Set 4	Set 5	Total	Report
24 July	11:00	University of Banja Luka (Bosnia and Herzegovina)	1–3	(Germany) Technical Univ. of Munich	10–25	25–22	16–25	18–25		69–97	

===== 3rd place =====
Date	Time		Score		Set 1	Set 2	Set 3	Set 4	Set 5	Total	Report
24 July	13:30	German Sport Univ. Cologne (Germany)	1–3	(Serbia) University of Belgrade	25–10	18–25	19–25	20–25		82–85	

===== Final =====
Date	Time		Score		Set 1	Set 2	Set 3	Set 4	Set 5	Total	Report
24 July	17:30	University of Lausanne (Switzerland)	1–3	(Romania) University of Bacău	19–25	25–12	23–25	23–25		90–87	

=== Final standing ===
Rank	Team
1st place, gold medalist(s)	(Romania) University of Bacău
2nd place, silver medalist(s)	(Switzerland) University of Lausanne
3rd place, bronze medalist(s)	(Serbia) University of Belgrade
4	(Germany) German Sport University Cologne
5	(Germany) Technical University of Munich
6	(Bosnia and Herzegovina) University of Banja Luka
7	(Portugal) University of Minho
8	(Croatia) University of Zagreb
9	(Croatia) University of Osijek
10	(United Kingdom) Northumbria University
11	(Estonia) Tallinn University
12	(Slovenia) University of Ljubljana
13	(Ukraine) Ternopil National Economic University
14	(Germany) University of Regensburg
15	(Poland) Wroclaw University of Environmental and Life Sciences
16	(Finland) Tampere University of Technology
