= Alfred Nobel University =

Private university in Dnipro, Ukraine

- Університет імені АЛЬФРЕДА НОБЕЛЯ
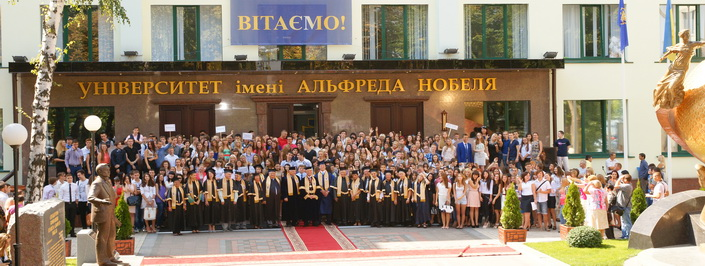
- Motto: Education for Life
- Type: Private university
- Established: September, 1993
- Affiliations: Magna Charta Universitatum, EUA, IAU
- Rector: Borys Kholod
- Location: Dnipro, Ukraine; 48.4720°N 35.0427°E
- Website: duan.edu.ua/en
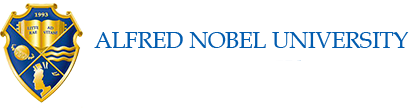

Alfred Nobel University, Ukraine (Ukrainian: Університет імені Альфреда Нобеля) is a private higher educational institution in the city of Dnipro. It has the IV level of accreditation.

== History ==
Alfred Nobel University was founded in 1993 as a private higher education institution with a focus on management and economics. Until 2010, it was known as "University of Economics and Law, Dnipropetrovsk". From the start, it was the central mission of DUAN to meet the demands of the Ukrainian labour market – especially small and medium-size enterprises – for qualified personnel with a background in Management, Economics and Law and additional skills required in a competitive and possibly multinational business environment. Since its foundation, the university has continuously expanded its portfolio of study programmes: currently, 16 Bachelor programmes and 18 Master programmes are on offer, including an MBA programme for professionals, as well as a smaller number of doctoral and postdoctoral programmes.

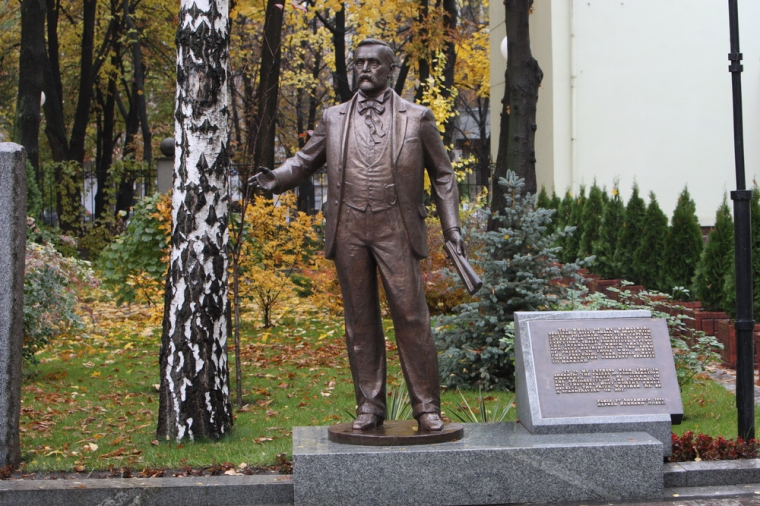
The monument to Alfred Nobel at the Alfred Nobel Planet memorial park

In October, 2010 the university was renamed in honour of Alfred Nobel — the founder of the Nobel Prize — for a weighty contribution to promoting Nobel movement in Ukraine through holding events connected with spreading Nobel ideas and became Alfred Nobel University.

In recent years, university has focused particularly on introducing programmes beyond the disciplinary boundaries of Economics and Law, such as Psychology, Political Studies and Social Work.

In the year 2015-16, about 3.400 students were enrolled at Alfred Nobel University, about 20% of who study at Master's level.

In total, the number of faculty amounts to about 150 persons, including full- and part-time teachers.

The large majority of DUAN students is recruited from the city of Dnipro or the surrounding area. Most graduates find employment on the local market.

== International Nobel Congresses ==
International Nobel Congresses have been held at Alfred Nobel University since 2008.

The First Nobel Economic Forum "The Global Economy of the XXI century: Cycles and Crises" was held on 11–13 September 2008 and welcomed more than one hundred participants from different regions of Ukraine, Romania, Russia, the USA, Poland. In the course of four plenary sessions and two workshop sessions participants discussed global issues of cyclical development, the forecast of the development of world civilization up to 2050, the transformation of economic, social and cultural dimensions, philosophy of modern society and the human factor in economic development, globalization and regionalism etc.

The Second Nobel International Economic Forum "The World Economy in the XXI Century: Cycles and Crises" held on 19–22 May 2010 was devoted to general problems, determined by the motto: Innovation as a basis for overcoming the global crisis. Its goals were attracting young people to research the economies of countries on the basis of the work of Nobel laureates, forging real creative contacts between young researchers from around the world. The forum combined the intellectual efforts of over 200 participants from all over Ukraine, as well as the CIS and foreign countries: Russia, Poland, the USA, Germany, Austria, Romania, Armenia, Italy, France, Spain, Oman and other countries. The central question of the forum was the problem of using fundamental innovations as a basis for overcoming the consequences of the economic crisis in the context of the ideas of Friedrich von Hayek, Nobel Laureate in Economics in 1974.

The Third Nobel International Economic Forum was held in 2012. Its plenary sessions and sections were devoted to the discussion of the pressing topic "The Role of Economic Science in Forming National Strategies". The main speakers were Alexander Ermolaev director, National Institute of Strategic Studies under the president of Ukraine), Grzegorz Kołodko (former deputy prime minister of the Republic of Poland, professor of Economics, director of the Research Institute for "TIGER" Kozminski University, Warsaw), Max Alier (official representative of the IMF in Ukraine) and other leaders of national economic institutions and some of the world's most eminent economists, from Ukraine, Russia, Belarus, Kazakhstan, Romania, Poland, Montenegro".

The Fourth Nobel International Economic Forum was held in 2014. More than 120 scientists from nine countries (Kazakhstan, Belarus, Poland, Russia, Austria, Sweden, India, the USA and Ukraine) provided materials. The congress was divided in two areas: the real and virtual. In the virtual part was the transcontinental online workshop "Modern Education: Challenges of the cross-cultural communication" (Ukraine - USA) with Dr. J. Johnson (Walden University, USA), Dr. Svetlana Buko (Ukraine), and (over Skype ) Dr. Boyd Johnson (Illinois, USA). Events of this seminar were important for students of international economics English programmes, as well as for other economic areas.

The Fifth International Nobel Congress devoted to “Peacebuilding and educational mission of Nobel Laureates in Modern Global Conditions” was held in 2016. The Congress started precisely on September 21 — the International Day of Peace — as its mission is to achieve peace-building and education goals. According to the decision of the university's Academic Council the ceremonial conferral of the title of and attributes of the emeritus professors of Alfred Nobel University took place on September 22, 2016 during the ceremony at the memorial park complex “Alfred Nobel Planet”. The title and attributes were awarded to His Excellency Gerardo Angel Bugallo Ottone, Ambassador Extraordinary and Plenipotentiary of the Kingdom of Spain to Ukraine, Professor Michael Nobel, philanthropist and entrepreneur, multi-year president of the Nobel Family Society, co-founder of the Nobel Charitable Trust (Sweden), as well as Dr. Bob Johnson, head of Independent Commission of the European Council for Business Education (ECBE).

== Accreditation ==
- ZEvA - Central Evaluation and Accreditation Agency (Germany)
- ECBE
- University of Wales Trinity St David (UK)

== Programmes ==
=== English-medium programmes ===
- Preparatory language course
- Alfred Nobel University and The University of Occupational Safety Management in Katowice, Poland:

BA in English Philology

Alfred Nobel University & Cyprus Institute of Marketing:

- BA in Marketing Management,
- BA in Tourism Management,
- BA in Financial Management and Computer technologies

=== Ukrainian-medium programmes ===
- Preparatory language course, (Ukrainian, Russian)
- Bachelor's degree (4 years)
- Master's degree (1,5 years)
- PhD programmes: Professional Education, Economics, Management, Entrepreneurship, Trading and Exchange activities

== See also ==
- Kharkiv College of Textile and Design
- American-Ukrainian School of Computer Sciences and Technologies
- BIONIC University
