= Ivan Yakovlevich Yukhimenko =

Ukrainian actor

Ivan Yakovlevich Yukhimenko (Ukrainian: Іван Якович Юхименко; 2 October 1892, Kharkiv – 6 February 1943, Kazan) was a Soviet actor, director and teacher, Merited Artist of Ukrainian SSR. It is thought that he died during the Kharkiv tragedy.
