= Sergii Kudlaienko =

Ukrainian politician and economist (born 1975)

Serhii Kudlaienko
- Сергій Володимирович Кудлаєнко
- Kudlaienko in 2014

People's Deputy of Ukraine
- In office 27 November 2014 – 29 August 2019
- Constituency: 63rd on the party list

Personal details
- Born: 13 October 1975 (age 51) Vinnytsia, Ukrainian SSR, Soviet Union
- Party: Independent
- Other political affiliations: Petro Poroshenko Bloc (2014–2019); European Solidarity (2020)
- Education: Kyiv National University of Trade and Economics; National Academy for Public Administration; Ternopil National Economic University
- Profession: Politician, economist

Serhii Volodymyrovych Kudlaienko (Ukrainian: Сергій Володимирович Кудлаєнко; born 13 October 1975) is a Ukrainian politician and economist who served as a People's Deputy of Ukraine in the 8th Ukrainian Verkhovna Rada from 2014 to 2019. During his parliamentary tenure, he was the deputy chairman of the Committee on State Building, Regional Policy, and Local Self-Government.

== Early life and education ==
Kudlaienko was born on 13 October 1975 in Vinnytsia, Ukraine. After graduating from secondary school, he studied at the Vinnytsia Technical College of Electronic Devices, earning a diploma in radio equipment manufacturing.

In 2003, he graduated from the Vinnytsia Trade and Economics Institute of the Kyiv National University of Trade and Economics with a degree in accounting and audit. He subsequently obtained a master's degree in public administration from the Odesa Regional Institute of Public Administration of the National Academy for Public Administration under the President of Ukraine in 2010, and completed legal studies at Ternopil National Economic University.

In 2012, Kudlaienko defended his candidate dissertation at Khmelnytskyi National University, receiving the Candidate of Economic Sciences degree. In 2019, he defended his doctoral thesis, obtaining the degree of Doctor of Economic Sciences.

== Career ==
=== Local government ===
From 2006 to 2011, Kudlaienko held administrative positions in the Vinnytsia City Council, heading municipal divisions overseeing trade, consumer market regulation, and public services. Between 2011 and 2014, he served as the director of the Department of Administrative Services of the Vinnytsia City Council, where he was involved in establishing municipal administrative service centers (TsNAP).

=== Parliamentary tenure ===
In the 2014 Ukrainian parliamentary election, Kudlaienko was elected to the Verkhovna Rada (8th convocation) on the party list of the Petro Poroshenko Bloc (placed 63rd). He assumed office on 27 November 2014.

In parliament, Kudlaienko served as deputy chairman of the Committee on State Building, Regional Policy, and Local Self-Government. His legislative work focused on the decentralization reform, local government powers, and administrative service modernization.

In the 2019 Ukrainian parliamentary election, Kudlaienko ran for re-election as an independent candidate in majority electoral district No. 11 (Vinnytsia), but did not secure a mandate.

=== Later activities ===
In the 2020 local elections, Kudlaienko was the mayoral candidate for Vinnytsia nominated by the European Solidarity party. He finished second in the race with approximately 13.2% of the vote, behind incumbent mayor Serhiy Morhunov.

In 2021, he was appointed director of the municipal enterprise Vinnytsia Airport. Kudlaienko also conducts academic work as a faculty member at the Vinnytsia Trade and Economics Institute and heads the Vinnytsia city branch of the non-governmental organization "My – Vinnychany".

== Personal life ==
Kudlaienko is married to Tetiana Kudlaienko. The couple has two sons.
