= American-Ukrainian School of Computer Sciences and Technologies =

Academic institution in Ternopil, Ukraine

American-Ukrainian School of Computer Science
- Type: Public
- Established: April 16, 2004
- Director: Ihor Paliy
- Head: Director
- Location: Ternopil, Ternopil, Ukraine
- Website: http://www.umcs.maine.edu/~aus

American-Ukrainian School of Computer Science was founded on April 16, 2004 as the result of cooperation between Ternopil National Economic University (TNEU) and University of Maine (UMaine). It is the first school in Ukraine of such type, where education is provided in English and Ukrainian, involving lecturers from the American universities, representing the Peace Corps. The school is acting as a structure within the Faculty of Computer Informational Technology at TNEU and is in Ternopil, Ukraine.

== History ==
American-Ukrainian School of Computer Science was established at April 16, 2004 as the result of collaboration of Ternopil National Economic University (Ukraine) and University of Maine (USA). Such collaboration become possible after one-year visit of professor Anatoly Sachenko (at that time dean of the Faculty of Computer Informational Technologies at TNEU) as the Fulbright professor to the University of Maine and Bowdoin College, both in Maine, in 2002–2003.

During his visit he discussed idea of creating of such school with professors George Markowsky (Department of Computer Science at UMaine) and Allan Tucker (Bowdoin College). After his return to Ukraine, a General Agreement of Cooperation was signed between TNEU and UMaine in 2003. And a year after that, school was established. Markowsky became first director of the school.

A year after that, Sachenko became director of the AUS. An agreement about cooperation was signed between TNEU and University of South Carolina Upstate in 2006.

== Benefits ==
- Students are studying according to the American (strong practical knowledge) and Ukrainian (strong fundamental knowledge) education standards;
- Education process is performing with the Computer Science;
- Best students (up to five) from the school yearly may study during a semester or two in UMaine;
- Education grants for studying abroad are available from UMaine;
- Transfer system allows students transfer to any AUS partner university.

== Partner universities ==
- University of Maine
- University of South Carolina Upstate
- American University in Bulgaria

== Education process ==
Students, according to their wishes, will have the opportunity to continue their studies at any partner university and get an American diploma in Computer Science after completing three academic years at AUS. After successful education completion in a partner university and gaining American bachelor's degree, alumni can continue studying at graduate school at a partner university and apply on master's or Ph.D. degree. AUS students who have neither possibilities nor desires to complete education in the U.S. study their fourth year in Ternopil and, after the successful examinations, obtain the Ukrainian bachelor's degree in Computer Science. Students can continue their education in the master department of TNEU or in foreign universities after the fourth year.

The lectures at the AUS are conducting by faculty from the U.S., European and Japanese universities, Peace Corps representatives and leading instructors of the Faculty of Computer Information Technologies.

== Student exchange ==
From the beginning of the school, the best students got the possibility to study in American universities.

- 2004−2005: Vitaliy Vitsentiy got a grant to study according to the Master program at UMaine. After graduating he continued studying as a Ph.D. student in Queensland University of Technology of Brisbane, Australia.
- 2008: AUS students Iuirii Ferents and Olexandr Shepchenko got grants to study in UMaine during spring 2009.
