= Wrocław University of Environmental and Life Sciences =

Agricultural university in Wrocław, Poland

- Uniwersytet Przyrodniczy we Wrocławiu
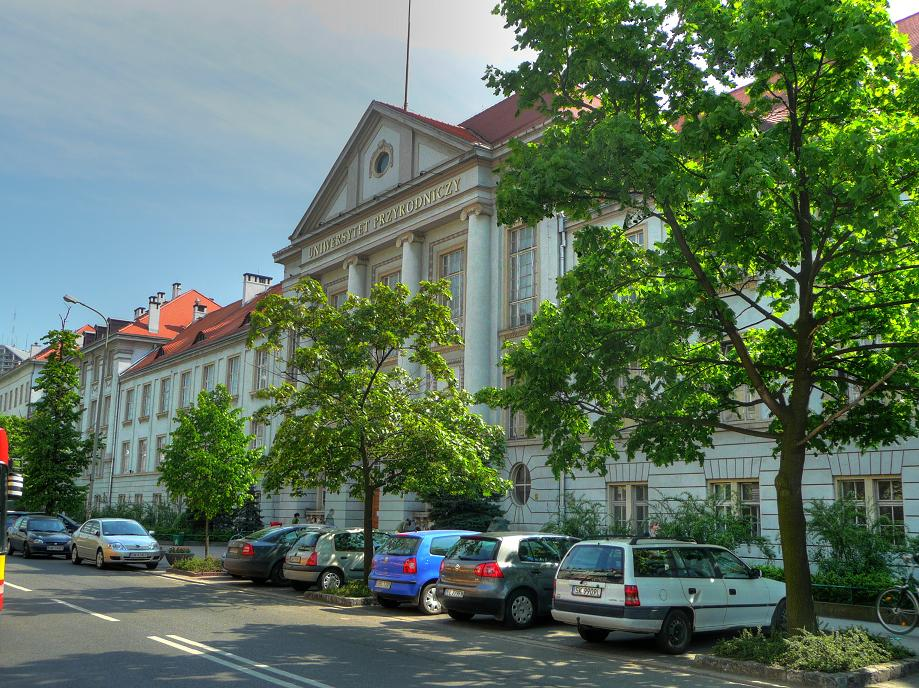
- Latin: Universitas Rerum Naturalium Wratislaviensis
- Type: public, undergraduate, graduate, postgraduate
- Established: November 17, 1951
- Rector: prof. dr hab. inż. Jarosław Bosy
- Academic staff: 740
- Students: 6,551 (12.2023)
- Postgraduates: Over 2 000 graduates each year
- Address: C. K. Norwida St. 25; 50-375 Wrocław, Wrocław, Lower Silesian Voivodeship, Poland; 51°6′40″N 17°3′50″E
- Website: www.upwr.edu.pl/en/

The Wrocław University of Environmental and Life Sciences (former Agricultural University and Agricultural Academy in Wrocław) is a state university in Wrocław, Poland, established as an independent university in 1951. It conducts training and research in the field of food, environmental and veterinary sciences.

In the comprehensive Perspektywy ranking of universities in Poland, in 2020 UPWr was placed second in the group of natural sciences and agricultural universities and 25th among all universities in the country. Two of its degree programmes – geodesy and cartography, and food science – have been voted the best in the country.

For several years, the university has been listed in the international Shanghai Ranking among the best universities in the world in the fields of: Food Science & Technology, Veterinary Science and Chemical Engineering.

== History ==
1856–1945. The Lviv Academy of Veterinary Medicine was established in 1881 as the third institution of this kind in Poland, alongside those in Vilnius and Warsaw. The Faculty of Agriculture dates back to 1856, when the Rural Agricultural School was opened in Dublany near Lvov, in the eastern outskirts of Poland. Initiated by the Galicia Parliament and later confirmed by the decree of the Minister of Agriculture, the school was transformed into the School of Agriculture, which later gained the status of the Polish Academy of Agriculture in 1901. The academy was incorporated into the Lviv Polytechnic, together with the School of Forestry, which resulted in the establishment of the Faculty of Agriculture and Forestry in 1919. The last transformation was decreed by the Council of Ministers.

Breslau. In 1881 the Institute of Agriculture was opened at the Royal University of Breslau. The address of the institute was 5 Mattiaplatz, and in 1923–1945 at 25 Hansastrasse (today C.K. Norwida Street), which is now the location of the main building of Wroclaw University of Environmental and Life Sciences. The academic research facilities and scholars were placed there to provide the foundation for future university development.

1945–1951 Wroclaw. On 24 August 1945 the State National Council signed a decree to establish a completely new institution of higher education called the State University and Polytechnic in Wroclaw. The university comprised ten faculties, having as parts the Faculty of Veterinary Medicine and the Faculty of Agriculture with the Gardening Division. The building of the Institute of Agriculture housed academic facilities and the scholars from the Faculty of Agriculture and Forestry of the Lvov Polytechnic, together with the professors of the Academy of Veterinary Medicine in Lwów who became the academic staff of the newly established university. In 1945, 302 students enrolled on the first year to study veterinary medicine and agriculture.

After 1951 the School of Agriculture was separated from the State University and Polytechnic in Wroclaw by a decree by the Council of Ministers on 17 November 1951 and became a separate entity. The newly created institution included four faculties: the Faculty of Agriculture, the Faculty of Veterinary Medicine, the Faculty of Water Reclamation and the Faculty of Zoology. The School of Agriculture gained the status of Wroclaw Academy of Agriculture on 28 September 1972 by a decree of the Council of Ministers. The government bill on 23 November 2006 nominated Wroclaw Academy of Agriculture as Wroclaw University of Environmental and Life Sciences. Currently, the university is an interdisciplinary institution with a focus on environment and nature studies. The structure of the university comprises five faculties and several interdepartmental units.

== Rectors ==
1. 1951–1954: prof. dr hab. Stanisław Tołpa – botanist
2. 1954–1955: prof. dr hab. Alfred Senze – physiopathologist
3. 1955–1959: prof. dr hab. Aleksander Tychowski – agricultural technologist
4. 1959–1965: prof. dr hab. Alfred Senze – physiopathologist
5. 1965–1969: prof. dr hab. Tadeusz Garbuliński – veterinary pharmacologist
6. 1969–1981: prof. dr hab. Ryszard Badura – veterinary surgeon
7. 1981–1981: prof. dr hab. Józef Dzieżyc – agrotechnician
8. 1982–1984: prof. dr hab. Henryk Balbierz – pathophysiologist
9. 1984–1986: prof. dr hab. Bronisław Jabłoński – agrotechnician
10. 1986–1990: prof. dr hab. Jerzy Juszczak – animal technician
11. 1990–1996: prof. dr hab. Jerzy Kowalski – hydrologist
12. 1996–2002: prof. dr hab. Tadeusz Szulc – animal technician
13. 2002–2008: prof. dr hab. Michał Mazurkiewicz – poultry pathologist
14. 2008–2016: prof. dr hab. Roman Kołacz – animal technician
15. 2016–2020: prof. dr hab. inż. Tadeusz Trziszka – food technologist
16. From 2020: prof. dr hab. inż. Jarosław Bosy – surveyor

== Courses of study ==
As of 2020 the university offers the possibility of studying in twenty-three first-cycle (bachelor's or engineering) and second-cycle (supplementary master's) majors and uniform master's studies at five faculties:

Faculty	Courses of study	Dean	Photo
The Faculty of Biology and Animal Science	food safety; bioinformatics; biology; human biology; zootechnics	dr hab. inż. Adam Roman, profesor uczelni	
Faculty of Biotechnology and Food Sciences	biotechnology; food Technology and human nutrition; quality management and food analysis; human nutrition; human nutrition and dietitian; technology and organization of gastronomy	dr hab. inż. Barbara Żarowska, profesor uczelni	
Faculty of Environmental Engineering and Geodesy	landscape architecture; construction; geodesy and cartography; spatial management; safety engineering; water engineering and management; environmental engineering	prof. dr hab. inż. Bernard Kontny	
Faculty of Veterinary Medicine	veterinary; veterinary medicine in English	dr hab. Stanisław Dzimira, profesor uczelni	
Faculty of Life Sciences and Technology	agribusiness; applied plant biotechnology; economy; plant medicine; environmental protection; renewable energy sources and waste management; gardening; agriculture; agricultural and forestry technology; management and production engineering	dr hab. inż. Bogdan Stępień, profesor uczelni	

== Possessed permissions and leading disciplines ==
The Wrocław University of Life Sciences is authorized to conduct first-cycle and second-cycle studies in 28 fields of study, conduct third-cycle studies (UPWr Doctoral School), and conduct post-graduate studies in seven leading disciplines in three fields:

- Field of Agricultural Sciences:
  - veterinary science
  - animal science and fisheries
  - agriculture and horticulture
  - nutrition and food technology
- The field of exact and natural sciences:
  - biological sciences
- Field of engineering and technical sciences:
  - environmental engineering, mining and energy
  - civil engineering and transport
