= Water polo at the 2016 European Universities Games =

Men's water polo
Tournament details
- Host country: Croatia
- Venue(s): 1 (in 1 host city)
- Dates: 12–16 July
- Teams: 12 (from 1 confederation)

The men's tournament of Water polo at the 2016 European Universities Games at Rijeka, Croatia, ran from July 12 until July 16, 2016. Games were held at the Kantrida polls.

== Group stage ==
=== Group A ===
Pos	Team	Pld	W	D	L	PF	PA	PD	Pts	Qualification	RIJ	EDI	LYO
1	(Croatia) University of Rijeka	0	0	0	0	0	0	0	0	Advance to semifinals	—		
2	(United Kingdom) University of Edinburgh	0	0	0	0	0	0	0	0	Placement 5-8		—	
3	(France) National institute of applied sciences Lyon	0	0	0	0	0	0	0	0	Placement 9-12			—

Source: LEN
