= Ihor Paliy =

Ihor Paliy (also spelled Igor Palii; Ukrainian: Ігор Палій; born 10 May 1963) is a contemporary Ukrainian painter, specialized in abstractionism, a combination of Abstract art and Realism. The technique he mainly uses is Oil on canvas. He is a member of the Community of Artists of Ukraine.

== Biography ==
Igor Palii was born on 10 May 1963 in Drohobych, a regional center of Western Ukraine, in a family of musicians and child care workers. In 1986 he finished faculty of architecture at Lviv Polytechnic National University. After graduation he was involved in various architectural projects combined with canvas painting.

=== Sakhalin period ===
In 1986, Igor Palii moved to Sakhalin island.

=== Polish period ===
Moved back to Kraków, Poland in 1992. In 1998 Palii’s first personal exhibition in Kraków was organized. Actively participates in Polish cultural life and charity campaigns. In 2004 Igor Palii participated in international Art auctions, where his oil-painted canvas "Bez Tytułu. 2001" ("Without A Title. 2001") was sold for 2,772 USD.

=== Turn to steel art ===
Since 2002 Igor Palii turned to new art stream beginning to create his own works of art made of steel. The main cause of such turn was the need of three-dimensional figures as an addition to Palii’s paintings in a current project. In order to fulfill his new vision, Igor Palii establishes his own small enterprise of steel art production. The new turn resulted in such projects as decoration of trade center “Sophia” in the west of Ukraine, restaurant “Flamingo” in Stryi, Ukraine, “Museum of Beer”, “Aivengo” in Lviv, Ukraine. In 1999-2000 creates and implements the project of restaurant-branch "Egypt" (Stryi, Ukraine).

== Achievements ==
- 1987: 3rd prize for the best interior of Sakhalin island. The same year initiated an exhibition "Painters of Sakhalin" in Okha, Russia
- 1988: 3rd prize for political illustrations in the city of Yuzhno-Sakhalinsk, Russia
- 1993: 1st personal exhibition in the Lviv National Art Gallery
- 1994: 2nd personal exhibition in the Lviv National Art Gallery
- 1994: Participated in collective exhibition "HungExpo", Budapest
- 1994: Participated in Ukrainian planner "Maidan 1994", Lviv, Ukraine
- 1995: Palii's exhibits his arts in 2nd collective exhibition, Budapest
- 1996: Starts his collaboration with "Barbara Krakow Gallery".
- 1996: Exhibits in galleries "Közület artistichnuj", "Labyrinth Gallery", "Galeria Kersten", Poland
- 2002: Participated in international exhibition in Cologne, Germany at Exhibition Center Köln
- 2003 - 2004: Personal exhibition in Dijon, France
- 2009 - 2011: Personal exhibition in Nice, France
- 2011 – Present: Palii exhibits canvases in Washington D.C., USA
