= Damir Boras =

Croatian information scientist and lexicographer

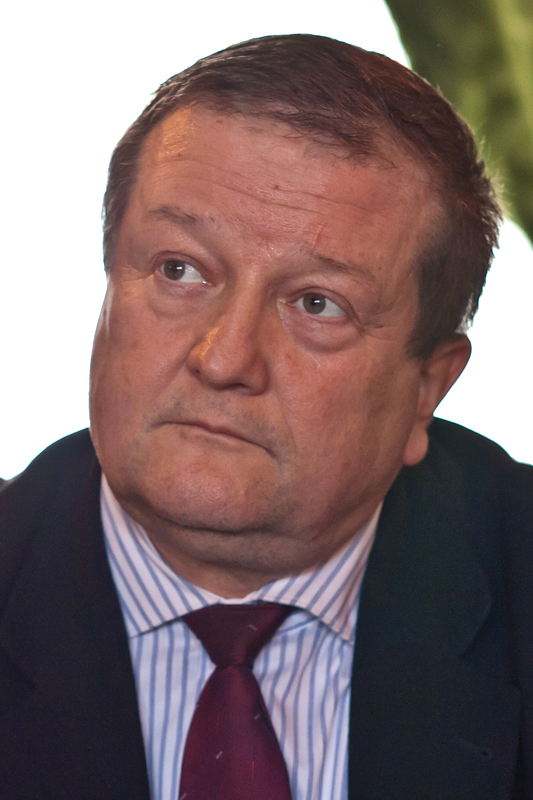
- Born: 25 October 1951 (age 74)
- Education: University of Zagreb
- Occupation: Academic
- Known for: Former Rector of the University of Zagreb

Damir Boras (born 25 October 1951) is a Croatian information scientist, university professor, former Rector of the University of Zagreb, and lexicographer.

== Early life and education ==
Boras was born in Zagreb. In 1998, he completed his doctorate at the Department of Information and Communication Sciences of the Faculty of Philosophy in Zagreb with a dissertation on "Theory and rules of text segmentation in the Croatian Language". He speaks English, French, German and Italian, and understands Slovenian, Macedonian, Latin, and Classical Greek.

== Academic career ==
Since 2007, Boras has been a member of the Senate of the University of Zagreb. From 2007 to 2014, he served on the Council of Social Sciences and Humanities. Since 2009, he has been a member of the Rector's College.

Outside the university, from 2000 to 2006, he was the deputy director for Digitisation and Scientific Cooperation at the Miroslav Krleže Lexicographic Institute, where he is currently a member of the Scientific Council. During his two terms as Dean of the Faculty of Philosophy, he chaired the Board of Directors of the Croatian Reporting News Agency (Hine) and the National Center for External Evaluation of Education (NCVVO).

=== Faculty of Philosophy ===
Boras has spent most of his professional life at the Faculty of Philosophy. He began his career as an assistant and was promoted to assistant professor in 1999, associate professor in 2003, and scientific advisor and full professor in 2006. In December 2011, during the fifth session of the Senate of the University of Zagreb, he was confirmed as a full professor with a permanent appointment.

Boras is one of the founders of the Department of Information Sciences (later renamed the Department of Information and Communication Sciences), and more broadly, a pioneer in introducing computer science education—both at the Faculty of Philosophy and generally within the Croatian educational system. He founded and headed the Department of Natural Language, Lexicography, and Encyclopedics at the Faculty of Philosophy. In 2004, he became the Vice-Dean for Science and International Cooperation and held this position until 2009, when he was elected the first Dean of the Faculty of Philosophy. At the end of his second term as Dean, he was elected Rector of the University of Zagreb, serving in this capacity for two continuous terms, 2014-2022. Since 2011, he has also taught at the Faculty of Philosophy at the University of Mostar.

== Journal editor ==
Since 2007, Boras has been editor-in-chief of the International Scientific Journal of Lexicography and Encyclopedics Studio Lexicographica of the Lexicographic Institute Miroslav Krleža, and member of the editorial board of the International Journal of Education and Pedagogy. He is also an editor for the International Scientific Journal of Media, Journalism, Mass Communication, Public Relations, Culture and Society, published by the University of Dubrovnik.

== Memberships ==
Boras is a member of the European Academy of Sciences and Arts. He serves as Vice President of Inter-University Centre (IUC) in Dubrovnik, President of the Executive Committee of the Regional Platform for Assessing and Cooperation in Higher Education and Research and Vice President at the Croatian Pan-European Union. He is also a member of the Education, Science and Culture Committee and the Croatian Academy of Engineering.

== Selected publications ==
- Jandrić, Petar; Boras, Damir. Kritičko e-obrazovanje: borba za moć i značenje u umreženom društvu. Zagreb: Technical Polytechnic in Zagreb and Faculty of Humanities and Social Sciences, University of Zagreb FF Press, 2012.
- Lasić-Lazić, Jadranka; László, Marija; Boras, Damir. Informacijsko čitanje. Zagreb: Department of Information Studies Department of Information Sciences, Faculty of Humanities and Social Sciences, University of Zagreb, 2008.
- Boras, Damir; Dovedan, Zdravko. Informatika za 1. razred srednjih škola. Zagreb: Školska knjiga, 1992.

== Awards ==
Boras won the City of Zagreb Award in 2016 and the Večernjak's Seal Award in the science category in 2018. In 2019, he received the Golden Coat of Arms of the Municipality of Ljubuski, and the Juan Vucetich Award. In 2022, he was awarded an Honorary Doctorate from the University of Mostar.

== Personal life and family ==
Boras's grandfather, Marko Kalogjera, was the first bishop of the Croatian Old Catholic Church. His father, Mile Boras (1923–1997), was a professor of Roman law. His uncle, Drazen Kalogjere, was a professor of economics.

Boras is married to Alena Boras and they have a daughter named Dora. He used to play rugby in the First League club Lokomotiva of Zagreb's Kajzerica neighbourhood. He also used to play basketball and tennis.
