= West Ukrainian National University =

Public university in Ternopil, Ukraine

Coordinates: 49.5536°N 25.5617°E

- ДЗВО "Західноукраїнський національний університет"
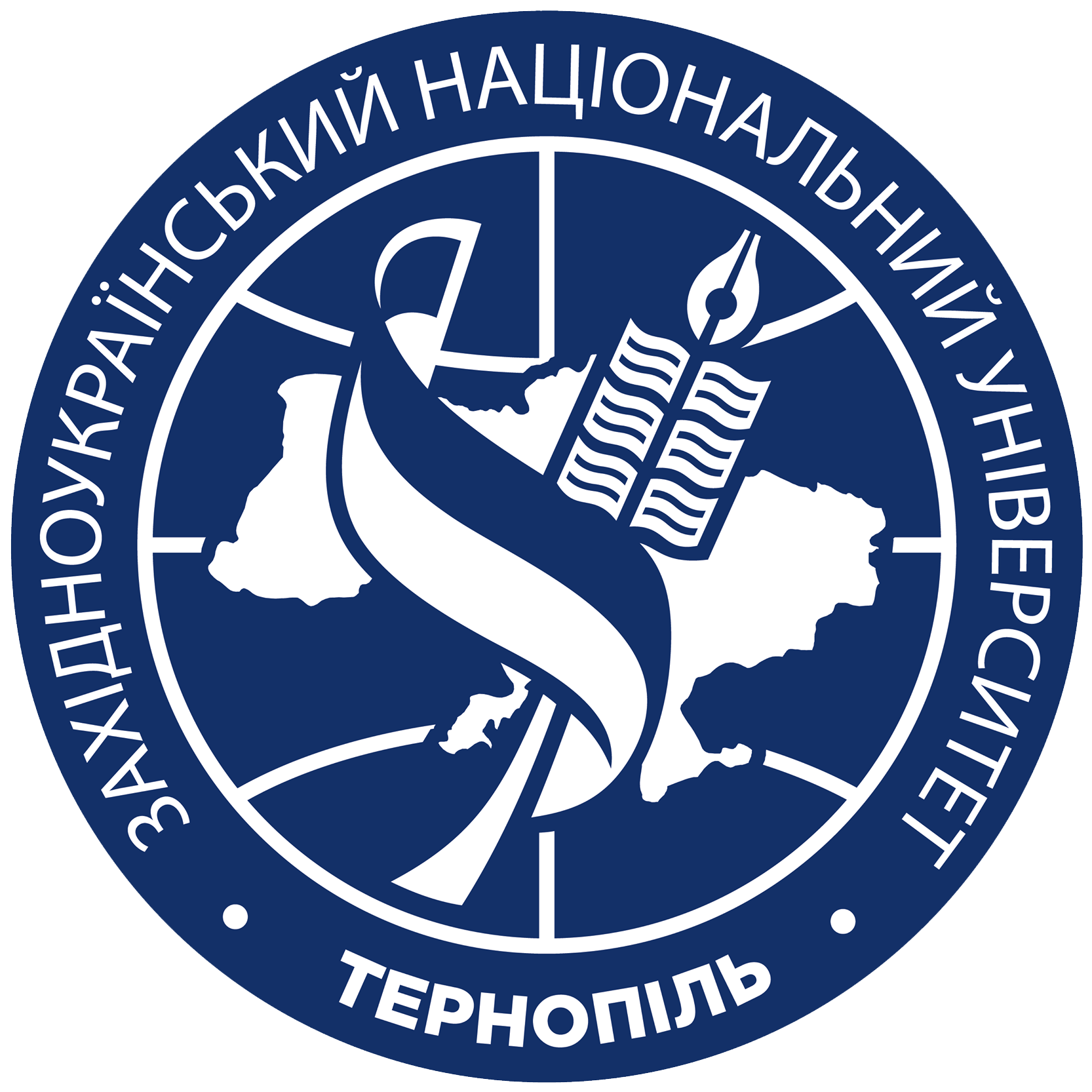
- Former names: Ternopil National Economic University (TNEU, 2006-2020); Ternopil Academy of National Economy (TANE, 1994-2005)
- Motto: Nos in gradu a fronte sumus!
- Established: 1966; 60 years ago
- Academic affiliations: European Universities Association
- Rector: Andrii Krysovatyi
- Students: 24,000
- Location: Ternopil, Ukraine
- Campus: Lvivska St, 11
- Affiliations: Ministry of Education and Science of Ukraine
- Website: wunu.edu.ua
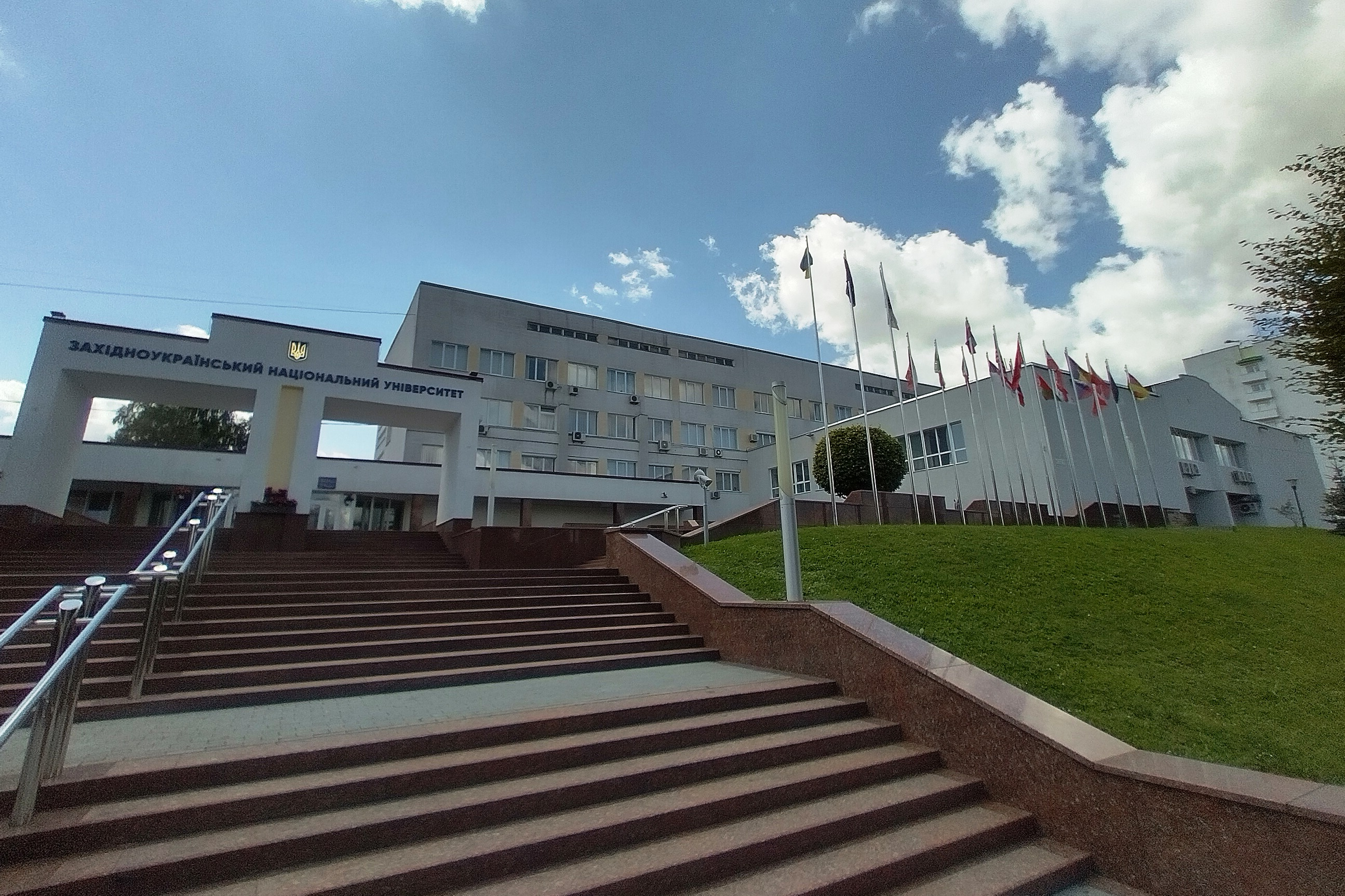

University rankings

Regional – Overall
- QS Emerging Europe and Central Asia: 301-350 (2022)

The West Ukrainian National University (abbr. WUNU, Ukrainian: Західноукраїнський національний університет, romanized: Zakhidnoukrainskyi natsionalnyi universytet) is a state-sponsored university founded in 1966 and located in the city of Ternopil, Ternopil Oblast, Ukraine. One of the city's top public universities, it is ranked #103 in Europe University Rankings - Eastern Europe 2025.

Viktor Yushchenko, the president of Ukraine (2005–2010), is an alumnus of WUNU.

== History ==
The university was founded in 1966, when the Department of Financial and Economic Faculty of Kyiv Institute of National Economy was opened in Ternopil. Within the years, the department was transformed into the faculty (1967), after that – into Financial and Economic Institute (1971), Institute of National Economy (1989), Academy of National Economy (1994). On March 30, 2005, the educational establishment became a university. On September 29, 2006, the national status was conferred to the university.

== Campuses and buildings ==
Nowadays the WUNU complex includes 14 training and laboratorial complexes, a library, 4 sport gyms, 3 sports-grounds, 8 dormitories, 9 economic and service buildings.

== Academic departments by faculty ==
- Faculty of Accounting and Audit;
- Faculty of Agricultural Economics and Management;
- Faculty of Banking Business;
- Faculty of Computer Informational Technologies;
  - Department of Information Computing Systems and Control;
  - American-Ukrainian School of Computer Sciences and Technologies;
- Faculty of Economics and Investment Management;
- Faculty of Economics and Management;
- Faculty of Finance;
- Faculty of International Business and Management;
- Faculty of Law;
- The Ukrainian-Dutch Faculty of Economics and Management;
- Faculty of Post-Graduate Studies.

== International activity ==
=== Participation in international organizations ===
- European Association of International Education (1999)
- European University Association (2007)
- Magna Charta Universitatum (2008)
- Talloires Network (from 2012)

=== Agreements with foreign partners ===
Cooperation with 52 foreign educational institutions is established (16 higher educational institutions of Poland; 7 – of Russia; 4 – of Germany; 3 – of Belarus, Italy, the USA; 2 – of Bulgaria, Kazakhstan, China; 1 – of Austria, Greece, Denmark, Canada, Lithuania, Moldova, the Netherlands, Spain, Romania, France).

=== Joint programs of cooperation with foreign partners ===
- German-speaking integrated program in Bachelor and Master training
- Ukrainian-American program in Bachelor training
- English-speaking program in International Economics and Tourism
- Ukrainian-Greek program in Master training in «Business administration»
- Program in training Bachelors and Masters on specialization «Crisis analysis and decision making»
- Ukrainian-Polish program in finances and insurance
- School of Polish and European Law
- Ukrainian-Dutch Faculty of Economics and Management
- Ukrainian-German Economic Faculty

=== Training of foreign students, post-graduates and doctoral students ===
Since 2007, 203 foreigners obtained certificates on graduation from the TNEU Preparatory Department for Foreigners; since 2006 foreign citizens were granted 62 Master Diplomas and 40 Bachelor Diplomas.

=== International programs and grants ===
Within the period of the last decade, TNEU participated in 35 international projects TEMPUS-TACIS, DAAD, APPOLO, «Marie Curie» etc.

== See also ==
List of universities in Ukraine
