= Kharkiv College of Textile and Design =

University in Kharkiv, Ukraine

'Kharkiv Professional College of Technologies and Design
- Харківський фаховий коледж технологій та дизайну
- Motto: Scientia, usus, updates, societas, community
- Established: 1935
- Affiliations: Ministry of Education and Science of Ukraine
- Rector: Olena Yemelianova
- Students: 914
- Location: Kharkiv, Ukraine
- Website: khpctd.ukr.education

The Kharkiv Professional College of Technologies and Design is a Ukrainian state higher educational establishment in Kharkiv.

Post address: Harkova, st. Danilevsky, 3

== Campuses and buildings ==
Studying is organized in the buildings number 1 and 2 of the college. The total area of the buildings is 16181square meters, namely:

- studying (classrooms, laboratories, workshops,6 computer classrooms with 100 modern computers and high-speed access

to the Internet (923 square meters area);

- a hostel with 537 places of 6943 square meters area;
- 2 libraries with two reading halls of 161 square meters area;
- a typical sport hall of 260 square meters area;
- a sports ground, training rooms in the hostel;
- a canteen and a bar with 60 places of the 130 square meters area;
- an assembly hall of the 144 square meters area;

Ukrainian cultural center and the museum of the college.

== Institutes and faculties ==
For the organization of technical, educational work and practical training there are10 commissions:

- social sciences;
- humanities;
- Physical and Mathematical Sciences;
- general engineering and mechanical disciplines;
- design and construction of consumer goods and hairdressing art;
- sewing manufacture;
- manufacture and design of yarns, fabrics and knitted goods;
- chemical technology, finishing production and applied ecology;
- economics;
- physical education and military training.

== Famous alumni ==
- Designer Andre Tan, well known in the world. His name was recorded into the book of Guinness Records of Ukraine;
- Bondarenko A.M. – honorary council of Slovenia in Kharkiv.
