= Kharkiv tragedy =

1941 prison burning in Ukraine by Red Army

The Kharkiv tragedy was the burning of an NKVD prison by the retreating Red Army in 1941. 1,200 political prisoners were burned alive. The prison was located on Chernyshevsky Street in Kharkiv, Ukraine.

== Memorial ==
On 17 March 2012, citizens of Kharkiv honored victims of the tragedy for the first time. Participants addressed the toponymic commission of Kharkiv City Council to allow placement of memorials on the Directorate of Police memorial board.
