= 2006 Kharkiv supermarket bombings =

Kharkiv supermarket bombings
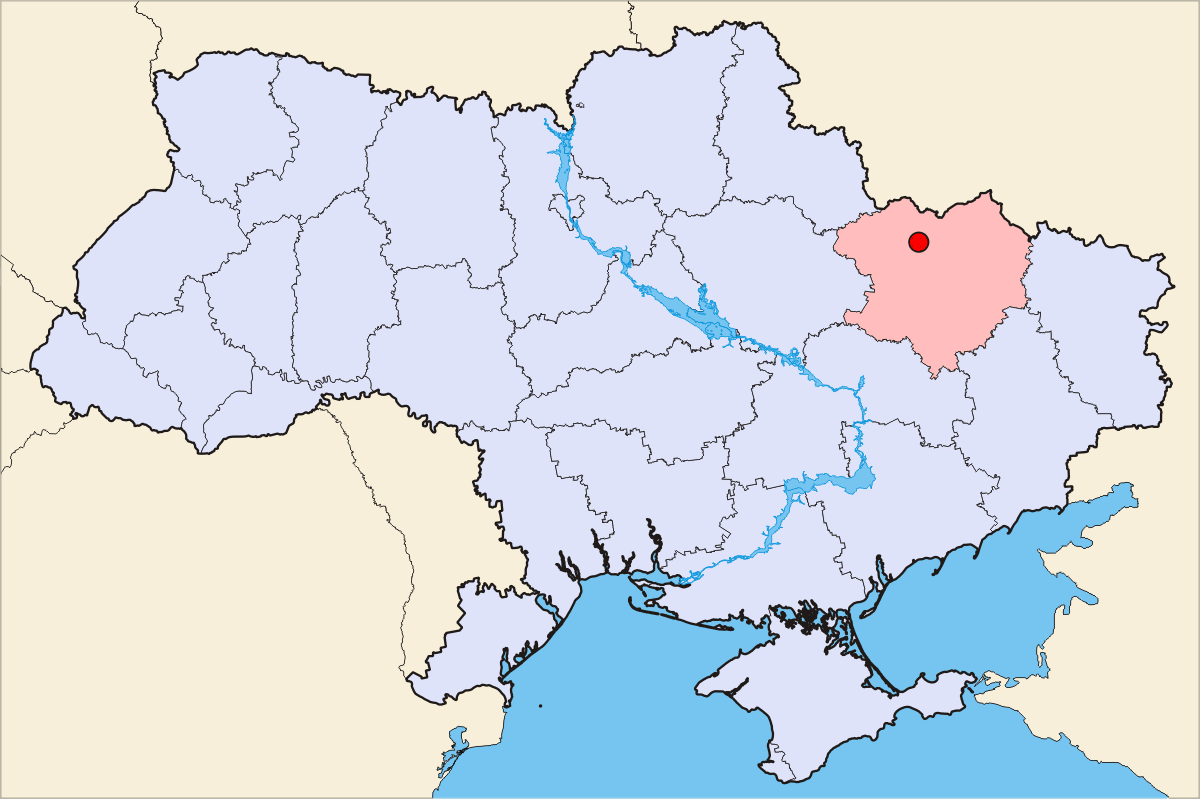
- Location on Kharkiv in Kharkiv Oblast

- Location of Kharkiv Oblast in Ukraine
- Location: Kharkiv, Kharkiv Oblast, Ukraine
- Date: 22 April 2006
- Target: 2 supermarkets
- Attack type: Bombing
- Weapon: Homemade bomb
- Deaths: 0
- Injuries: 14
- Perpetrator: Unknown
- Motive: Blackmail

The Kharkiv supermarket bombings took place around noon on 22 April 2006 in the Ukrainian city of Kharkiv. Two homemade bombs exploded in supermarkets about one kilometer apart. The first bomb blast occurred in the YuSI supermarket injuring at least two people. Eight minutes later, the second bomb blast occurred in the Silpo supermarket injuring at least six people. The bomb blasts were organized by two people. The two criminals tried to use the bombs as a form of blackmailing to get US$50,000 out of each supermarket, at least one of the people involved was arrested.
