= University of Almería =

Public university in Andalusia, Spain

Coordinates: 36.82928°N 2.40442°W

- Universidad de Almería
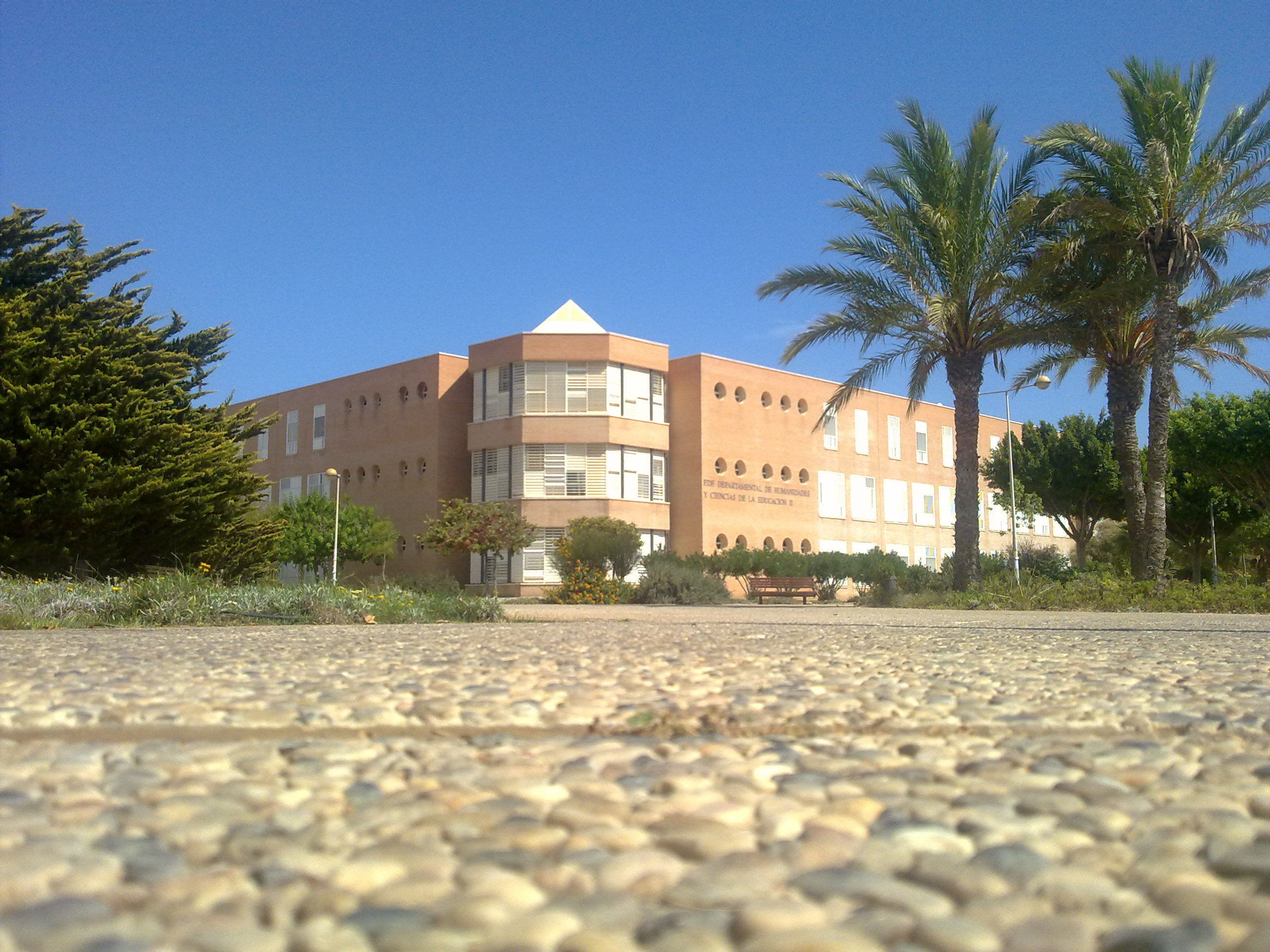
- Part of the Aulario building of the University of Almería.
- Motto: "In Lumine Sapientia. Universitas Almeriensis"
- Type: Public
- Established: 1993; 33 years ago
- Rector: José Céspedes
- Administrative staff: 871
- Students: 11,825
- Location: Carretera Sacramento s/n La Cañada de San Urbano, Almería, España, Almería, Andalusia, Spain
- Website: www.ual.es
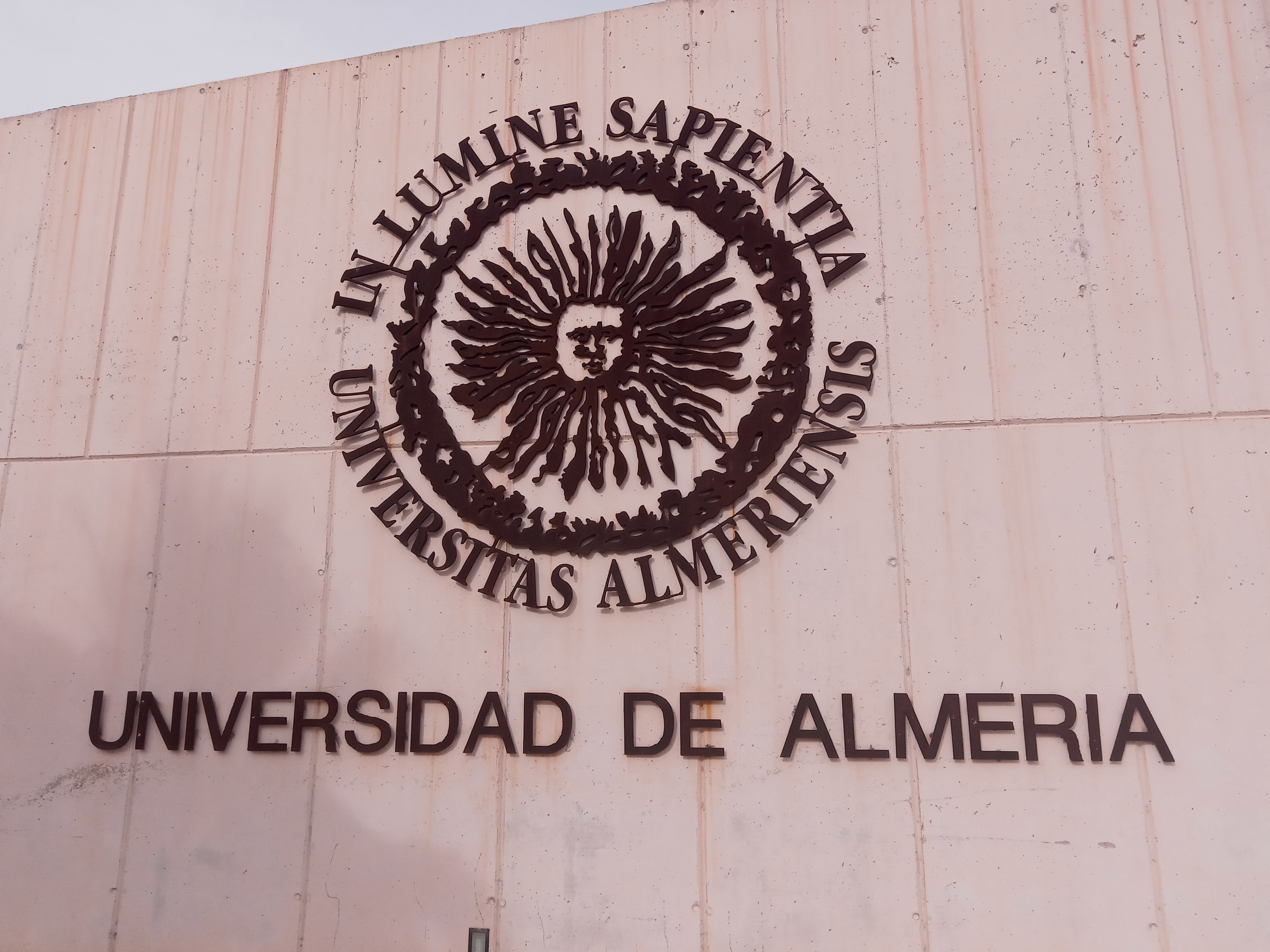

The University of Almería (Spanish: Universidad de Almería, UAL) is a public university situated in Almería, Spain. Located on the shore of the Mediterranean Sea, it belongs to the La Cañada de San Urbano district of Almería City. In 2008 the university offered 38 different degree programmes, with 871 lecturers, and 11,825 students.

At the time of its foundation, its initial governing was assigned to D. Alberto Fernández Gutiérrez, as Vice-Chancellor. In 2007 Pedro Molina García was elected rector. He was succeeded by Carmelo Rodríguez Torreblanca, who obtained the 68.24% of the votes, elected by the university community in the elections that took place in early 2015, taking over from D. Alfredo Martinez Almécija. He was reelected on 28 May 2019 with 87% of votes. Carmelo was succeeded by José Céspedes with the 55.6% of the votes (2,285) against Diego Valera, who obtained 1,690.

Forbes listed the university as one of the best universities in Spain.

== Access ==
The University of Almería is connected by roads and bus services to the city and the province.

=== By road ===
It is possible to come via the coast, using the AL-3202 road. This road is mainly used by those coming from the south of the capital. There is also an access road to the north from the AL-3200. This connects with the AL-12 motorway, which provides quick access from the north of the capital and the rest of the metropolitan area. A number of students prefer to cross the Andarax River to avoid congestion. The AL-3200 is also used from the East, but this is rare given the low population density in that area. From early on parking spaces are scarce, so visitors often park several hundred yards away.

=== By Public Transport ===
Bus routes 11, 12, 18 and 19 of the local bus service come to UAL, and connect it with the capital via the bus station, providing access to all students in the province. The service is busy during peak hours, so for this reason it is common to see additional buses on routes 13 and 14, exclusively for student use. The introduction of a tram is being considered, though government agencies do not deem it worthwhile.

== Colleges and Faculties ==
=== Colleges ===
- Polytechnics
- Labour Relations

=== Faculties ===
- Health Sciences
- Economics and Business Studies
- Natural Sciences
- Education
- Law
- Humanities
- Psychology

== Polyphonic Choir ==
The Polyphonic Choir of the University of Almería is a mixed polyphonic chamber choir, mainly composed of university students, created in the University of Almería (Almería, Andalusia, Spain). The University Choir was founded as a polyphonic choir in 1994. Its director since then has been José Luis Martínez who was previously director of Almeria's Vírgen del Mar Choir. Its main objective is the study, interpretation, and diffusion of polyphonic choral music of all eras and styles. It performs at all official functions of the university, as well as at various choral meetings, and participates in the music outreach programmes of Almería City Council, Almería Province Council, and the Ministry of Culture of Andalusia. It has performed more than 150 recitals throughout Spain, and its repertoire is close to 200 works. It has recorded several television shows, and a CD.
