= European Universities Championships =

University sports competitions

European Universities Championships (EUC) are university sports competitions governed by the European University Sports Association (EUSA) since 2001. There are currently 23 sports in which the championships are organised. Participants in these events are European university teams and individuals.

In 2019 new Championships were created for kickboxing, orienteering, beach handball and water polo.

== History ==
The championships have been organised annually since 2001, and from 2012 onwards, they will be organised on a biannual basis, with European Universities Games being organised in even years as a multi-sport events, and the individual championships being organised in odd years. Under the umbrella of EUSA, the first championships were organised in 2001 under the name of European University Championships. In 2006, the sports events were renamed European Universities Championships, to stress the universities being the participants in the events. In 2012 the first European Universities Games was organised, bringing together 10 sports from the European Universities Championships at the same place at the same time. In 2014 the second European Universities Games was organised in Rotterdam including 10 different sports.

== Championships overview ==
Year	Sport Events	Debut Sports	Notes
2001	2	Volleyball, Basketball	
2002	2		
2003	4	Karate, Football	
2004	7	Tennis, Futsal, Beach volleyball, Badminton	
2005	9	Rowing	
2006	9	Handball	
2007	12	Rugby 7s, Table tennis	
2008	11		
2009	15	Taekwondo, Bridge, Golf	
2010	11		
2011	16	Judo	
2012 European Universities Games			
2013	17	Basketball 3x3	
2014 European Universities Games			
2015	20	Dance, Chess,	
2016 European Universities Games			
2017	19		
2018 European Universities Games			
2019	21	Kickboxing, Beach handball, Orienteering, Water polo	
2020 European Universities Games			Postponed to 2021, then cancelled
2022 European Universities Games			
2022	1		Rowing championship held in 2022 because the European University Games in Lodz could not host it.
2023	16	Alpine skiing, Snowboarding	
2024 European Universities Games			
2024	1		
2025	17	Padel, Snow volleyball	
2026 European Universities Games			Future event
2026	2		Future event
2027	20	Athletics, Powerlifting	Future event
2028 European Universities Games			Future event
2030 European Universities Games			Future event

== Championships Summary ==
The programme of the European Universities Championships is subject to change and currently includes 23 sports.

- Individual / team sports
- Indoor / outdoor sports
- Combat sports
- Mind sports
- Racquet sports

Number	Event	First Edition
Main Sports
1	European Universities Rowing Championship	2005
Combat Sports
2	European Universities Judo Championships	2011
3	European Universities Karate Championships	2003
4	European Universities Kickboxing Championships	2019
5	European Universities Taekwondo Championships	2009
Team Sports
6	European Universities 3x3 Basketball Championships	2013
7	European Universities Basketball Championships	2001
8	European Universities Beach Handball Championships	2019
9	European Universities Beach Volleyball Championships	2004
10	European Universities Football Championships	2003
11	European Universities Futsal Championships	2004
12	European Universities Handball Championships	2006
13	European Universities Rugby 7s Championships	2007
14	European Universities Volleyball Championships	2001
15	European Universities Water Polo Championships	2019
Racquet Sports
16	European Universities Badminton Championships	2004
17	European Universities Table Tennis Championships	2007
18	European Universities Tennis Championships	2004
Mind Sports
19	European Universities Bridge Championships	2009
20	European Universities Chess Championships	2015
Other Sports
21	European Universities Golf Championships	2009
22	European Universities Orienteering Championships	2019
23	European Universities Sport Climbing Championships	2015

== 2022 ==
Rowing Istanbul, TUR September 6–9

== 2023 ==
1. Football Tirana, Albania June 25- July 2
2. Tennis Granada, Spain July 3–9
3. Table tennis Olomouc, Czech Republic July 4–9
4. Handball Podgorica, Montenegro July 8–14
5. Badminton Miskolc, Hungary July 13–19
6. Water polo Miskolc, Hungary July 13–19
7. 3x3 Basketball Debrecen, Hungary July 15–19
8. Volleyball Braga, Portugal July 16–23
9. Futsal Split, Croatia July 18–26
10. Combat Sports:Judo, Karate, Kickboxing, Taekwondo Zagreb, Croatia July 20–23
11. Basketball Aveiro, Portugal July 23–30
12. Orienteering St.Gallen, Switzerland August 24–27
13. Rugby 7s Lisbon, Portugal August 28–31
14. Rowing Bydgoszcz, Poland September 7–10
15. Beach sports:Beach Handball, Beach Volleyball Malaga, Spain September 20–23 September 19–24
16. Winter Sports:Alpine Skiing, Snowboarding Val di Zoldo, Italy December 18–21

== 2024 ==
Rowing Zagreb, CRO August 28–31

== See also ==
- European Universities Games
- FISU World University Championships
- FISU World University Games
- International Erasmus Games
- World University Championships
- European University Hockey League
- International University Sports Federation since 1949
- European University Sports Association since 1999
- Africa University Sports (FASU) since 1971
- Asian University Sports Federation (AUSF) since 1992
- FISU America since 2007
- FISU Oceania since 2008
- University and college sport
