= European Universities Table Tennis Championships =

European Universities Table Tennis Championships were the first organised in 2007 and have been organised annually since.

The European Universities Table Tennis Championships are coordinated by the European University Sports Association along with the 18 other sports on the program of the European universities championships. Since 2012, in even-numbered years, the championships have been integrated into the European Universities Games.

== Summary ==
Edition	Year	Location	Nb of countries	Nb of universities	Nb of participants
1st EUC	2007	Czech Republic; Ostrava	12	25	111
2nd EUC	2008	Italy; Latina	10	20	110
3rd EUC	2009	Serbia; Niš	9	21	90
4th EUC	2010	Russia; Kazan	8	16	85
5th EUC	2011	Portugal; Madeira	14	66	115
1st EUG	2012	Spain; Cordoba	13	32	138
6th EUC	2013	Turkey; Zonguldak	15	54	383
2nd EUG	2014	Netherlands; Rotterdam	15	36	153
7th EUC	2015	Switzerland; Geneva	14	24	129
3rd EUG	2016	Croatia; Zagreb, Rijeka	18	33	190
8th EUC	2017	Czech Republic; Olomouc	13	28	131
4th EUG	2018	Portugal; Coimbra	14	24	123
9th EUC	2019	Italy; Camerino	14	27	142
5th EUG	2020	~~Serbia~~; ~~Belgrad~~	Cancelled		
6th EUG	2022	Poland; Lodz	16	31	154
10th EUC	2023	Czech Republic; Olomouc	13	24	133
7th EUG	2024	Hungary; Debrecen-Miskolc	20	28	165
11th EUC	2025	Turkey; Burdur	12	26	148
8th EUG	2026	Italy; Salerno	*	*	*

== Results ==
Year	Event	Gold	Silver	Bronze	Bronze
2007	Men's Singles	Kirill Skachkov, Orenburg State University; Russia	Wehking Lennart, University of Cologne; Germany	Przybylik Milosz, Academy of Jan Dlugosz Czestochova; Poland	Gladyshev Mikhail, Orenburg State University; Russia
2007	Men's Doubles	Petrukhin Evgeny, Lakeev Vasily; Russian State University of Physical Education, Sport and Tourism; Russia	Gladyshev Mikhail, Skachkov Kirill; Orenburg State University; Russia	Wehking Lennart, Eberhardt Jakob; University of Cologne; Germany	Van Boven Dennis, Van den Oord Tim; University of Eindhoven; Netherlands
2007	Women's Singles	Mikhailova Tatiana, Moscow Aviation Institute; Russia	Hadacova Dana, Technical University of Ostrava; Czech Republic	Tikhomirova Anna, Moscow Aviation Institute; Russia	Shubina Alena, Moscow Aviation Institute; Russia
2007	Women's Doubles	Mikijaniec Alina, Luczakowska Daria; University School of Physical Education; Poland	Prokhorova Yulia, Fetyukhina Margarita; Russian State University of Physical Education, Sport and Tourism; Poland	Pastor Agata, Myga Olga; Academy of Jan Dlugosz Czestochova; Poland	Kardauskaite Inga, Jucevičiute Ieva, Vilnius College of Higher Education; Lithuania
2007	Mixed Doubles	Mikijaniec Alina, Luczakowska Daria; University School of Physical Education; Poland	Prokhorova Yulia, Fetyukhina Margarita; Russian State University of Physical Education, Sport and Tourism; Russia	Pastor Agata, Myga Olga; Academy of Jan Dlugosz Czestochova; Poland	Kardauskaite Inga, Jucevičiute Ieva, Vilnius College of Higher Education; Lithuania
2007	Team Men	Russian State University of Physical Education, Sport and Tourism; Russia	Orenburg State University; Russia	University of Cologne; Germany	University of Ostrava; Czech Republic
2007	Team Women	Russian State University of Physical Education, Sport and Tourism; Russia	Moscow Aviation Institute; Russia	University School of Physical Education Wroclaw; Poland	Technical University of Ostrava; Czech Republic
2008	Men's Singles	Jiang Changhhong / London Metropolitan University; United Kingdom	Zang Honghang / London Metropolitan University; United Kingdom	Lakeev Vasily / Russian State University of Physical Education, Sport and Tourism; Russia	Jang Zhitao / London Metropolitan University; Russia
2008	Men's Doubles	Jiang Z.-Ashley V./ London Metropolitan University; United Kingdom	Jiang C.-Zhang H. /London Metropolitan University; United Kingdom	Eberhardt J.-Wehking L. /Cologne University; Germany	Komov A. - Barchatov E. / St. Petersbourg; Russia
2008	Women's Doubles	Prokhorova J.-Fetyukhina M. / Russian State University of Physical Education, Sport and Tourism; Russia	Luczakowska D.-Golota M. / University School of Physical Education in Wroclaw; Poland	Shishmareva O.-Rozhkova M. / Russian State University of Physical Education, Sport and Tourism; Russia	Lemeshevskaya V.- Naumowa E. / Russian State University of Physical Education, Sport and Tourism; Russia
2008	Women's Singles	Prokhorova Julia / Russian State University of Physical Education, Sport and Tourism; Russia	Walna Weronika / Jan Dlugosz University in Czestochowa; Poland	Golota Marta / University School of Physical Education in Wroclaw; Poland	Fetyukhina Margarita / Russian State University of Physical Education, Sport and Tourism; Russia
2008	Mixed Doubles	Barchatov E. - Fetyukhina M. / St. Petersbourg University; Russia	Luczakowska D. - Michalak R. / University School of Physical Education in Wroclaw; Poland	Walna W. – Zabski R. / Jan Dlugosz University in Czestochowa; Poland	Sedykh I. – Petrukhin E. / Russian State University of Physical Education, Sport and Tourism; Russia
2008	Team Men	London Metropolitan University; United Kingdom	Russian State University of Physical Education, Sport and Tourism; Russia	University of Cologne; Germany	Zielona Gora University; Poland
2008	Team Women	Jan Dlugosz University in Czestochowa; Poland	Russian State University of Physical Education, Sport and Tourism; Russia	University School of Physical Education in Wroclaw; Poland	St. Petersburg University; Russia
2009	Men's Singles	Kirill Skachkov, Orenburg State University; Russia	Viacheslav Burov, Russian State Hydrometeorogical University; Russia	Alan Wos, Rzeszow University of Technology; Poland	Gladyshev Mikhail, Orenburg State University; Russia
2009	Men's Doubles	Kirill Skachkov, Mikhail Gladyshev, Orenburg State University; Russia	Alan Wos, Tomasz Lewandowski, Rzeszow University of Technology; Poland	Jiang Penfei, Menge Gencay, Marmara University; Turkey	Viacheslav Burov, Alexandr Komov, Russian StateHydrometeorogical University; Russia
2009	Women's Singles	Daria Luczakowska, University School of Physical Education, Wroclaw; Poland	Valentina Sabitova, Russian State University of Physical Education, Sport and Tourism, Moscow; Russia	Olga Vorobchikova, Russian State University of Physical Education, Sport and Tourism, Moscow; Russia	Agata Pastor, Jan Dlugosz University, Czestochowa; Poland
2009	Women's Doubles	Yang Xin, Agata Pastor, Jan Dlugosz University, Czestochowa; Poland	Margarita Fetyukhina, Valentina Sabatova, Russian State University of Physical Education, Sport and Tourism, Moscow; Russia	Olga Smismmareva, Veleriya Lemesmevskaya, Moscow State University of Railway Engineering; Russia	Olga Baranova, Alexandra Semenova, Moscow State University of Railway Engineering; Russia
2009	Mixed Doubles	Agata Pastor, Tomasz Leandowski; Poland	Irena Sedykh, Kirill Skachkov; Russia	Alan Wos, Yang Xin; Poland	Valentina Sabitova, Evgeny Barkhatov; Lithuania
2009	Team Men	Orenburg State University; Russia	Rzeszow University of Technology; Poland	Stuttgart University; Germany	Marmara University; Turkey
2009	Team Women	Jan Dlugosz University, Czestochowa; Poland	Russian State University of Physical Education, Sport and Tourism, Moscow; Russia	Moscow State University of Railway Engineering; Russia	University of Karlsruhe; Germany
2010	Men's Singles	Gladyshev Mikhail Orenburg State University; Russia	Merzlikin Taras Russian State University of Humanities; Russia	Mutygullin Ramil Kazan Volga Federal University; Russia	Zhidkov Ilya Kazan Volga Federal University; Russia
2010	Men's Doubles	Merzlikin T. – Martykov S. Russian State University of Humanities; Russia	Lezhnev I. – Utochkin A. Orenburg State University; Russia	Lewandowski T. – Chmiel P. Rzeszow University Of Technology; Poland	Bolshov A. – Zhidkov I. Kazan Volga Federal University; Russia
2010	Women's Singles	Voronova Anastasia Kazan Volga Federal University; Russia	Saveleva Antonina Kazan Volga Federal University; Russia	Milkhailova Tatiana Russian State University of Humanities; Russia	Baranova Olga Moscow State University of Railway Engineering; Russia
2010	Women's Doubles	Saveleva A. – Voronova A. Kazan Volga Federal University; Russia	Baranova O. – Semenova A. Moscow State University of Railway Engineering; Russia	Valasova O. – Sharipova E. Kazan Volga Federal University; Russia	Pastor A. – Dytko R. Jan Dlugosz University of Czestochowa; Poland
2010	Mixed Doubles	Chmiel P. Rzeszow University of technology (POL) / Voronova A Kazan Volga Federal University; Russia	Utochkin A. Orenburg State University (RUS) /Semenova A. Moscow State University of Railway Engineering; Russia	Mutygullin R. – Saveleva A. Kazan Volga Federal University; Russia	Merzlikin T. – Mikhailova T. Russian State University of Humanities; Russia
2010	Team Men	Orenburg State University; Russia	OKazan Volga Federal University; Russia	Rzeszow University Of Technology; Poland	*
2010	Team Women	Russian State University of Humanities; Russia	Jan Dlugosz University of Czestochowa; Poland	Moscow State University of Railway Engineering; Russia	*
2011	Men's Singles	Alexander Shibaev, Kazan Federal University; Russia	Vlasov Grigory, Kazan Federal University; Russia	Chmiel Pawel, rzeszow University of Technology; Poland	Malicki Szymon, Jozef Rusiecki Olsztyn University College; Poland
2011	Men's Doubles	Patryk Chojnowski / Szymon Malicki, Jozef Rusiecki Olsztyn University College; Poland	Karol Szarmach / Bartosz Szarmach, Jozef Rusiecki Olsztyn University College; Poland	Pawel Chmiel / Piotr Chmiel, Rzeszow University of Technology; Poland	Mikhail Gladyshev / Taras Merzlikin, Russian State University for the Humanities; Russia
2011	Women's Singles	Magdalena Sikorska, University of Warsaw; Poland	Emmanuelle Lennon, Université de Bretagne Occidentale; France	Polina Mikhaylova, Kazan Federal University; Russia	Sarah Hanffou, Aix Marseille Université; France
2011	Women's Doubles	Olga Vlasova / Elza Sharipova, Kazan Federal University; Russia	Anna Janta-Lipinska / Anna Zak, Wroclaw University of Economic; Poland	Svetlana Martynova / Natella Kazumova, Moscow State University of Railway Engineering; Russia	Natalia Bak / Magdalena Sikorska, University of Warsaw; Poland
2011	Mixed Doubles	Pawel Chmiel / Anna Janta-Lipinska, Wroclaw University of Economic; Poland	Mkhail Gladyshev / Alexandra Semenova, Russian State University for the Humanities; Russia	Viatcheslav Krivosheev / Polina Mikhaylova, Kazan Federal University; Russia	Grigory Vlasov / Olga Vlasova, Kazan Federal University; Russia
2011	Team Men	University of Jozef Rusiecki; Poland	University of Russian State for the Humanities; Russia	University of Ljubljana; Slovenia	University of Rzeszow; Poland
2011	Team Women	Kazan Federal University; Russia	University of Warsaw; Poland	University of Moscow Railway Engineering; Russia	University of Wroclaw; Poland
2012	Men's Singles	Lennart Wehking, University of Cologne; Germany	*	*	*
2012	Men's Doubles	Taras Merzlikin / Andrey Baybuldin, Russian State University for the Humanities; Russia	*/*	*/*	*/*
2012	Women's Singles	Ekaterina Rylskaya, Russian State University for the Humanities; Russia	*	*	*
2012	Women's Doubles	Nastiya Voronova / Victoria Lebedeva, Kazan Federal University; Russia	*/*	*/*	*/*
2012	Team Men	Rzeszow University of Technology; Poland	University of Russian State for the Humanities; Russia	University of Ljubljana; Slovenia	Jozef Rusiecki Osztyn University of College; Poland
2012	Team Women	University of Russian State for the Humanities; Russia	Kazan State Federal University; Russia	WG Mainz; Germany	University of Warsaw; Poland
2013	Men's Singles	Tomasz Levandowski, Rzeszow University of Technology; Poland	Chris Doran, Nottingham Trent University; United Kingdom	Pavel Chmiel, Rzeszow University of Technology; Poland	Andrey Baibulden, Russian State University for the Humanities; Russia
2013	Men's Doubles	Taras Merzlikin / Andrey Baybuldin, Russian State University for the Humanities; Russia	Egor Timin / Oleg Zharko, Orenburg State University; Russia	Chris Doran / Hussain Emran, Nottingham Trent University; United Kingdom	Tomasz Levandowski / Michal Dobrovski, Rzeszow University of Technology; Poland
2013	Women's Singles	Antonina Savelyeva, Kazan Federal University; Russia	Olga Vlasova, Kazan Federal University; Russia	Agata Pastor, Jan Dlugosz University of Czestochowa; Poland	Elza Sharipova, Kazan Federal University; Russia
2013	Women's Doubles	Antonina Savelyeva / Victoria Lebedeva, Kazan Federal University; Russia	Elza Sharipova / Olga Vlasova, Kazan Federal University; Russia	Ren Bingran / Dominika Dobrovska, University of Warsaw; Poland	Elise Paquverean / Cecile Sanchez, Université Poitiers; France
2013	Team Men	Rzeszow University of Technology; Poland	University of Russian State for the Humanities; Russia	Orenburg State University; Russia	University of Koblenz-Landau; Germany
2013	Team Women	Kazan State Federal University; Russia	University of Warsaw; Poland	Nottingham Trent University; United Kingdom	Jan Dlugosz University of Czestochowa; Poland
2014	Men's Singles	Piotr Chmiel, Rzeszow University of Technology; Poland	Ilia Shamin, Russian State University for the Humanities; Russia	Taras Merzlikin, Russian State University for the Humanities; Russia	Mateusz Czernik, Rzeszow University of Technology; Poland
2014	Men's Doubles	Christopher Doran / Sean Cullen, Nottingham Trent University; United Kingdom	Minh Tran Le / Vu Tran Le, Utrecht University; Russia	Michal Dabrowski / Mateusz Czernik, Rzeszow University of Technology; Poland	Andrei Baibuldin / Taras Marzlikin, Russian State University for the Humanities; Russia
2014	Women's Singles	Yvonne Kaiser, University of Warsaw; Poland	Magdalena Sikorska, Institute of Economics Management and Law Kazan; Russia	Antonina Savelyeva, Russian State University for the Humanitites; Russia	Mateja Maglicic, University of Zagreb; Croatia
2014	Women's Doubles	Bingran Ren / Dominika Dabrowska, University of Warsaw; Poland	Antonina Savelyeva / Victoria Lebedeva, Institute of Economics Management and Law Kazan; Russia	Anna Kozlovskaia / Anasatasia Golubeva, Russian State University for the Humanities; Russia	Magdalena Sikorska / Alicja Lesniak, Kozminski University; France
2014	Team Men	Russian State University for the Humanities; Russia	University of Zagreb; Croatia	Rzeszow University of Technology; Poland	University of Bochum; Germany
2014	Team Women	Institute of Economics Management and Law Kazan; Russia	Kozminski University; Poland	Vilnius University; Lithuania	Russian State University for the Humanities; Poland
2015	Men's Singles	Michal Benes Technical University of Ostrava (CZE)	Mateusz Gołębiowski Rzeszow University of Technology (POL)	Ondrej Bajger Technical University of Ostrava (CZE)	Ramil Mutygullin Russian State University for the Humanities (RUS)
2015	Men's Doubles	Bajger/Benes Technical University of Ostrava (CZE)	Kapron/Troka Gdansk University of Technology (POL)	Mutygullin/Merzlikin Russian State University for the Humanities (RUS)	Yiangou/Eftathiou University of Cyprus (CYP)
2015	Women's Singles	Anna Blazhko Institute of Economics Mgmt and Law Kazan (RUS)	Magdalena Sikorska Kozminski University (POL)	Elizaveta Khlyzova Russian State University for the Humanities (RUS)	Ekaterina Guseva Institute of Economics Mgmt and Law Kazan (RUS)
2015	Women's Doubles				
2015	Team Men	Rzeszow University of Technology (POL)	Russian State University for the Humanities (RUS)	University of Poitiers; France	University of Cyprus (CYP)
2015	Team Women	Institute of Economics Management and Law Kazan (RUS)	Russian State University for the Humanities (RUS)	University of Warsaw (POL)	Kozminski University (POL)
2016	Men's Singles	Gencay Menge (Marmara university); Turkey	Alfredas Udra (Klaipeda university); Lithuania	Tomas Mikutis (Klaipeda university); Lithuania	Boguslaw Koszyk (the angelus silesius state school of Higher vocational Education in walbrzych); Poland
2016	Men's Doubles	shamin ilia, pulnyy pavel (russian state university for the Humanities); Russia			
2016	Women's Singles	Magdalena Sikorska (Kozminski university); Poland	Olga Kulikova (russian state university for the Humanities); Russia		
2016	Women's Doubles	sikorska Magdalena, Bak natalia (Kozminski university); Poland			
2016	Team Men	russian state university for the humanities Russia	the Angelus silesius state school of higher Vocational education in walbrzych Poland	technical university of ostrava Czech Republic	Kozminski university Poland
2016	Team Women	russian state university for the humanities Russia	Kazan innovative university named After V.g. timiryasov Russia	university of Zagreb; Croatia	Kozminski university Poland
2017	Men's Singles	Floras Robert - The Angelus Silesius State School of Higher Vocational Education in Walbrzych (POL)	Chodorski Piotr - The Angelus Silesius State School of Higher Vocational Education in Walbrzych (POL)	Menge Gencay - Marmara University (TUR)	Reed Daniel - University of Nottingham (GBR)
2017	Men's Doubles	Fertikowski & Floras The Angelus Silesius State School of Higher Vocational Education in Walbrzych (POL)	Zhidkov & Gerassimenko - Magnitogorsk State Technical University (RUS)	Boguslaw & Chodorksi - The Angelus Silesius State School of Higher Vocational Education in Walbrzych (POL)	Menge & Guler - Marmara University (TUR)
2017	Women's Singles	Blazhko Anna - Kazan Innovative University named after V.G. Timiryasov (RUS)	Guseva Ekaterina - Kazan Innovative University named after V.G. Timiryasov (RUS)	Mokhnacheva Svetlana - Kazan Innovative University named after V.G. Timiryasov (RUS)	Nowacka Paulina University School of Physical Education in Wroclaw (POL)
2017	Women's Doubles	Wabik & Nowacka - University School of Physical Education in Wroclaw (POL)	Tsaptsinos & Liu - University of Nottingham (GBR)	Blazhko & Guseva - Kazan Innovative University named after V.G. Timiryasov (RUS)	Bak & Lalak - Kozminski University (POL)
2017	Team Men	The Angelus Silesius State School of Higher Vocational Education in Walbrzych (POL)	Technical University of Ostrava (CZE)	Kozminski University (POL)	Magnitogorsk State Technical University (RUS)
2017	Team Women	Kazan Innovative University named after V.G. Timiryasov (RUS)	Jan Dlugosz University in Czestochowa (POL)	University of Nottingham (GBR)	University of Paris 13 (FRA)
2018	Men's Singles	Ibrahim Gunduz, Nişantaşı University	Abdullah Talha Yigenler, Nişantaşı University	Ondřej Bajger, Technical University of Ostrava	Mateusz Gołębiowski, Rzeszow University of Technology
2018	Men's Doubles	Technical University of Ostrava	Rzeszow University of Technology	Marmara University	Marmara University
2018	Women's Singles	Anna Blazhko, Kazan Innovative University	Qiwen Xiao, University of Paris 13	Katarzyna Slifirczyk, University of Warsaw	Roksana Załomska, Jan Długosz University
2018	Women's Doubles	Jan Długosz University	Kazan Innovative University	University of Warsaw	University of Paris 13
2018	Team Men	Nişantaşı University	Rzeszow University of Technology	University of Gothenburg	Vytautas Magnus University
2018	Team Women	Kazan Innovative University	University of Warsaw	Jan Długosz University in Częstochowa	University of Paris 13
2019	Men's Singles	Ibrahim Gunduz, Nisantasi University; Turkey			
2019	Men's Doubles	Chodorski & Zavadskyi, The State School of Higher Education in Zamosc (POL)			
2019	Women's Singles	Ekaterina Okhotnikova, Kazan Innovative University named after V.G. Timiryasov; Russia			
2019	Women's Doubles	Cherniavskaia & Guseva, Magnitogorsk State Technical University; Russia			
2019	Team Men	Nisantasi University; Turkey	Magnitogorsk State Technical University; Russia	The State School of Higher Education in Zamosc; Poland	Rzeszow University of Technology; Poland
2019	Team Women	Kazan Innovative University named after V.G. Timiryasov; Russia	University of Nottingham; United Kingdom	Magnitogorsk State Technical University; Russia	University of Zagreb; Croatia
2022	Men's Singles	Jakub Folwarski — Zamojski Academy (Pologne)	Ibrahim Gündüz, Nişantaşı University	Adam Dosz	Mateusz Ufnal
2022	Men's Doubles	Abdullah Talha Yigenler / Ibrahim Gündüz; Turkey	David Molnar / Sebestyen Kovacs — University of Pécs	Gianluca Walther / Julian Roettgen	Mateusz Ufnal / Michał Majchrzak
2022	Women's Singles	Ece Haraç, Nişantaşı University'; Turkey	Anna Węgrzyn	Katarina Stražar	Katarzyna Węgrzyn
2022	Women's Doubles	Simay Kulakçeken / Ece Haraç, Nişantaşı University; Turkey	Zdena Blaskova / Gabriela Stepánová — University of Ostrava	Anna Węgrzyn / Katarzyna Węgrzyn; Poland	
2022	Team Men	Zamojski Academy; Poland	Nişantaşı University; Turkey	University of Pécs; Hungary	Technical University of Ostrava; Czech Republic
2022	Team Women	University of Ostrava; Czech Republic	Paris Dauphine University; France	University of Ljubljana; Slovenia	Wrocław University of Economics; Poland
2023	Men's Singles	Jan Zandecki, Zamojski Academy Poland			
2023	Men's Doubles	Jan Zandecki and Konrad Kulpa, Zamojski Academy Poland			
2023	Women's Singles	Jiaqi Meng, University of Nottingham United Kingdom			
2023	Women's Doubles	Jiaqi Meng and Denise Payet, University of Nottingham United Kingdom			
2023	Team Men	Zamojski Academy Poland			
2023	Team Women	University of Nottingham United Kingdom			
2024	Men's Singles	Jakub Folwarski	Ziver Gunduz	Artur Grela	Konrad Kulpa
2024	Men's Doubles	Ahmadian/Gunduz	Grela/Wederlich	Guery/Leparoux IFEPSA; France	Brugger, Neumaier
2024	Women's Singles	Ines Matos	Airi Avameri	Ilona Sztwiertnia	Katarina Strazar
2024	Women's Doubles	Hristova/Yovkova	Paulin/Strazar	Jankauskiene/Venckute	Pavlovic/Vukelic
2024	Team Men	Nisantasi University	Swiss Federal Institutet of Technology Lausanne	University of Vienna	Zamojski Academy
2024	Team Women	University of Zagreb	Sofia University	Lublin University of Technology	University of Ljubljana
2025	Men's Singles	Szymon Kolasa, Zamojski Academy; Poland	Rundong Liu, Pantheon-Sorbonne University; France	Jan Zandecki, Zamojski Academy; Poland	Martin Trunecek, University of Hradec Králové; Czech Republic
2025	Men's Doubles	Kovacs / Molnar, University of Pecs Hungary	Szymon Kolasa / Grela, Zamojski Academy; Poland		
2025	Women's Singles	Anna Wegrzyn, Wroclaw University of Economics and Business; Poland	Katarzyna Wegrzyn, Wroclaw University of Economics and Business; Poland	Tin-Tin Ho, University of Nottingham; United Kingdom	Jiaqi Meng, University of Nottingham; United Kingdom
2025	Women's Doubles	Tin-Tin Ho/ MENG, University of Nottingham; United Kingdom	PAULIN / STRAZAR University of Ljubljana; Slovenia	Agathe Avezou / Li, University of Paris; France	DARI / FEJOS, University of Pecs; Hungary
2025	Team Men	Zamojski Academy; Poland	University of Leipzig; Germany	Pantheon-Sorbonne University; France	Istanbul Aydın University; Turkey
2025	Team Women	Wroclaw University of Economics; Poland	University of Nottingham; United Kingdom	Paris Descartes University; France	University of Warsaw; Poland
2026	Men's Singles	Szymon Kolasa, Zamojski Academy; Poland	Jakub Stecyszyn, Zamojski Academy; Poland	David Szantosi, University of Pecs; Hungary	Dawid Michna, Zamojski Academy; Poland
2026	Men's Doubles	Szymon Kolasa / Grela, Zamojski Academy; Poland	David Szantosi / Molnar, University of Pecs; Hungary	Jakub Stecyszyn / Zandecki, Zamojski Academy; Poland	Gomes / Kong, University of Porto; Portugal
2026	Women's Singles	Dora Cosic, University of Zagreb; Croatia	Agathe Avezou, University of Paris; France	Leili Mostafavi, University of Paris; France	Marta Vukelic, University of Zagreb; Croatia
2026	Women's Doubles	Dora Cosic / Marta Vukelic, University of Zagreb; Croatia	PAULIN / STRAZAR University of Ljubljana; Slovenia	Agathe Avezou / Leili Mostafavi, University of Paris; France	GONCALVES / MATOS, University of Porto; Portugal
2026	Team Men	Zamojski Academy; Poland	University of Pecs; Hungary	University of Vienna; Austria	University of Porto; Portugal
2026	Team Women	University of Paris; France	University of Ljubljana; Slovenia	University of Zagreb; Croatia	University of Pecs; Hungary
