= European Universities Football Championships =

European Universities Football Championships were first organised in 2003, they have been organised annually since.

The European Universities Football Championships are coordinated by the European University Sports Association along with the 18 other sports on the program of the European universities championships.

== Football ==
2012, 2014, 2018, 2022, 2024 = EUG

- Held jointly with the EUG.

Overview of European Universities Football Championships
| Year | Venue | Numbers of | | | Men | | | Women | | |
| Year | Venue | Countries | Teams | Individuals | Winner | Finalist | Bronze Medalist | Winner | Finalist | Bronze Medalist |
| 2003 | Rome Italy | 10 | 14 | * | University of Würzburg Germany | Friedrich-Alexander University Erlangen-Nürnberg Germany | University of Belgrade Serbia | Friedrich-Alexander University Erlangen-Nürnberg Germany | University of Barcelona Spain | Technical University of Eindhoven Netherlands |
| 2004 | Wroclaw Poland | 10 | 11 | * | University of Besançon France | Technological Institute of Athens Greece | Charles University Prague Czech Republic | * | * | * |
| 2005 | Niš Serbia | 8 | 8 | * | University of Caen France | Technological Institute of Athens Greece | Kiev Inter-Regional Academy of Personnel Management Ukraine | * | * | * |
| 2006 | Eindhoven Netherlands | 13 | 18 | 346 | Haliç University Turkey | University of Camerino Italy | University of Niš Serbia | ETH Zürich Switzerland | Hanze University Groningen Netherlands | University of Nantes 1 France |
| 2007 | Rome Italy | 15 | 22 | 415 | University of Orléans France | Haliç University Turkey | University of Chieti Italy | University of Madrid Spain | Technical University of Munich Germany | University of Nantes France |
| 2008 | Kiev Ukraine | 13 | 21 | 406 | University of Caen France | IADP University of Kiev Ukraine | National Technical University of Oil and Gas Ukraine | University of Madrid Spain | Technical University of Munich Germany | University of Wroclaw Poland |
| 2009 | Wroclaw Poland | 14 | 20 | 385 | Ternopil Pedagogical Academy Ukraine | Ivano-Frankivsk University of Oil and Gas Ukraine | Karlsruhe University Germany | Autonomous University of Madrid Spain | University of Montpellier France | University School of Physical Education Poland |
| 2010 | Warsaw Poland | 11 | 18 | 354 | Halic University Turkey | Holy Cross University in Kielce Poland | Ternopil Pedagogical University Ukraine | University School of Physical Education in Wroclaw Poland | University of Lausanne Switzerland | University of Montpellier France |
| 2011 | Istanbul Turkey | 11 | 19 | 354 | University of Halle Germany | University of Lille France | Kuban State University Russia | University Paul Sabatier Toulouse France | University of Mainz Germany | TU Munich Germany |
| 2012 | 2012 European Universities Games Córdoba Spain | 13 | 25 | 460 | Halic University Turkey | Nizhny Novgorod State Pedagogical University Russia | University of Montpellier 1 France | University of Toulouse 3 Paul Sabatier France | Pierre Mendes University of Grenoble France | University of Valencia Spain |
| 2013 | Almeria Spain | 11 | 24 | 500 | Catholic University San Antonio of Murcia Spain | University of Almeria Spain | Catholic University San Vicente Valencia Spain | University of Montpellier 1 France | University of Málaga Spain | University Paul Sabatier Toulouse France |
| 2014 | EUG, Rotterdam Netherlands | 16 | 27 | 469 | Kuban State University Russia | University of Almeria Spain | University of Montpellier 1 France | University of Valencia Spain | Utrecht University Netherlands | Moscow State University of Mechanical Engineering Russia |
| 2015 | Osijek Croatia | 12 | 19 | 500 | University of Bochum Germany | Kuban State University Russia | University of Minho Portugal | University of Porto Portugal | Ural Federal University Russia | University of Montpellier France |
| 2016 | EUG, Zagreb & Rijeka Croatia | 13 | 28 | 506 | University of Minho Portugal | University of Bochum Germany | Kuban State University Russia | University of Montpellier France | University of Valencia Spain | University of Marburg Germany |
| 2017 | Porto Portugal | 13 | 27 | 550 | Kuban State University Russia | University of Lille France | University of Bordeaux France | University of Montpellier France | University of Valencia Spain | University Toulouse III - Paul Sabatier France |
| 2018 | Coimbra Portugal | 14 | 27 | 497 | University of Split Croatia | Smolensk Academy of Physical Education Russia | Boris Grinchenko Kiev University Ukraine | Siberian Federal University Russia | University of Montpellier France | University of Frankfurt Germany |
| 2019 | Madrid Spain | 16 | 31 | 613 | Kuban State University Russia | Ternopil Pedagogical University Ukraine | University of Almeria Spain | University of Coimbra Portugal | University of Frankfurt Germany | Kharkiv State Academy of Physical Culture Ukraine |
| 2022 | Lodz Poland | 14 | 23 | 434 | West University of Timisoara Romania | State University of Trade and Economics Ukraine | University of Split Croatia | University of Bordeaux France | Pavlo Tychyna State University Ukraine | University of Coimbra Portugal |
| 2023 | Tirana Albania | 16 | 28 | 519 | University of Würzburg Germany | Gdansk University of Technology Poland | Kyiv National University of Trade and Economics Ukraine | University of Bordeaux France | University of Valencia Spain | University of Coimbra Portugal |
| 2024 | Debrecen-Miskolc Hungary | 16 | 25 | 476 | Kyiv National University of Trade and Economics Ukraine | University of Würzburg Germany | University of Debrecen Hungary | University of Würzburg Germany | Polytechnic University of Hauts-de-France France | University of Rennes France |
| 2025 | Camerino Italy | 14 | 26 | 505 | West University of Timișoara Romania | University of Granada Spain | University of Rouen France | University of Würzburg Germany | University of Frankfurt Germany | Pavlo Tychyna State University Ukraine |

=== Football Medals ===
2012, 2014, 2018, 2022, 2024 = EUG

==== Men (2003-2025) ====
| Rank | Nation | Gold | Silver | Bronze | Total |
|---|---|---|---|---|---|
| 1 | Germany (GER) | 4 | 3 | 1 | 8 |
| 2 | France (FRA) | 4 | 2 | 4 | 10 |
| 3 | Russia (RUS) | 3 | 3 | 2 | 8 |
| 4 | Turkey (TUR) | 3 | 1 | 0 | 4 |
| 5 | Ukraine (UKR) | 2 | 4 | 5 | 11 |
| 6 | Romania (ROU) | 2 | 0 | 0 | 2 |
| 7 | Spain (ESP) | 1 | 3 | 2 | 6 |
| 8 | Croatia (CRO) | 1 | 0 | 1 | 2 |
| 8 | Portugal (POR) | 1 | 0 | 1 | 2 |
| 10 | Greece (GRE) | 0 | 2 | 0 | 2 |
| 10 | Poland (POL) | 0 | 2 | 0 | 2 |
| 12 | Italy (ITA) | 0 | 1 | 1 | 2 |
| 13 | Serbia (SRB) | 0 | 0 | 2 | 2 |
| 14 | Czech Republic (CZE) | 0 | 0 | 1 | 1 |
| 14 | Hungary (HUN) | 0 | 0 | 1 | 1 |
| Totals (15 entries) | | 21 | 21 | 21 | 63 |

==== Women (2003-2025) ====
| Rank | Nation | Gold | Silver | Bronze | Total |
|---|---|---|---|---|---|
| 1 | France (FRA) | 7 | 4 | 7 | 18 |
| 2 | Spain (ESP) | 4 | 5 | 1 | 10 |
| 3 | Germany (GER) | 3 | 5 | 3 | 11 |
| 4 | Portugal (POR) | 2 | 0 | 2 | 4 |
| 5 | Russia (RUS) | 1 | 1 | 1 | 3 |
| 6 | Switzerland (SUI) | 1 | 1 | 0 | 2 |
| 7 | Poland (POL) | 1 | 0 | 2 | 3 |
| 8 | Netherlands (NED) | 0 | 2 | 1 | 3 |
| 9 | Ukraine (UKR) | 0 | 1 | 2 | 3 |
| Totals (9 entries) | | 19 | 19 | 19 | 57 |

== Futsal ==
http://old.futsalplanet.com/agenda/agenda-01.asp?id=20744

http://old.futsalplanet.com/agenda/agenda-01.asp?id=19492

http://old.futsalplanet.com/agenda/agenda-01.asp?id=19477

European Universities Futsal Championships

=== Results ===
2012, 2014, 2018, 2022, 2024 = EUG = European Universities Games

==== Men ====
| # | Year | Host | 1st | 2nd | 3rd | 4th | Ref |
|---|---|---|---|---|---|---|---|
| 1 | 2004 | CYP | SCG | CRO | POL | NED | |
| 2 | 2005 | ITA | [[|]] | [[|]] | [[|]] | [[|]] | |
| 3 | 2006 | SRB | [[|]] | [[|]] | [[|]] | [[|]] | |
| 4 | 2007 | SLO | [[|]] | [[|]] | [[|]] | [[|]] | |
| 5 | 2008 | POL | [[|]] | [[|]] | [[|]] | [[|]] | |
| 6 | 2009 | MNE | [[|]] | [[|]] | [[|]] | [[|]] | |
| 7 | 2010 | CRO | [[|]] | [[|]] | [[|]] | [[|]] | |
| 8 | 2011 | FIN | [[|]] | [[|]] | [[|]] | [[|]] | |
| 1 EUG | 2012 | ESP | [[|]] | [[|]] | [[|]] | [[|]] | |
| 9 | 2013 | ESP | [[|]] | [[|]] | [[|]] | [[|]] | |
| 2 EUG | 2014 | NED | [[|]] | [[|]] | [[|]] | [[|]] | |
| 10 | 2015 | POL | CRO | RUS | FRA | TUR | |
| 3 EUG | 2016 | CRO | [[|]] | [[|]] | [[|]] | [[|]] | |
| 11 | 2017 | TUR | [[|]] | [[|]] | [[|]] | [[|]] | |
| 4 EUG | 2018 | POR | [[|]] | [[|]] | [[|]] | [[|]] | |
| 12 | 2019 | POR | [[|]] | [[|]] | [[|]] | [[|]] | |
| - | 2020 | | | | | | |
| - | 2021 | | | | | | |
| 5 EUG | 2022 | POL | [[|]] | [[|]] | [[|]] | [[|]] | |
| 13 | 2023 | CRO | [[|]] | [[|]] | [[|]] | [[|]] | |
| 6 EUG | 2024 | HUN | [[|]] | [[|]] | [[|]] | [[|]] | |
| 14 | 2025 | CRO | AZE | ESP | ESP | POL | |

- 2020 and 2021 : no event

==== Women ====
| # | Year | Host | 1st | 2nd | 3rd | 4th | Ref |
|---|---|---|---|---|---|---|---|
| 1 | 2010 | CRO | [[|]] | [[|]] | [[|]] | [[|]] | |
| 2 | 2011 | FIN | [[|]] | [[|]] | [[|]] | [[|]] | |
| 1 EUG | 2012 | ESP | [[|]] | [[|]] | [[|]] | [[|]] | |
| 3 | 2013 | ESP | [[|]] | [[|]] | [[|]] | [[|]] | |
| 2 EUG | 2014 | NED | [[|]] | [[|]] | [[|]] | [[|]] | |
| 4 | 2015 | POL | FRA | GER | TUR | POL | |
| 3 EUG | 2016 | CRO | [[|]] | [[|]] | [[|]] | [[|]] | |
| 5 | 2017 | TUR | [[|]] | [[|]] | [[|]] | [[|]] | |
| 4 EUG | 2018 | POR | [[|]] | [[|]] | [[|]] | [[|]] | |
| 6 | 2019 | POR | [[|]] | [[|]] | [[|]] | [[|]] | |
| - | 2020 | | | | | | |
| - | 2021 | | | | | | |
| 5 EUG | 2022 | POL | [[|]] | [[|]] | [[|]] | [[|]] | |
| 7 | 2023 | CRO | [[|]] | [[|]] | [[|]] | [[|]] | |
| 6 EUG | 2024 | HUN | [[|]] | [[|]] | [[|]] | [[|]] | |
| 8 | 2025 | CRO | UKR | ESP | ESP | FRA | |

- 2020 and 2021 : no event

=== History ===
History of European Universities Futsal Championships

Men

00-00/00/2020 Belgrade (SRB)*

00-00/00/2019 Braga (POR)

00-00/00/2018 Coimbra (POR)*

10-17/07/2017 Corum (TUR) - University of Beira Interior (POR)

17-24/07/2016 Zagreb (CRO) - University of Zagreb (CRO)*

02-09/08/2015 Poznań (POL) - VERN (CRO)

23-29/07/2014 Rotterdam (NED) - University of Paris (FRA)*

21-28/07/2013 Málaga (ESP) - University of Valladolid (ESP)

16-22/07/2012 Córdoba (ESP) - Siberian FU, Krasnoyarsk (RUS)*

17-24/07/2011 Tampere (FIN) - University of Valencia (ESP)

18-25/07/2010 Zagreb (CRO) - University of Zagreb (CRO)

18-26/07/2009 Podgorica (MNE) - University of Málaga (ESP)

14-19/07/2008 Wroclaw (POL) - University of Málaga (ESP)

23-29/07/2007 Izola (SVN) - Dniepropetrovsk SFA (UKR)

18-23/07/2006 Novi Sad (SRB) - University of Ljubljana (SVN)

17-24/07/2005 Latina (ITA) - University of Novi Sad (SCG)

19-24/09/2004 Paralimni (CYP) - University of Novi Sad (SCG)

Women
| Dates | Venue | Winners? |
|---|---|---|
| 0-00/00/2020 | Belgrade (SRB) | * |
| 00-00/00/2019 | Braga (POR) | |
| 00-00/00/2018 | Coimbra (POR) | * |
| 10-17/07/2017 | Corum (TUR) | Moscow Polytechnical Uni. (RUS) |
| 18-24/07/2016 | Zagreb (CRO) | Moscow State Uni. of ME (RUS)* |
| 02-09/08/2015 | Poznań (POL) | Rouen University (FRA) |
| 23-29/07/2014 | Rotterdam (NED) | University of Alicante (ESP)* |
| 21-28/07/2013 | Málaga (ESP) | University of AS Rouen UC SSE (FRA) |
| 16-22/07/2012 | Córdoba (ESP) | Moscow State TU Mami (RUS)* |
| 17-23/07/2011 | Tampere (FIN) | SSHPE Konin (POL) |
| 18-25/07/2010 | Zagreb (CRO) | University of Coimbra (POR) |

- European Universities Games - Futsal Tournament

==== 2023 ====
International Competitions - July 23, 2023 21:00

European Universities (EUSA) Futsal ChampionshipsSplit 2023

13th Men's Edition

7th Women's Edition
