= Chloe MacLean =

Scottish karate practitioner and sociology scholar

Chloe MacLean is a karate practitioner and sociology scholar based in Scotland. She has won the British karate championship for 9 times.

== Sporting career ==
Her sporting achievements to date include being nine times British Champion, four times European 'Wado' Champion and twice Commonwealth Champion in Karate. She has also won medals at the World Senior 'Wado' Championship, European University Karate Championships, and Under-21 World Karate Championships.

== Education ==
She has completed an Undergraduate and master's degrees and a PhD in Sociology. Whilst studying her undergraduate at the University of Edinburgh she participated in the Individual Performance Programme for seven years, and was awarded the prestigious Cameron Blue of the Year Award in 2012.

== Awards ==
- Senior Commonwealth Championship titles; Senior European Wado Championship wins; World Senior Wado Championship medal success; European University Karate Championship medal success; Under-21 World Karate Championship medal success; Eva Bailey Cup for the Female Athlete of the Year
- The European Association for Sociology of Sport gave her an award in 2017 for research that argued that "the unisex practice of karate particularly enables women karate practitioners to ‘undo’ conventional gendered embodiment"
- Research Impact and Knowledge Exchange Competition commendation

== International Record ==
Year	Competition	Position	Category	Weight	Ref
Representing Scotland
2008	Commonwealth Championships	2nd	Kumite (Cadet)	-57 kg	
2008	Commonwealth Championships	1st	Kumite (Cadet)	Team	
2009	European Championships	3rd	Junior Cadet		
2009	European Universities Championships	3rd	Kumite	-50 kg	
2009	World Championships	3rd	Junior	-53 kg	
2011	Commonwealth Championships	1st	Senior	-50 kg	
2011	Commonwealth Championships	1st	U21	-53 kg	
