= European Universities Basketball Championships =

Basketball tournament

The European Universities Basketball Championships were the first championships, along with the European Universities Volleyball Championships, to be included on the EUSA Sports Program. Organised annually since 2001, the European Universities Basketball Championships are coordinated by the European University Sports Association, along with the 18 other sports on the program of the European Universities Championships.

== Overview ==
Overview of European Universities Basketball Championships
	Location	Nb of countries	Nb of teams	Nb of participants	Men			Women		
					Winner	Finalist	Bronze Medalist	Winner	Finalist	Bronze Medalist
2001	Aveiro Portugal	6	8	*	University of Maribor Slovenia	Technical University of Lisbon Portugal	University of Oxford United Kingdom	University of Novi Sad Serbia	Lille University France	Aveiro University Portugal
2002	Koper Slovenia	12	22	*	University of Athens Greece	University of Primorska I Slovenia	University of Maribor Slovenia	University of Novi Sad Serbia	University of Ljubljana Slovenia	Zaporizhzhia Institute of State and Municipal Ukraine
2003	Novi Sad Serbia	13	19	*	University of Belgrade Serbia	University of Zagreb Croatia	University of Athens Greece	University of Novi Sad Serbia	Zaporizhzhia Institute of State and Municipal Ukraine	University of Athens Greece
2004	Mulhouse France	19	11	*	University of Ljubljana Slovenia	Frederick Institute of Technology Cyprus	Université de Haute Alsace Mulhouse France	University of Ljubljana Slovenia	State Vocational School of Higher Education Gorzów Wielkopolski Poland	University of Cologne Germany
2005	Gorzów Wielkopolski Poland	12	20	*	Bahçeşehir University Turkey	University of Niš Serbia	Technical University of Częstochowa Poland	University of Ljubljana Slovenia	State Vocational School of Higher Education Gorzów Wielkopolski Poland	National and Kapodistrian University of Athens Greece
2006	Guimaraes Portugal	13	28	389	University of Vytatutas Magnus Lithuania	University of Ljubljana Slovenia	University of Šiauliai Lithuania	State Vocational School of Higher Education Gorzów Wielkopolski Poland	University of Córdoba Spain	University of Ljubljana Slovenia
2007	Geneva Switzerland	15	24	320	Vytautas Magnus University Lithuania	Aristotle University of Thessaloniki Greece	University of Kragujevac Serbia	State Vocational School of Higher Education Gorzów Wielkopolski Poland	University of Ljubljana Slovenia	University of Amsterdam Netherlands
2008	Novi Sad Serbia	16	31	417	Vytautas Magnus University Lithuania	University of Belgrade Serbia	Frederick University Cyprus	Russian State Agricultural University Russia	Adam Mickiewicz University of Poznań Poland	University of Belgrade Serbia
2009	Heraklion Greece	16	27	371	University of Ljubljana Slovenia	Engecon Cherepovets Russia	Bahçeşehir University Turkey	Russian State Agricultural University Russia	University of Amsterdam Netherlands	Cologne University Germany
2010	Poznań Poland	15	27	386	Vytautas Magnus University Lithuania	University of Pushkin Russia	University of Bologna Italy	University of Belgrade Serbia	Istanbul University Turkey	Russian State Agricultural University Russia
2011	Córdoba Spain	12	30	406	Vytautas Magnus University Lithuania	Leningrad State University Russia	Fatih University Turkey	Russian State Agricultural University Russia	Adam Mickiewicz University in Poznań Poland	University of Mainz Germany
2012	EUG Córdoba Spain	15	28	371	Vytautas Magnus University Lithuania	University of Split Croatia	Poznań University of Technology Poland	Adam Mickiewicz University in Poznań Poland	University of Belgrade Serbia	Lithuanian Academia of Physical Education Lithuania
2013	Split Croatia	14	28	*	University of Split Croatia	University of Fatih Turkey	University of Belgrade Serbia	University of Belgrade Serbia	University of Bochum Germany	University of Split Croatia
2014	EUG, Rotterdam Netherlands	14	24	333	Mykolas Romeris University Lithuania	Fatih University Turkey	University of Nis Serbia	University of Strasbourg France	University of Geneva Switzerland	University of Bochum Germany
2015	Koper Slovenia	15	28	372	Fatih University Turkey	University of Nis Serbia	University of Bologna Italy	University of Zagreb Croatia	University of Warsaw Poland	University of Strasbourg France
2016	EUG, Zagreb & Rijeka Croatia	16	36	494	Vytautas Magnus University Lithuania	University of Zagreb Croatia	Faith University Turkey	University of Zagreb Croatia	1 Decembrie 1918 University of Alba Iulia Romania	University of Belgrade Serbia
2017	Miskolc Hungary	16	28	367	University of Bologna Italy	University of Seville Spain	Maria Curie-Skłodowska University Poland	University of Strasbourg France	Singidunum University Serbia	University of Physical Education Hungary
2018	EUG, Coimbra Portugal	18	32	450	University of Bologna Italy	Beykent University Turkey	Tallinn University of Technology Estonia	University of Vienna Austria	University of Toulouse II - Jean Jaurès France	University of Strasbourg France
2019	Poznań Poland	14	26	349	University of Bologna Italy	Beykent University Turkey	Vytautas Magnus University Lithuania	University of Strasbourg France	University of Vienna Austria	University of Pitești Romania
2022	EUG, Łódź Poland	15	23	319	Beykent University Turkey	Vytautas Magnus University Lithuania	Masaryk University Czech Republic	University of Pitești Romania	Vasyl Stefanyk Precarpathian National University Ukraine	Charles University Czech Republic
2023	Aveiro Portugal	12	28	408	University of Bologna Italy	Vytautas Magnus University Lithuania	University of Seville Spain	University of Vienna Austria	University of Pitești Romania	University of Bologna Italy
2024	EUG, Miskolc Hungary	16	28	394	Vytautas Magnus University Lithuania	University of Zagreb Croatia	University of Seville Spain	University of Bologna Italy	University of Vienna Austria	University of Lyon France
2025	Bologna Italy	16	28	397	Vytautas Magnus University Lithuania	University of Bologna Italy	Polish Naval Academy Poland	University of Bologna Italy	University of Valencia Spain	University of Toulouse France
