= European Universities Rugby 7s Championships =

European Universities Rugby 7s Championships were included in the EUSA Sports Program in 2007 and are organised annually since.

The European Universities Rugby 7s Championships are coordinated by the European University Sports Association along with the 18 other sports on the program of the European universities championships.

== Overview ==
Overview of European Universities Rugby 7s Championships
	Location	Nb of countries	Nb of teams	Nb of participants	Men			Women		
					Winner	Finalist	Bronze Medallist	Winner	Finalist	Bronze Medallist
2007	Grenoble France	7	12	166	University of Wales Institute Cardiff United Kingdom	University of Leeds Met Carnegie United Kingdom	University of Pierre Mendes France of Grenoble France	*	*	*
2008	Rome Italy	9	9	147	University of Limoges France	University of Wales Institute Cardiff United Kingdom	University of Leeds United Kingdom	University of Northumbria United Kingdom	University of Lille France	*
2009	Bristol United Kingdom	5	12	218	Kuban State University of Physical Education, Sport and Tourism Russia	University of Coimbra Portugal	Bristol University United Kingdom	Exeter University United Kingdom	University of Lille France	Brunel University United Kingdom
2010	Cordoba Spain	6	12	188	University of Coimbra Portugal	University of Montpellier France	Dublin City University Ireland	University of Bordeaux France	University of A Coruna Spain	University of Barcelona Spain
2011	Lille France	*	*	244	STAPS Orsay France	University of Manchester United Kingdom	University of Bristol United Kingdom	University of Coimbra Portugal	University of Paris 13 Bobigny France	University of Lille Nord de France France
2012	European Universities Games Cordoba Spain	6	13	178	University of Pau and Pays de l'Adour France	University of the Basque Country Spain	University of Porto Portugal	University of Paris Bobigny France	University of Coimbra Portugal	University of Barcelona Spain
2013	Sofia Bulgaria	7	14	190	Georgian National University Georgia	University of Pau and Pays de l'Adour France	Moscow Aviation Institute Russia	Paul Sabatier University France	University of Coimbra Portugal	National Sports Academy Vasil Levski Bulgaria
2014	EUG, Rotterdam Netherlands	9	14	194	Georgian National University Georgia	Siberian Federal University Russia	Utrecht University Netherlands	University Toulouse 3 - Paul Sabatier France	National Sports Academy Vasil Levski Bulgaria	University of Porto Portugal
2015	Gödöllő Hungary	7	15	231	Georgian National University Georgia	Polytechnic University of Milan Italy	State University of Physical Education and Sport Moldova	University of Paris 13 France	University of Porto Portugal	University of Gloucestershire United Kingdom
