= European Universities Judo Championships =

Judo competition

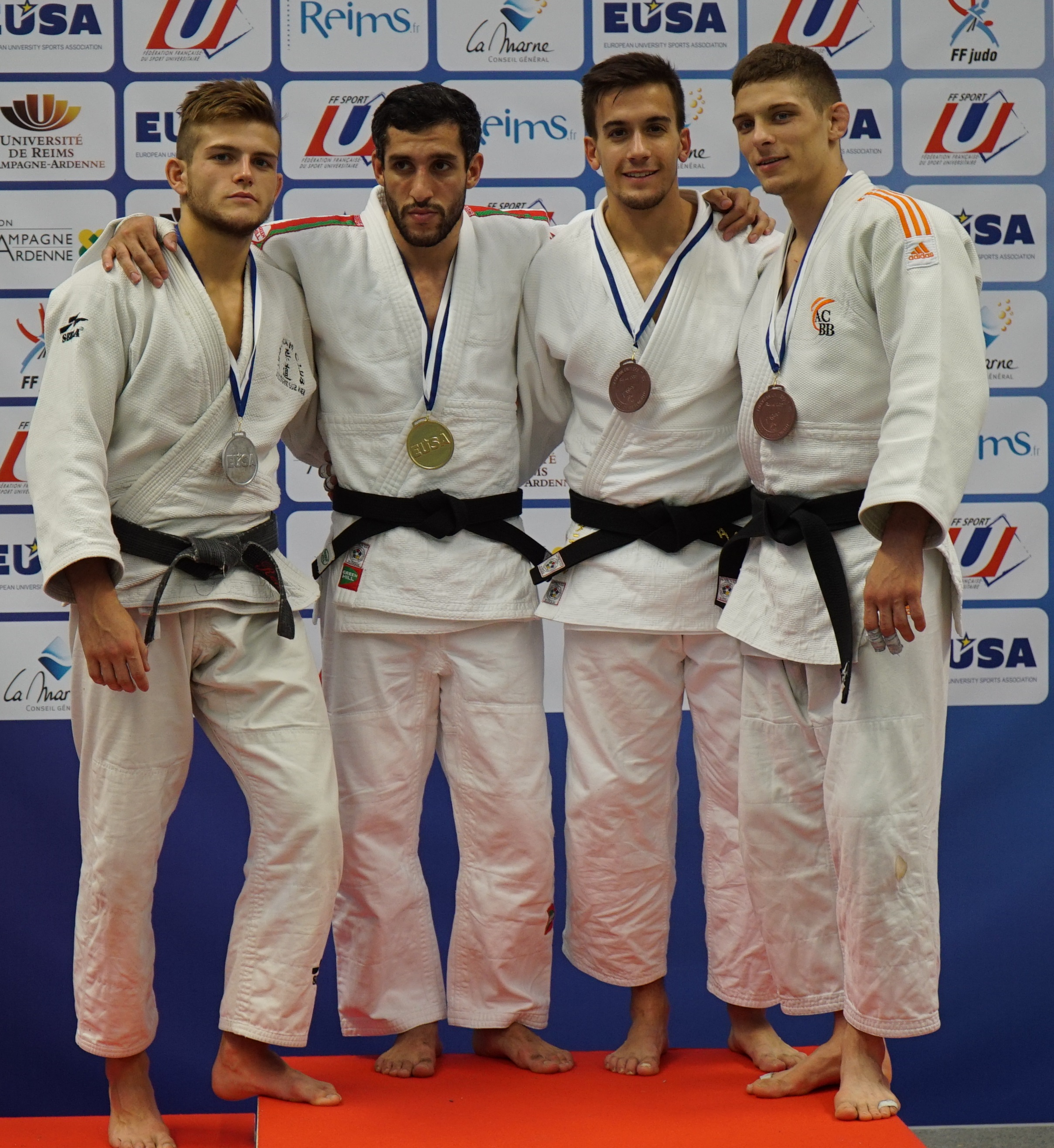
Under 66 podium, 2015

European Universities Judo Championships were the first organised in 1961. The 2nd edition was planned to be hosted in August 1962 in Huizingen (Belgium). In 1964 the championships were held in Delft (Holland). They were not repeated until 2011 (Sarajevo), 2013 (Coimbra) and 2015 (Paris). They are reinvented as part of European Universities Games.

The European Universities Judo Championships are currently coordinated by the European University Sports Association along with the 18 other sports on the program of the European universities championships.

== Summary ==
Edition	Year	Location	Nb of countries	Nb of universities	Nb of participants
1st EUC	2011	Bosnia and Herzegovina; Sarajevo	14	45	126
2nd EUC	2013	Portugal; Coimbra	15	62	150
3rd EUC	2015	France; Reims	15	83	162
4th EUC	2017	Portugal; Coimbra	*	*	*

== Results 2011 ==
Category		Winner	Silver Medalist	Bronze Medalist	Bronze Medalist
Male	-60 kg	TRBOVC, Matjaz; University of Maribor; Slovenia	ZAVDIL, Jan; Czech University Sport Association; Czech Republic	ACCORSI, Amedo; Centro Universitario Sportivo Milano; Italy	KOSCICA, Slobodan University of Banja Luka; Bosnia and Herzegovina
Male	-66 kg	VON FREEDEN, Niklas; University of Osnabruck; Germany	KONSTADINOVIC, Uros; University of Nis; Serbia	REIS, Philippe; University of Coimbra; Portugal	GACEMI, Medhi University UMLV; France
Male	-73 kg	MRDIC, Mitar; I. Sarajevo; Bosnia and Herzegovina	SEDMIDUVSKY, Vaclav; Czech zemedolska univerzita v Praze; Czech Republic	TAMELLIN Aleksandre; University Sciences Po Paris; France	FERNANDES Jorgen; University of Coimbra; Portugal
Male	-81 kg	IVEZIC, Miroljub; University of Belgrade; Serbia	OZERLER, Halil Ibrahim; Marmara University; Turkey	BARKIN BASOL, Mehmet Celal; Bayar University; Turkey	LUKAC, Aldin University of Travnik; Bosnia and Herzegovina
Male	-90 kg	KUKOLJ, Aleksandar; University of Belgrade; Serbia	GARTNER, Luka; University of Novi Sad; Serbia	LUKAC, Aldin; University of Travnik; Bosnia and Herzegovina	TAVRA, Ivan University of Split; Croatia
Male	-100 kg	DISOVIC, Milan; University of Belgrade; Serbia	PEREZ BALLESTER, David; University of Valencia; Spain	JAHIC, Jadranko; University of Sarajevo; Bosnia and Herzegovina	AMMON, Mallory University Staps Orsay; France
Male	+100 kg	MILADIN, Ibro; University of Travnik; Bosnia and Herzegovina	SUBOTIC, Drazen; University of I. Sarajevo; Bosnia and Herzegovina	SEHOVAC, Marko; University of I. Sarajevo; Bosnia and Herzegovina	SILVA, Diogo; University of Lisbon; Portugal
Female	-48 kg	SAVANOVIC, LJiljana; University of Nis; Serbia	KOMLJENOVIC, Dejana; University of Istocno Sarajevo; Bosnia and Herzegovina	CHAUVE, Tiphaine; University STAPS Paris Descartes; France	*
Female	-52 kg	DUPORT, Lucie; UPC Paris; France	RANKOVIC, Vesna; University of Novi Sad; Serbia	SOUSA, Ana; University of Coimbra; Portugal	SANTOS, Marta; University of Lisboa; Portugal
Female	-57 kg	RECEVEAUX, Helene; University La Sorbonne; France	TATALOVIC, Ana; University of Ljubljana; Slovenia	BEKIC, Andrea; University of Zagreb; Croatia	RUIZ, Julia; UPMC Paris; France
Female	-63 kg	PRUVOST, Marielle; UPMC Paris; France	MILJKOVIC, Milana; University of Belgrade; Serbia	KATIPOGLU, Busra; Marmara University; Turkey	BUKER, Bahar; Celal Bayar University; Turkey
Female	-70 kg	MIRJANIC, Branka; University of Ljubljana; Slovenia	ETIENNE, Valerijane; Uni Paris Est Créteil; France	POWELL, Natalie Anne; Cardiff University; United Kingdom	EISNER, Maite; University of Lausanne; Switzerland
Female	-78 kg	MENTOUOPOU, Geraldine; Staps Orsay; France	JONES, Fiona; Royal Holloway - University of London; United Kingdom	*	*
Female	+78 kg	ANDEOL, Emilie; UMLV; France	CERIC, Larisa; University of Travnik; Bosnia and Herzegovina	*	*

== Results 2013 ==
Category		Winner	Silver Medalist	Bronze Medalist	Bronze Medalist
Male	-60 kg	Sylvain Goulet; Pierre and Marie Curie University; France	*	*	*
Male	-66 kg	Joao Crisostomo; Lusophone University of Humanities and Technologies; Portugal	*	*	*
Male	-73 kg	Fernandes Jorge; University of Coimbra; Portugal	*	*	*
Male	-81 kg	Joris Rosselot; University of Nantes; France	*	*	*
Male	-90 kg	Valentin Jourdan; INSA Lyon; France	*	*	*
Male	-100 kg	Robin Reibedanz; European University Viadrina; Germany	*	*	*
Male	+100 kg	Diogo Silva; Nova University Lisbon; Portugal	*	*	*
Female	-48 kg	Melanie Clement; University of Reims Champagne-Ardenne; France	*	*	*
Female	-52 kg	Joana Ramos; University of Lisbon; Portugal	*	*	*
Female	-57 kg	Telma Monteiro; Pierre and Marie Curie University; France	*	*	*
Female	-63 kg	Jocelyne Mendy; University Paris-Est Creteil; France	*	*	*
Female	-70 kg	Evelien Berndsen; Hague University of Applied Sciences; Netherlands	*	*	*
Female	-78 kg	Natalie Powell; Cardiff University; United Kingdom	*	*	*
Female	+78 kg	Larisa Ceric; Travnik University; Bosnia and Herzegovina	*	*	*

== Results 2015 ==
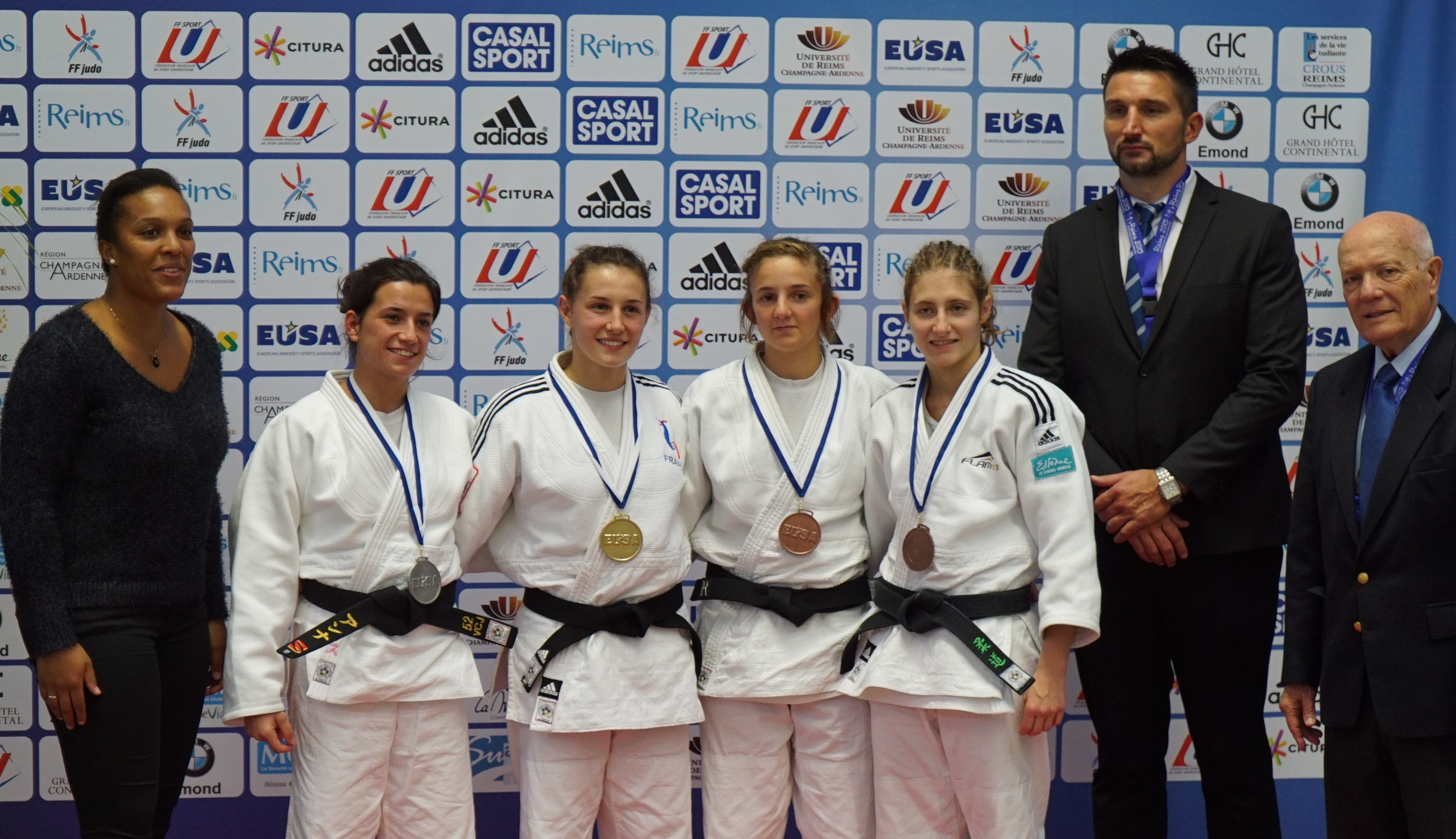
Women under 52

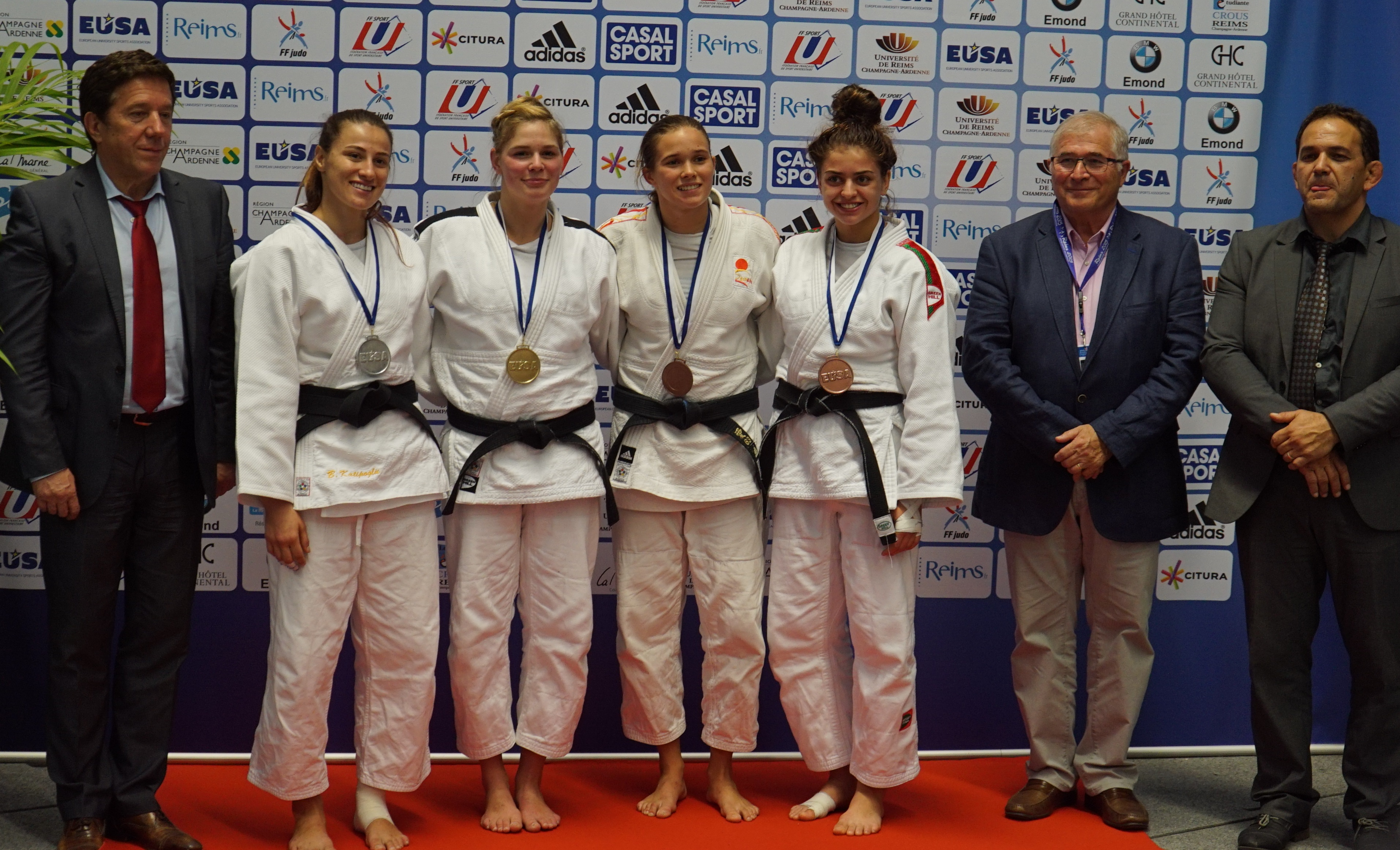
Women under 63

Category		Winner	Silver Medalist	Bronze Medalist	Bronze Medalist	
Male	-60 kg	Antoine Bidault France	Adam Conroy United Kingdom	Marcel Haupt Germany	Mathieu Groell Switzerland	
Male	-66 kg	Vae Tutkalian; Belarus	Remi Accarie France	Daniel Perez Roman Spain	Romain Recrozio France	
Male	-73 kg	Vaclav Sedmidubski Czech Republic	David Kraemer Germany	Philip Muller Germany	Nemaja Petrovic Serbia	
Male	Female	-48 kg	Dilara Lokmanheki Turkey	Stephanie Gerno France	Marlene Robert France	Mira Ulrich Germany
Male	Female	-52 kg	Marie Orsini France	Anna Perze Box Spain	Gabrielle Wuillot France	Eloise Combeau France
Male	Female	-57 kg	Manon Durbach France	Emily Dotzler Germany	Nazlican Ozerler Turkey	Sina Felske Germany
