= Miloš Gligorijević =

Serbian professional basketball coach (born 1976)

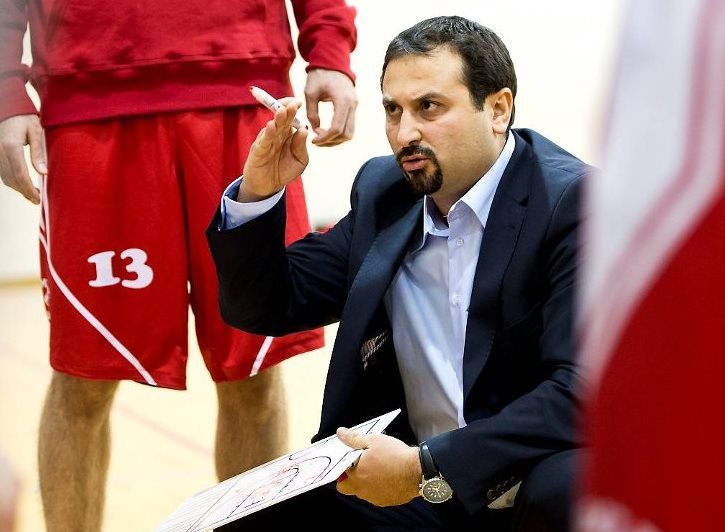
- Miloš Gligorijević in 2013

US Monastir
- Position: Head coach

Personal information
- Born: December 21, 1976 (age 49) Belgrade, SR Serbia, SFR Yugoslavia
- Coaching career: 2001–present

Career history

Coaching
- 2001–2009: KK Partizan (youth)
- 2008: University of Belgrade
- 2009–2013: KK Partizan (assistant)
- 2010: Serbia U18 (assistant)
- 2013: Serbia (assistant)
- 2013-2014: Gimle Basket
- 2015–2022: Georgia (assistant)
- 2018–2022: Georgia U20
- 2023: Ivory Coast (assistant)
- 2023-2024: US Monastir
- 2024-2025: Qingdao Eagles (youth)
- 2026-: China (youth)

Career highlights
- EUBC men runner-up (2008); BLNO men champion (2014); BLNO women runner-up (2014)

Miloš Gligorijević (Serbian: Милош Глигоријевић; born December 21, 1976) is a Serbian professional basketball coach, currently employed in Youth National Teams of China after working in youth program of Chinese CBA club Qingdao Eagles. His previous job was Head coach of Tunisian club US Monastir. Before that he served as Assistant coach of Ivory Coast men's National Team, and worked 7 years as coordinator of Youth National Teams in Georgian Basketball Federation, Head coach of Georgia U20 National Team and Assistant coach in Georgia men's National Team

== Coaching career ==
In 2001, at age of 24, Gligorijević started working in KK Partizan Youth Program.

2008, as a head coach of University of Belgrade, won second place at 8th European Universities Basketball Championship in Novi Sad.

In 2009, he was added to coaching staff of KK Partizan first team as assistant coach and contributed to all trophies won in next four seasons - 4 Serbian league titles, 3 National "Radivoj Korać cups" and 3 Adriatic league titles.

In October 2013, Gligorijević was named a head coach of Gimle Basket Bergen in Norwegian Premier Leagues (BLNO) with men's and women's team. With both teams, he won regular season competitions, with men was a winner of Final tournament, while with women won silver medal.

Most recently, he signed with Tunisian powerhouse US Monastir which competes in Pro A highest professional league in Tunisia and international BAL and later moved to China to work in Qingdao Eagles Youth Program.

On national level, in 2010 Gligorijević was member of coaching staff in Serbia U18 National Team at U18 European Championship and in 2013 assistant in Serbia Men's National Team at Eurobasket. From 2015, he was employed in Georgian Basketball Federation on various positions in Youth Program and Men's National Team and represented Georgia on European Championships 2015, 2017 and 2022 and on numerous youth competitions. In 2023, he became assistant in coaching staff of Ivory Coast Men's National Team in their preparation and participation in the World Cup in Indonesia. 2026. China became fourth country Gligorijević represents internationally since he was included in CBA Youth National Teams Program.
