= European Universities Handball Championships =

European Universities Handball Championships were included on the EUSA Sports Program in 2006 and have been organised annually since.

The European Universities Handball Championships are coordinated by the European University Sports Association along with the 18 other sports on the program of the European universities championships.

== Overview ==
Overview of European Universities Handball Championships
	Location	Nb of countries	Nb of teams	Nb of participants	Men			Women		
2006	Besançon France	11	18	225	University of Besançon France	University of Braga Portugal	University of Lyon France	University of Piotrkow Trybunalski Poland	University of Besançon France	University of Valence France
2007	Lodz Poland	13	20	260	Belarusian State University Belarus	University of Minho Portugal	Gazi University Turkey	Friedrich-Alexander University Erlangen-Nürnberg Germany	Koszalin University of Technology Poland	Belarusian State University of Physical Culture Belarus
2008	Niš Serbia	13	21	347	University of Ljubljana Slovenia	Gazi University Turkey	German Sport University Cologne Germany	University of Vincent Pol Lublin Poland	University of Niš Serbia	University of Almeria Spain
2009	Ljubljana Slovenia	10	19	317	Russian State University of Physical Education, Sport and Tourism Russia	University of Minho Portugal	University of Ljubljana Slovenia	University of Vincent Pol Lublin Poland	University of Ljubljana Slovenia	Erlangen-Nürnberg University Germany
2010	Nicosia Cyprus	11	18	271	INSA Lyon France	University of Minho Portugal	Universidad de Malaga Spain	University of Vincent Pol Poland	Belarusian National Technical University Belarus	University of Porto Portugal
2011	Rijeka Croatia	13	27	432	University of Minho Portugal	University of Rijeka Croatia	University of Malaga Spain	Rostov Institute Russian State University of Trade and Economics Russia	University of Rijeka Croatia	University of Zagreb Croatia
2012	European Universities Games Cordoba Spain	12	20	315	Georgian Technical University Georgia	University J.J. Strossmayer Osijek Croatia	University of Minho Portugal	University of Vincent Pol Poland	Lithuanian Academy of Physical Education Lithuania	Akdeniz University Turkey
2013	Katowice Poland	10	20	*	University of Minho Portugal	University J.J. Strossmayer Osijek Croatia	Opole University of Technology Poland	Lviv State University of Physical Culture Ukraine	University of Vincent Pol Lublin Poland	University of Berlin Germany
2014	EUG, Rotterdam Netherlands	9	17	262	University of Minho Portugal	University of Novi Sad Croatia	Gazi University Turkey	University of Vincent Pol Lublin Poland	University of South Toulon-Var France	Radboud University Nijmegen Netherlands
2015	Braga Portugal	7	15	231	University of Minho Portugal	University of Córdoba Spain	University of Strasbourg France	University of Vincent Pol Lublin Poland	University of Applied Sciences Wiesbaden Germany	University of Malaga Spain
2016	EUG, Zagreb&Rijeka Croatia	14	28	434	University of Niš Serbia	German Sport University Cologne Germany	University of Minho Portugal	University of Rijeka Croatia	Lithuanian Sports University Lithuania	University of Zagreb Croatia
2017	Antequera Spain	12	22	363	Ștefan cel Mare University of Suceava Romania	University of Duisburg-Essen Germany	University of Montpellier France	German Sport University Cologne Germany	University of Aveiro Portugal	Radboud University Nijmegen Netherlands
2018	EUG, Coimbra Portugal	12	23	363	University of Bochum Germany	Aix-Marseille University France	Ștefan cel Mare University of Suceava Romania	Aix-Marseille University France	Radboud University Nijmegen Netherlands	University of Belgrade Serbia
2019	Bydgoszcz Poland	11	22	352	University of Granada Spain	German Sport University Cologne Germany	University of Minho Portugal	University of Vincent Pol Lublin Poland	University of Hamburg Germany	Aix-Marseille University France
2022	EUG, Lodz Poland	15	24	365	Ștefan cel Mare University of Suceava Romania	University of Granada Spain	University of Minho Portugal	Lviv State University of Physical Culture Ukraine	University of Zagreb Croatia	University of Bordeaux France
2023	Podgorica Montenegro	11	23	347	Ștefan cel Mare University of Suceava Romania	Côte d'Azur University France	University of Minho Portugal	Ovidius University Romania	Hungarian University of Sports Science Hungary	University of Zagreb Croatia
2024	EUG, Debrecen Hungary	11	23	383	Ștefan cel Mare University of Suceava Romania	University of Duisburg-Essen Germany	University of Zurich Switzerland	Ovidius University Romania	Palacký University Olomouc Czech Republic	Hungarian University of Sports Science Hungary
2025	Debrecen Hungary	9	24	415	Côte d'Azur University France	Ștefan cel Mare University of Suceava Romania	University of Zagreb Croatia	Hungarian University of Sports Science Hungary	University of Leon Spain	Politehnica University of Bucharest Romania
