= 2022 European Universities Games =

European Universities Games 2022
- Host city: Łódź
- Country: Poland
- Nations: 37
- Athletes: 4,459
- Events: 20
- Opening: 17 July 2022
- Closing: 30 July 2022
- Website: www.eug2022.eu

The 2022 European University Games was the 5th biannual European Universities Games (EUG). It was held in Łódź, Poland from 17 July to 30 July. It was organised by the European University Sports Association (EUSA) and University Sports Association of Poland (AZS) with the cooperation of Łódź University of Technology.

== Sport events ==
- Badminton
- Basketball
- Basketball 3x3
- Beach handball
- Beach volleyball
- Chess
- Football
- Futsal
- Handball
- Judo
- Karate
- Kickboxing
- Sport climbing
- Swimming
- Table tennis
- Para table tennis
- Taekwondo
- Tennis
- Volleyball
- Water polo

== Medal table ==
* Host nation (Poland)

Rank	Nation	Gold	Silver	Bronze	Total
1	Poland (POL)*	24	27	32	83
2	Turkey (TUR)	22	19	8	49
3	Ukraine (UKR)	19	25	18	62
4	France (FRA)	18	18	18	54
5	Hungary (HUN)	15	12	22	49
6	Great Britain (GBR)	11	6	17	34
7	Portugal (POR)	6	7	22	35
8	Czech Republic (CZE)	6	2	9	17
9	Lithuania (LTU)	5	5	8	18
10	Croatia (CRO)	4	4	9	17
11	Germany (GER)	3	10	20	33
12	Austria (AUT)	3	7	9	19
13	Spain (ESP)	3	2	6	11
14	Bosnia and Herzegovina (BIH)	3	1	2	6
15	Romania (ROU)	3	0	1	4
16	Ireland (IRL)	2	1	3	6
17	Georgia (GEO)	2	1	1	4
18	North Macedonia (MKD)	2	0	1	3
18	Norway (NOR)	2	0	1	3
20	Slovakia (SVK)	1	3	5	9
21	Italy (ITA)	1	2	2	5
22	Netherlands (NED)	1	1	2	4
23	Armenia (ARM)	1	0	1	2
23	Finland (FIN)	1	0	1	2
25	Kosovo (KOS)	0	2	0	2
26	Switzerland (SUI)	0	1	5	6
27	Slovenia (SLO)	0	1	2	3
28	Cyprus (CYP)	0	0	1	1
28	Greece (GRE)	0	0	1	1
28	Latvia (LAT)	0	0	1	1
Totals (30 entries)		158	157	228	543
