= European Universities Tennis Championships =

European Universities Tennis Championships were the first organised in 2004 and have been organised annually since. They are coordinated by the European University Sports Association along with the 18 other sports on the program of the European universities championships.

== Overview ==
Overview of European Universities Tennis Championships
	Location	Nb of countries	Nb of teams	Nb of participants	Men			Women		
					Winner	Finalist	Bronze Medallist	Winner	Finalist	Bronze Medallist
2004	Touques France	6	14	*	University of Rouen France	Joseph Fourier University, Grenoble France	University of Cologne Germany	Russian State University of Physical Education, Sports and Tourism Russia	Paul Verlaine University Metz France	Pierre Mendès University, Grenoble France
2005	Rouen France	8	17	45	University of Moscow Sad Russia	University of Cologne Germany	London Metropolitan University United Kingdom	University of Paris France	University of Warsaw Poland	University of Grenoble France
2006	Eindhoven Netherlands	13	27	94	London Metropolitan University United Kingdom	Eindhoven University of Technology Netherlands	University of Fribourg Switzerland	Moscow State University of Economics, Statistics and Informatics Russia	ETH Zürich Switzerland	Academy of Physical Education of Warsaw Poland
2007	Moscow Russia	13	30	109	Russian State University of Physical Education, Sport and Tourism Russia	Stockholm School of Economics Sweden	London Metropolitan University United Kingdom	Russian State University of Physical Education, Sport and Tourism Russia	Moscow State University of Economics, Statistics and Informatics Russia	London Metropolitan University United Kingdom
2008	Dublin Ireland	11	27	88	London Metropolitan University United Kingdom	Moscow State University Russia	Stockholm School of Economics Sweden	London Metropolitan University United Kingdom	University of Münster United Kingdom	Warsaw University of Technology United Kingdom
2009	Poznań Poland	10	22	66	University of Rouen II France	Warsaw School of Social Psychology Poland	University of Rouen I France	Technical University of Ostrava Czech Republic	Moscow University of Economics, Statistics and Informatics Russia	University of Valencia Spain
2010	Coimbra Portugal	16	34	122	Kozminski University, Warsow Poland	University of Zagreb Croatia	Stockholm University Sweden	University of Leonard de Vinci France	MESI Moscow Russia	University of Zagreb Croatia
2011	St. Gallen Switzerland	12	23	90	University of Poitiers France	Moscow MESI Russia	Adam Mickiewicz University of Poznań Poland	Moscow MESI Russia	University School of Physical Education in Wrocław Poland	Kozminski University Poland
2012	EUG, Córdoba Spain	16	31	*	University of Rouen France	University of Poitiers France	University of Sterling United Kingdom	Moscow MESI Russia	PRES Clermont University France	Kozminski University Poland
2013	Bar Montenegro	14	23	*	Moscow MESI Russia	University Joseph Fourier of Grenoble France	University of Sterling United Kingdom	Moscow MESI Russia	University Paris Dauphine France	University of Montenegro Montenegro
2014	EUG, Rotterdam Netherlands	15	27	121	Istanbul Aydın University Turkey	Kozminski University Poland	Moscow MESI Russia	University of Bordeaux France	Moscow MESI Russia	University of Split Croatia
2015	Wrocław Poland	*	*	*	*	*	*	*	*	*
2016	EUG, Zagreb & Rijeka Croatia	*	*	*	*	*	*	*	*	*
2017	Madrid Spain	*	*	*	*	*	*	*	*	*
2018	EUG, Coimbra Portugal	*	*	*	*	*	*	*	*	*
