= European Universities Volleyball Championships =

The European Universities Volleyball Championships were the first championships, along with the European Universities Basketball Championships, to be included on the EUSA Sports Program.

They have been organised annually since 2001.

The European Universities Volleyball Championships are coordinated by the European University Sports Association, along with the 18 other sports on the program of the European Universities Championships.

== Overview ==
Overview of European Universities Volleyball Championships
Year	Location	Nb of countries	Nb of teams	Nb of participants	Men			Women		
					Winner	Finalist	Bronze Medallist	Winner	Finalist	Bronze Medallist
2001	Uzice, Vrbas Serbia	9	14	*	University of Novi Sad Serbia	University of Athens Greece	University of Maribor Slovenia	Užice University Serbia	Commenius University of Bratislava Slovakia	University Paris VII France
2002	Athens Greece	13	24	*	National Juridical Academy of Ukraine Ukraine	University of Montpellier I France	Moldova State University Chisinau Moldova	Ternopil Academy of National Economy Ukraine	University of Athens Greece	Dresden University of Technology Germany
2003	Maribor Slovenia	10	22	*	University of Montpellier I France	Technical University of Eindhoven Netherlands	University of Ljubljana Slovenia	CUS Roma Italy	Academy of Physical Education Warsaw Poland	University of Osijek Croatia
2004	Braga Portugal	9	17	*	University of Zagreb Croatia	University of Ljubljana Slovenia	Technical University of Munich Germany	Academy of Physical Education and Sport Gdansk Poland	Technical University of Munich Germany	University of Reims France
2005	Tallinn Estonia	13	22	*	University of Latvia Latvia	University of Ljubljana Slovenia	Lodz University Poland	Academy of Physical Education and Sport Gdansk Poland	University of Tartu Estonia	Technical University of Eindhoven Netherlands
2006	Eindhoven Netherlands	18	32	418	Eindhoven University of Technology Netherlands	Surgut State University Russia	University of Warmia and Mazury Poland	Eindhoven University of Technology Netherlands	La Sapienza Roma Italy	Technical University of Munich Germany
2007	Rijeka Croatia	17	35	439	Gazi University Turkey	Sibirian Federal University Russia	State Higher Vocational School Raciborz Poland	Russian State University of Physical Education, Sport and Tourism Russia	University of Ljubljana Slovenia	Technical University of Czestochowa Poland
2008	Camerino Italy	16	32	412	Russian State University of Physical Education, Sport and Tourism Russia	Aristotle University Greece	Gazi University Turkey	Russian State University of Physical Education, Sport and Tourisme Russia	Hochschulsport Hamburg Germany	University of Economics Bydgoszcz Poland
2009	Hamburg Germany	8	19	247	Mordovskiy State University Russia	Russian State University of Physical Education, Sport and Tourism Russia	Gazi University Turkey	University of Economics Bydgoszcz Poland	University of Hamburg Germany	Russian State University of Physical Education, Sport and Tourism Russia
2010	Warsaw Poland	13	25	329	Mordovskiy State University Russia	Eindhoven University Netherlands	Gazi University Turkey	Bahcesehir University Turkey	University of Belgrade Serbia	Kazan State Institute Russia
2011	Kragujevac Serbia	12	16	218	University of Kragujevac Serbia	University of Belgrade Serbia	Mordovskiy State University Russia	Chemnitz University Germany	University of Montepellier France	University of Porto Portugal
2013	Nicosia Cyprus	16	26	*	Technical University of Munich Germany	University of Nis Serbia	University Paul Sabatier of Toulouse France	University of Cyprus Cyprus	Kuban State University of Physical Education, Sport and Tourism Russia	Moscow State Agro-Engineering University Russia
2015	Camerino Italy	17	26	400	University of Almeria Spain	Technical University of Munich Germany	University of Konstanz Germany	Tambov State University Russia	University Vasile Alecsandri of Bacau Romania	Technical University of Munich Germany
2017	Rzeszow Poland	15	20	280	University of Rzeszow Poland	University Toulouse III - Paul Sabatier France	University of Nis Serbia	University “Vasile Alecsandri” of Bacau Romania	University of Bordeaux France	Eindhoven University of Technology Netherlands
2018	Coimbra Portugal	18	32	448	Beykent University Turkey	University Toulouse III – Paul Sabatier France	University of Nis Serbia	University of Lausanne Switzerland	University of Belgrade Serbia	University of Rijeka Croatia
2019	Lodz Poland	17	29	405	Beykent University Turkey	Josip Juraj Strossmayer University of Osijek Croatia	University of Montpellier France	University of Bologna Italy	Istanbul Aydin University Turkey	University of Rijeka Croatia
2022	Lodz Poland	17	28	385	Beykent University Turkey	Gazi University Turkey	Masaryk University Czech Republic	University of Bologna Italy	University of Venice Italy	University of Zagreb Croatia
2023	Braga Portugal	10	25	371	West University of Timisoara Romania	University of Rostock Germany	University of Wurzburg Germany	University of Bologna Italy	German Sport University Cologne Germany	University of Zagreb Croatia
2024	Lodz Poland	13	27	393	University of Rostock Germany	Brno University of Technology Czech Republic	West University of Timisoara Romania	University of Bologna Italy	University of Zagreb Croatia	Ovidius University Romania
2025	Budapest Hungary	15	30	445	Karlsruhe Institute of Technology Germany	Fenerbahce University Turkey	Technical University of Dresden Germany	Hungarian University of Sports Science Hungary	Yasar University Turkey	Ovidius University Romania
