= European Universities Bridge Championships =

University games

European Universities Bridge Championships were the first organised in 2009 and have been organised on a bi-annual basis since.

The European Universities Bridge Championships are coordinated by the European University Sports Association along with the 18 other sports on the program of the European universities championships.

== Overview ==
Overview of European Universities Bridge Championships
	Location	Countries	Teams	Players	Team			Pairs		
					Winner	Finalist	Bronze Medalist	Winner	Finalist	Bronze Medalist
2009	Opatia Croatia	11	22	108	Technical University of Wrocław Poland	Paris University France	Hogskolen i Sor-Trondelag University Norway	*	*	*
2011	Warsaw Poland	6	14	57	University of Hamburg Germany	Wroclaw University of Technology Poland	University of Warsaw II Poland	*	*	*
2013	Kraljevica Croatia	8	11	70	Wroclaw University of Technology Poland	University of Potsdam Germany	Institute of Chemical Technology Czech Republic	Roman Kowalewski / Lukasz Nierzwicki, Gdansk University of Technology Poland	Wouter Van den Hove / Sam Bahbout, Karel de Grote University College Belgium	Ahmet Can Ozer / Ekrem Serdar, Anadolu University Turkey
2015	Warsaw Poland	*	*	*	*	*	*	*	*	*
2017	Fuengirola Spain	*	*	*	*	*	*	*	*	*
