= Finnish Student Sports Federation =

Finnish Student Sports Federation (OLL) is a national organisation advocating, supporting and promoting the interests of students' sports and physical activities. The federation was founded in 1924. The federation's office is in Helsinki.

There are about 250 000 university and polytechnic students in Finland. The Sports Federation aims to provide them all with opportunities for various physical activities. It cooperates with public administration, students' unions, sports secretaries and sport centres, Finnish Student Health Service, sports organisations and many others.

All students of SAMOK, Union of Students in Finnish Universities of Applied Sciences, and SYL, The National Union of University Students in Finland, are members of Finnish Student Sports Federation.

== International relations ==
The Finnish Student Sports Federation is a member of FISU, International University Sports Federation and EUSA, European University Sports Association. Furthermore, OLL cooperates with Nordic Sport Federations and student organizations in Baltic countries, especially with the ones in Estonia.

SELL Student Games are organised by Estonian, Finnish, Latvian and Lithuanian student sports organisations. They are held annually in the Baltic region, taking place every fourth year in Finland.

Finnish Student Sports Federation (OLL) coordinates Finnish teams to European Universities Championships and World University Championships. OLL also selects national athletes and teams to summer and winter universiade – held every two years.
