= European Universities Golf Championships =

European Universities Golf Championships were included on the EUSA Sports Program in 2009 and are organised on a bi-annual basis since.

The European Universities Golf Championships are coordinated by the European University Sports Association along with the 18 other sports on the program of the European universities championships.

== Overview ==
Overview of European Universities Golf Championships
| | Location | Nb of countries | Nb of teams | Nb of participants | Men | | | Women | | | Individual Men | | | Individual Women | | |
| | | | | | Winner | Finalist | Bronze Medalist | Winner | Finalist | Bronze Medalist | Winner | Finalist | Bronze Medalist | Winner | Finalist | Bronze Medalist |
| 2009 | Algrave Spain | 8 | 8 | 69 | University of Maynooth Ireland | University of Ulster Ireland | University of Cork Ireland | * | * | * | * | * | * | * | * | * |
| 2010 | no competition | | | | | | | | | | | | | | | |
| 2011 | Otočec Slovenia | 8 | 17 | 81 | University of Stirling United Kingdom | University College Cork Ireland | National University of Ireland Ireland | University of Stirling United Kingdom | University of St Andrews United Kingdom | University of Ljubljana Slovenia | * | * | * | * | * | * |
| 2012 | no competition | | | | | | | | | | | | | | | |
| 2013 | St Saens France | 7 | 18 | 86 | University of Stirling United Kingdom | Halmstad University Sweden | National University of Ireland, Maynooth Ireland | Halmstad University Sweden | University of Stirling United Kingdom | National University of Ireland, Maynooth Ireland | Markus Enoksson, University of Halmstad Sweden | Alexander Culverwell, University of Stirling United Kingdom | Phillip Ericksson, University of Halmstad Sweden | Emma Vestin, University of Halmstad Sweden | Eilidh Briggs, University of Stirling United Kingdom | Therese Larsson, University of Halmstad Sweden |
| 2014 | no competition | | | | | | | | | | | | | | | |
| 2015 | St Gallen Switzerland | * | * | * | * | * | * | * | * | * | * | * | * | * | * | * |
