= 2018 European Universities Games =

European Universities Games 2018
- Host city: Coimbra
- Country: Portugal
- Opening: 15 July 2018
- Closing: 28 July 2018
- Website: www.eug2018.com

The 2018 European University Games was the fourth biannual European Universities Games (EUG). It was held in Coimbra, Portugal from 15 July to 28 July and was organised by the European University Sports Association (EUSA) and Portuguese University Sport Federation (FADU) with the cooperation of University of Coimbra, Municipality of Coimbra, and the Academic Association of Coimbra (AAC).

== Sports ==
- Badminton
- Basketball
- 3x3 basketball
- Canoe sprint
- Football
- Futsal
- Handball
- Judo
- Rowing
- Rugby sevens
- Table tennis
- Tennis
- Volleyball
