= European Universities Karate Championships =

Karate competition

European Universities Karate Championships were first organised in 2003 and have been organised every two years since.

The European Universities Karate Championships are coordinated by the European University Sports Association along with the 18 other sports on the program of the European universities championships.

== Summary ==
Edition	Year	Location	Countries	Teams	Participants
1st EUC	2003	Montenegro; Podgorica	5	*	50
2nd EUC	2005	Poland; Wroclaw	12	18	150
3rd EUC	2007	Montenegro; Podgorica	17	*	121
4th EUC	2009	Spain; Cordoba	13	37*	234
5th EUC	2011	Bosnia and Herzegovina; Sarajevo	23	78*	240
6th EUC	2013	Hungary; Budapest	27	*	350
7th EUC	2015	Portugal; Coimbra	*	*	*
8th EUC	2017	Montenegro; Zabljak	*	*	*

== Results 2003 ==
Category		Winner
Male Kumite	-60 kg	P. Bajić, Sports Academy of Belgrade; Serbia
Male Kumite	-65 kg	S. Glišić, Sports Academy of Belgrade; Serbia
Male Kumite	-70 kg	B. Sekulić, University of Podgorica; Serbia
Male Kumite	-75 kg	V. Miljanić, University of Belgrade; Serbia
Male Kumite	-80 kg	M. Živković, Sports Academy of Belgrade; Serbia
Male Kumite	+80 kg	O. Mandarić, University of Mostar; Bosnia and Herzegovina
Male Kumite	Open	M. Živković, Sports Academy of Belgrade; Serbia
Male Kumite	Team	University of Sarajevo; Serbia
Female Kumite	-53 kg	T. Suica, University of Podgorica; Serbia
Female Kumite	-60 kg	K. Štrika, University of Podgorica; Serbia
Female Kumite	+60 kg	V. Vrhovac, University of Belgrade; Serbia
Female Kumite	Open	S. Perić, University of Podgorica; Serbia
Female Kumite	Team	University of Podgorica; Serbia
Kata	Male Individual	T. Kiziltoprak, University of Oldenburg; Germany
Kata	Female Individual	I. Djuričkov, Sports Academy of Belgrade; Serbia
Kata	Male Team	University of Podgorica; Serbia
Kata	Female Team	University of Podgorica; Serbia

== Results 2005 ==
Category		Winner	Silver Medallist	Bronze Medallist	Bronze Medallist
Male Kumite	-60 kg	Robert Glavas - Vienna University of Economics and Business Administration; Serbia	Selcuk Aksu - Atatürk University; Turkey	Łukasz Klujew - University of Physical Educ. Wroclaw; Serbia	Florent Gaubard - Franche-Comté University; France
Male Kumite	-65 kg	Milan Burget - University Palackeho Olomouk; Czech Republic	Drasko Stojanovic - Beogradski University; Serbia	Luka Stajovic - University Montenegro; Montenegro	Dejan Ivanovic - University Montenegro; Montenegro
Male Kumite	-70 kg	M. Salih Kurnaz - Balikesir University; Turkey	Christian Gruner - Friedrich-Schiller Universitat Jena; Germany	Marko Peric - Beogradski University; Serbia	Hacen Hamour - Paris 10 University; France
Male Kumite	-75 kg	Muslum Basturk - Trakya University; Turkey	Andrzej Studziński - University of Physical Educ. Wroclaw; Poland	Łukasz Lulek - University of Physical Educ. Wroclaw; Poland	Dejan Jovovic - University Montenegro; Montenegro
Male Kumite	-80 kg	Bartołomiej Sołtysiak - University of Physical Educ. Wroclaw; Poland	Emrah Uygur - Karadeniz Technical University; Turkey	Tobias Ackermann - Friedrich-Schiller Universitat Jena; Germany	Sergiy Batayew - Lviv State of Physical Culture; Ukraine
Male Kumite	+80 kg	Toko Rajcevic - University Montenegro; Montenegro	Veljko Brnovic - University Montenegro; Montenegro	Igor Mitic - Beogradski University; Serbia	Michał Głowacki - Agricultural University Of Wroclaw; Poland
Male Kumite	Open	Muslum Basturk - Trakya University; Turkey	Miroslav Hýsek - JU Cesky Budejovice; Czech Republic	Piotr Szumiło - Agricultural University Of Wroclaw; Poland	Michał Głowacki - Agricultural University Of Wroclaw; Poland
Male Kumite	Team	Poland I Poland	Turkey; Turkey	Germany; Germany	Serbia & Montenegro; Serbia
Female Kumite	-53 kg	Marta Szymczak - University of Physical Educ. Wroclaw; Poland	Oksana Yashchysjyn - Lviv State of Physical Culture; Ukraine	Biliana Stojovic - Beogradski University; Serbia	Jelena Stevanovic - Sportska Akademija; Serbia
Female Kumite	-60 kg	Ines Brutscher - University of Applied Sciences Würzburg-Schweinfurt; Germany	Anna Fajkowska - Akademia Bydgoska; Poland	Rita Foppe - Technische Universitat Braunschweig; Germany	Sonya Anderl - Universitat Vien; Austria
Female Kumite	+60 kg	Radka Krejčová - University of Hradec Kralove; Czech Republic	Petra Peceková - JU Uveske Budejovice; Czech Republic	Agnieszka Szumlańska - PWSZ Legnica; Czech Republic	Silvia Hagen - Universitaet Bielfeld; Germany
Female Kumite	Open	Petra Peceková - JU Uveske Budejovice; Czech Republic	Radka Krejčová - University of Hradec Kralove; Czech Republic	Agnieszka Szumlańska - PWSZ Legnica; Poland	Anna Fajkowska - Akademia Bydgoska; Poland
Female Kumite	Team	Germany; Germany	Poland; Poland	SCG; Serbia and Montenegro	Czech Republic; Czech Republic
Kata	Male Individual	Mucip Uludag - Ege University; Turkey	Jindřich Pilmann - Charles University Prague; Czech Republic	Patrick Rump - Universitat Frankfurt am Main; Germany	Roland Breiteneder - Technische Universitat Wien; Austria
Kata	Female Individual	Miroslava Vasekova - Technicka Univerzita Zvolen; Czech Republic	Anna Koryagina - Lviv State of Physical Culture; Ukraine	Marina Kis - University Montenegro; Serbia and Montenegro	Milena Mliacic - University Montenegro; Serbia and Montenegro
Kata	Male Team	Austria; Austria	Czech Republic; Czech Republic	Turkey; Turkey	Poland; Poland
Kata	Female Team	Serbia and Montenegro; Serbia	Czech Republic; Czech Republic	Poland; Poland	Serbia and Montenegro; Serbia and Montenegro

== Results 2007 ==
Category		Winner
Male Kumite	-60 kg	Jovan Radulovic; Mediteran University; Montenegro
Male Kumite	-65 kg	Peter Macko; Comenuis University Bratislava; Slovakia
Male Kumite	-70 kg	Andre Beck; Friedrich Schiller University Jena; Germany
Male Kumite	-75 kg	Milos Jovanovic; University of Novi Sad; Serbia
Male Kumite	-80 kg	Alton Brown; South Bank University London; United Kingdom
Male Kumite	+80 kg	Almir Cecunjanin; Mediteran University; Montenegro
Male Kumite	Open	Dejan Umicevic; University of Novi Sad; Serbia
Male Kumite	Team	Dieburg University; Germany
Female Kumite	-53 kg	Biljana Stojovic; University of Belgrade; Serbia
Female Kumite	-60 kg	Sonja Steland; University of Luxemburg; Luxembourg
Female Kumite	+60 kg	Tamara Filipovic; University of Belgrade; Serbia
Female Kumite	Open	Sofia Borou; TEI Piraeus; Greece
Female Kumite	Team	University of Belgrade; Serbia
Kata	Male Individual	Minh Dack Vu Dac; Pole University Leonardo da Vinci; France
Kata	Female Individual	Milena Milacic; University of Montenegro; Montenegro
Kata	Male Team	University of Belgrade; Serbia
Kata	Female Team	University of Montenegro; Montenegro

== Results 2009 ==
Category		Winner	Silver Medallist	Bronze Medallist	Bronze Medallist
Male Kumite	-60 kg	Jose Ramn Fernandez; University Of La Laguna; Spain	Mikel Lafuente; University Of Basque Country; Spain	Sergio Martínez Serrano; Polytechnic University Of Valencia; Spain	Paulo Andre Gonçalves; University Of Minho; Portugal
Male Kumite	-67 kg	Alvaro Jiménez; University Of Castilla La Mancha; Spain	Mickael Lopes; Leonard De Vinci University; France	Vctor Prez; University Of Malaga; Spain	Manuel Rasero; Technical University Of Madrid; Spain
Male Kumite	-75 kg	Kenji Grillon; Leonard De Vinci University; France	Benedict Vincent; University Of Montpellier; France	Rubn De Dios; Technical University Of Madrid; Spain	Alton Brown; British Universities And Colleges Sports; United Kingdom
Male Kumite	-84 kg	Heinrich Leisterschneider; University Of Regensburg; Germany	Dejan Jovovic; University Of Montenegro; Montenegro	Adrin Martínez; University Of Granada; Spain	Amir Begovik; Ss. Cyril And Methodius Univ In Skopje; North Macedonia
Male Kumite	+84 kg	Zarko Arsovski; Goce Delcev University In Stip; North Macedonia	Hugo Soares; Saarbrcken University; Germany	Callum Robb; British Universities And Colleges Sports; United Kingdom	Martin Nestorovski; Ss. Cyril And Methodius University In Skopje; North Macedonia
Male Kumite	Team	Ss. Cyril And Methodius University In Skopje; North Macedonia	Technical University Of Madrid; Spain	British Universities And Colleges Sports; United Kingdom	Polytechnic Institute Of Porto; Portugal
Female Kumite	-50 kg	Maria Jos Gonzlez; University Of Las Palmas De Gran Canaria; Spain	Ruth Jiménez; Camilo Jose Cela University; Spain	Estela Benita; University Of Valencia; Spain	Chloe Mcclean; British Universities And Colleges Sports; United Kingdom
Female Kumite	-55 kg	Natasa Illievska; Ss. Cyril And Methodius University In Skopje; North Macedonia	Tamara Amador; University Of Basque Country; Spain	Sonja Anderl; University Of Vienna; Austria	Alba Esteve; Cardenal Herrera University; Spain
Female Kumite	-61 kg	Cristina Ferrer; University Of Barcelona; Spain	Ivonne Gonzlez; University Of Las Palmas Gran Canaria; Spain	Esther Peña; Autonomous University Of Barcelona; Spain	Iratxe Larrañaga; University Of Basque Country; Spain
Female Kumite	+68 kg	Cristina Vizcano; Technical University Of Madrid; Spain	Jessica Gordon; University Of Basque Country; Spain	Emmeline Mottet; Insa Lyon University; France	Amy Thomason; British Universities And Colleges Sports; United Kingdom
Female Kumite	Team	University Of Las Palmas Gran Canaria; Spain	Montenegro University Sport Federation; Montenegro	University Of Basque Country; Spain	Leonard De Vinci University; France
Kata	Male Individual	Damin Quintero; Technical University Of Madrid; Spain	Arslan Aliskan; Erciyes University; Turkey	Francisco Jose Salazar; University Of Alcal; Spain	Kenichi Sato; Kaiserslautern University; Germany
Kata	Female Individual	Yaiza Martn; Catholic Of San Antonio University; Spain	Belen Martín; University Of Valladolid; Spain	Ruth Jiménez; Camilo Jose Cela University; Spain	Marta Mndez Ruiz; University Of Murcia; Spain
Kata	Male Team	Austrian University Sport Federation; Austria	Erciyes University; Turkey	Austrian University Sport Federation; Austria	University Of Bonn; Germany
Kata	Female Team	Montenegrin University Sport Federation; Montenegro	Czech University Sport Federation; Czech Republic	Erciyes University; Turkey	*

== Results 2011 ==
Category		Winner	Silver Medallist	Bronze Medallist	Bronze Medallist
Male Kumite	-60 kg	Edin Muslic; University of Sarajevo; Bosnia and Herzegovina	Alexander Heimann; University DHfPG Saarbrücken; Germany	Oleh Filipovych; Lviv State University of physical culture Ukraine	Paulo Andre Gonçalves; University Of Minho; Portugal
Male Kumite	-67 kg	ThomasKaserer; University Of Linz; Austria	Jozo Dabovic; University Donja Gorica; Montenegro	Mikel LafuenteMoreno; Universidad Del Pais Vasco; Spain	Andrii Mokrynchuk; Lviv State University of physical culture Ukraine
Male Kumite	-75 kg	Stanislav Horuna; Lviv State University of physical culture Ukraine	Ivo Cvetkovski; Ss. Cyril and Methodius University Skopje; North Macedonia	Nermin Potur; University of Sarajevo; Montenegro	Illya Nikulin; Lviv State University of physical culture Ukraine
Male Kumite	-84 kg	AlenKupusovic; University of Sarajevo; Bosnia and Herzegovina	Stojan Tasevski; Ss. Cyril and Methodius University Skopje; North Macedonia	Heinrich Leistenschneider; University of Regensburg; Germany	Ognen Gruevski; Ss. Cyril And Methodius Univ In Skopje; North Macedonia
Male Kumite	+84 kg	Robb Callum; British Universities & Colleges Sport; United Kingdom	Almir Cecunjanin; University Donja Gorica; Montenegro	Zarko Arsovski; Goce Delcev University In Stip; North Macedonia	Martin Nestorovski; Ss. Cyril And Methodius University In Skopje; North Macedonia
Male Kumite	Team	University of Sarajevo; Bosnia and Herzegovina	Ss. Cyril and Methodius University Skopje; North Macedonia	Lviv State University of physical culture Ukraine	University Donja Gorica; Portugal
Female Kumite	-50 kg	Matea Ratkovic; University of Zagreb; Croatia	Desireé Christiansen; University WG Hamburg; Germany	Vesna Bezgovsek; University of Ljubljana; Slovenia	Meri Radicevska; Ss. Cyril and Methodius University Skopje; North Macedonia
Female Kumite	-55 kg	Suzana Mirkovic; University of Montenegro; Montenegro	Tamara Amador; University Of Basque Country; Spain	Sonja Anderl; University Of Vienna; Austria	Alba Esteve; Cardenal Herrera University; Spain
Female Kumite	-61 kg	Cristina Ferrer; University Of Barcelona; Spain	Jana Vojtikevicová; Comenius University; Slovakia	Stella Holczer; TU Kaiserslautern; Germany	Anzhelika Terliuga; Lviv State University of physical culture Ukraine
Female Kumite	+68 kg	Alice Goudie; British Universities & Colleges Sport; United Kingdom	Dagmara Kubinská; University Of Slovakia; Slovakia	Justyna Paczkowska; Pomeranian Medical University Szczecin; Poland	Natasha Stefanovska; Ss. Cyril and Methodius University Skopje; North Macedonia
Female Kumite	Team	Lviv State University of physical culture Ukraine	University Mediterranean; Montenegro	University of Montenegro; Montenegro	Universities of Slovakia; Slovakia
Kata	Male Individual	Matej Urík; Universities of Slovakia; Slovakia	Jan Urke; University of Gießen; Germany	Andre Vieira; Polytechnic Institute of Porto; Portugal	Mijat Vojvodic; University Mediterranean; Montenegro
Kata	Female Individual	Sandra Sánchez Jaime; Universidad de Castilla-la Mancha; Spain	Vlatka Kuik; University Of Zagreb; Croatia	Katarína Longová; Comenius University; Slovakia	Biserka Radulovic; University of Montenegro; Montenegro
Kata	Male Team	University of Linz; Austria	University Mediterranean; Montenegro	Erciyes University; Turkey	University of Gießen; Germany
Kata	Female Team	University of Montenegro; Montenegro	St. Kliment Ohridski University-Bitola; North Macedonia	Erciyes University; Turkey	Universidad Del Pais Vasco; Spain

== Results 2013 ==
Category		Winner	Silver Medallist	Bronze Medallist	Bronze Medallist
Male Kumite	-60 kg	Arsenije Tadic; University of Montenegro; Montenegro	Evgeni Alekhin; Tyumen State university Russia	Gökhan Kök; Marmara University; Turkey	Ikeh Filipovych; Lviv State University of Physical Culture; Ukraine
Male Kumite	-67 kg	Yves Martial Tadissi; National University of Public Service; Hungary	Stefan Pokorny; University of Salzburg; Austria	Niyazi Aliyev; University of Baku; Azerbaijan	Oleksandr Khakhula; Lviv State University of physical culture Ukraine
Male Kumite	-75 kg	Ivo Cvetkovski; Ss. Cyril and Methodiues University; North Macedonia	Ljubisa Mihailovic; University of Montenegro; Montenegro	András Virág; Óbudai Egyetem; Hungary	Alexandr Ivanov; Tyumen State University; Russia
Male Kumite	-84 kg	Bekat Jakupi; State University of Tetovo; North Macedonia	Filip Vujadinovic; University of Donja Gorica; Montenegro	Simon Antikj; Ss. Cyril And Methodius Univ In Skopje; North Macedonia	Nikola Ilovski; Ss. Cyril And Methodius Univ In Skopje; North Macedonia
Male Kumite	+84 kg	Zharko Arsovski; Goce Delcev University; North Macedonia	Martin Nestorovski; Ss. Cyril And Methodius Univ In Skopje; North Macedonia	Vuk Sukovic; University of Donja Gorica; North Macedonia	Almir Cecunjanin; University of Donja Gorica; North Macedonia
Male Kumite	Team	University of Montenegro; Montenegro	Ss. Cyril and Methodius University Skopje; North Macedonia	University of Novi Sad; Serbia	Lviv State University of Physical Culture; Ukraine
Female Kumite	-50 kg	Lucia Kováčiková; Matej Bel University; Slovakia	Jelena Milivojcevic; Studentski Grad, Belgrade; Serbia	Bettina Plank; Linz; Austria	Réka Molnár; Nemzeti Közszolgálati Egyetem; Hungary
Female Kumite	-55 kg	Kateryna Kryva; Lviv State University of Physical Culture; Ukraine	Jennifer Warling; Sportlycée; France	Ingrid Suchánková; University of Economics in Bratislave; Slovakia	Feyza Can; Istanbul Aydin University; Turkey
Female Kumite	-61 kg	Sanja Cvrkota; University of Novi Sad; Serbia	Stephanie Kaup; TU Wien; Austria	Natalina Sinpileva; St. Cyril and Methodius University of Skopje; North Macedonia	Halyna Melnyk; Lviv State University of Physical Culture; Ukraine
Female Kumite	-68 kg	Alisa Buchinger; University of Salzburg; Austria	Kamika Warda; Technical University of Lodz; Poland	Meltem Hocaoglu; Marmara University; Turkey	Lenka Foldeslová; Matej Bel University; Slovakia
Female Kumite	+68 kg	Nikola Bartha; Handicraft Professional School of Budapest; Hungary	Dominika Tatárová; Matej Bel University; Slovakia	Helena Kuusisto; Diaconia University of Applied Sciences; Finland	Rosa Liebold; University of Erfurt; Germany
Female Kumite	Team	University of Salzburg; Austria	Matej Bel University; Slovakia	University of Novi Sad; Serbia	University of Turku; Finland
Kata	Male Individual	Matej Urík; Constantine the Philosopher University; Slovakia	André Vieira; Instituote Superior de Engenharia do Porto; Portugal	Mijat Vojvodic; University mediterranean Montenegro	Kristian Angsten; Justus-Liebig Universität Gießen; Germany
Kata	Female Individual	Alexandra Feracci; Université de Corse; France	Puleksenija Jovanoska; St. Kliment Ohridski University; Russia	Katarína Longová; Comenius University; Slovakia	Biserka Radulovic; University of Montenegro; Montenegro
Kata	Male Team	University of Gießen; Germany	University Mediterranean; Montenegro	University of Montenegro; Montenegro	Istanbul Aydin University; Turkey
Kata	Female Team	St. Kliment Ohridski University-Bitola; North Macedonia	University of Valenica; Spain	Universidad del Pais Vasco; Spain	Istanbul Aydin University; Turkey
