= 2020 European Universities Games =

European Universities Games 2020
- Host city: Belgrade
- Country: Serbia
- Athletes: over 5500 (expected)
- Dates: Cancelled
- Website: www.eug2020.eu

The 2020 European University Games would have been the 5th biannual European Universities Games (EUG). It was scheduled to be held in Belgrade, Serbia from 12 July to 26 July. However, this event was postponed to 2021 due to the COVID-19 pandemic on 27 March 2020. The new dates proposed for the competition were from 14 July to 27 July 2021. On 5 May 2021 EUSA announced the games not being held. The event was planned involve 21 different sporting disciplines in the sports programme. It would have been organised by the European University Sports Association (EUSA) and University Sports Federation of Serbia with the special cooperation alongside University of Belgrade.

== Sport events ==
- Badminton
- Basketball
- Basketball 3x3
- Beach handball
- Beach soccer
- Beach volleyball
- Chess
- Football
- Futsal
- Handball
- Judo
- Para judo
- Karate
- Kickboxing
- Orienteering
- Rowing
- Table tennis
- Para table tennis
- Taekwondo
- Tennis
- Volleyball
- Water polo
