= European University Sports Association =

- Abbreviation: EUSA
- Formation: 1999; 27 years ago, Vienna
- Founded at: Vienna, Austria
- Type: Sports federation
- Headquarters: Ljubljana, Slovenia
- Members: 47 member associations
- President: (Croatia) Haris Pavletić
- Secretary General: (Slovenia) Matjaž Pečovnik
- Website: www.eusa.eu

European University Sports Association (EUSA) is an umbrella non-governmental (NGO) non-profit organisation, working in the field of university sport in Europe.

It links national university sport federations, universities, teams, individual competitors, volunteers and other partners in over 40 countries throughout Europe. In reaction to the 2022 Russian invasion of Ukraine, EUSA suspended the universities from Russia and Belarus and the representatives of the National University Sports Associations from Russia and Belarus from all EUSA events, blocked the organization of EUSA events in Russia and Belarus, and will not call upon the Members of EUSA Committees, Commissions, and Working Groups from Russia and Belarus for future EUSA meetings and activities.

== History ==
=== 1999–2009 ===
EUSA was founded in November 1999 in Vienna, Austria, by 25 founding member organisation as a federation and network of national university sports organisations from Europe.

In 2000, the first General Assembly of EUSA was held in Paris, France. Four more countries became members and the Assembly approved the introduction of European Championships based on university teams for 2001. In 2001, the first European University Championships were organised – in basketball and volleyball. In 2002, the First EUSA Symposium took place in Nicosia, Cyprus. The General Assembly established the EUSA Student Commission in order to enhance the participation of students in European university sports.

The federation constantly grew – both in membership, as well as activities. In 2004, there were 9 sports in the programme of the European University Championships. The 3rd EUSA Symposium was held in Falun, Sweden, and at the end of the year, EUSA published the 1st EUSA Magazine. At the General Assembly in Nottingham, the United Kingdom, the Assembly passed several amendments of the statutes. Among others, the new position of a Treasurer and a non-voting, paid Secretary General were installed.

In 2006, the sports events were renamed European Universities Championships, to stress the universities being the participants in the events. The first edition of the EUSA Convention for the Organisers of the European Universities Championships was organised in Eindhoven, Netherlands, where also the first EUSA multi-sport event was held, hosting championships in volleyball, football, and tennis as well as EUSA Cup in Water Polo.

EUSA celebrated its 10th anniversary in 2009; the main celebration was held at the General Assembly in Vienna, Austria. Special recognitions were awarded at the occasion of 10th anniversary for achievements 1999–2009. 15 European Universities Championships were organised, participation number reached 3000 student athletes, representing 417 universities from 32 countries.

=== 2010–19 ===
In 2010, EUSA opened its new office in Ljubljana, Slovenia, where the secretariat is located. The 1st European Universities Games to be held in 2012 were attributed to the city of Cordoba, Spain.

In 2011, 16 European Universities Championships were organised, participation number exceeded 3500 student athletes which set a new record for participation in EUSA's events. In November 2011, the 2014 European Universities Games were attributed to Rotterdam, Netherlands.

In 2012, at the annual General Assembly held in Maribor, Slovenia, Adam Roczek from Poland was elected as the new EUSA President, with 12 other Executive Members elected as well. The very first edition of the European Universities Games took place in Cordoba, Spain, involving over 2500 participants from 154 different universities and 32 countries taking part in 10 different sports. EUSA officially became accredited for the European Commission's Youth in Action programme of European Voluntary Service (EVS).

In 2013, 17 European Universities Championships were hosted across the continent, with 3x3 Basketball the latest sport to be integrated into the EUSA programme. At the EUSA Executive Committee meeting held in Ljubljana, Slovenia, two bids from Coimbra and Zagreb-Rijeka were considered, with the latter two Croatian cities attributed the rights to host the third edition of the European Universities Games in 2016. EUSA was rebranded, with the association adopting a new look and logo.

In 2014, the second edition of the European Universities Games took place in Rotterdam, Netherlands, involving over 2800 participants from 174 different universities and 34 countries, taking part in 10 different sports. The EUSA Conference and General Assembly took place in Denizli, Turkey, where the hosts for the 2018 European Universities Games were announced, with the Portuguese city of Coimbra chosen ahead of Finland's Tampere. During the European Universities Games in Rotterdam, EUSA launched its travelling EUSA Exhibition, which highlights the association's history, activities, responsibilities, partners and events. The European Paralympic Committee (EPC) and EUSA signed a Memorandum of Understanding, with events for athletes with disabilities scheduled to take place at the European Universities Games in 2016.

In 2015, 19 European Universities Championships were organised involving over 3800 participants from 40 different countries, as Sport Climbing and Chess made their first appearance on the Championships programme.

In 2016, The biggest edition of the European Universities Games to date was organised in the Croatian cities of Zagreb and Rijeka, which involved 5410 participants in total from 388 universities and 40 different countries. Sports for student-athletes with disabilities was included in the European Universities Games or the first time, with events in Para Table Tennis and Para Swimming. During the European Universities Games, a Rectors’ Conference was organised for the first time, with representatives from various universities and institutions present to discuss university sport. A new Executive Committee was elected at the annual General Assembly which took place in Wroclaw, Poland, with Adam Roczek reelected as the President of EUSA. On April 9, 2016 the EUSA General Assembly announced Belgrade, Serbia to host the 2020 Edition of EUG. In 2016 was also the year when EUSA Institute was established to manage projects and support development.

In 2017, for the first time, over 4000 participants from 43 countries were involved in the European Universities Championships, organised in 19 different sports in 14 different European host cities. After water polo was successfully featured as a demonstrative sport during the European Universities Games 2016, the first edition of the EUSA Water Polo Cup took place in Koper, Slovenia. 2017. After submitting an application the previous year, EUSA received participatory status with the Council of Europe.

In 2018, the fourth edition of the European Universities Games was held in Coimbra, Portugal, and involved over 4000 participants from 289 universities and 38 different countries. On the occasion of the European Universities Games, the annual photo competition was rebranded to the #MyEusa campaign, with EUSA launching its own Application for hand-held devices. The annual General Assembly took place in Madrid, Spain, where Kosovo (the youngest member) was welcomed as the 46th member of EUSA. Also, hosting rights of the 2022 European Universities Games were awarded to Łódź, Poland, and to the cities of Debrecen and Miskolc in Hungary for the 2024 Games .

In 2019, the European Universities Championships were organised in 21 different sports in 14 different host cities, attracting 5242 participants in total from 570 universities – a EUSA record. Four sports were included in the official programme for the first time including Beach Handball, Kickboxing, Orienteering, and Water Polo.

=== 2020–present ===
In 2020/2021, the European Universities Games Belgrade 2020 were first planned to take place from 12 until 25 of July, later postponed to 2021, and eventually cancelled due to Covid-19. It would have been Europe’s largest university sport event of the year, and the second-largest multisport event ever organised in Serbia, after the 2009 Summer Universiade. The expected number of participants was over 5500 and they would compete in more than 20 sports.

In 2022, the European Universities Games 2022 took place between July 17 and 30 in Łódź, Poland. The event featured 20 sports, attracting 4,459 participants, representing 417 universities from 37 countries. In 2022, also the European Universities Rowing Championship took place in Instanbul, Turkey, having 534 participants representing 71 universities from 16 countries.

In 2023, 22 different sporting competitions made up the season of the European Universities Championships in 2023, taking place across 16 different events in 15 host cities in 10 different countries. In total, 5,570 participants represented 524 universities from 40 countries participated in the 2023 season, making it the largest edition of the Championships in EUSA history by then.

In 2024, the main event was the European Universities Games 2024, hosted in two cities: Debrecen, Hungary and Miskolc, Hungary. The 7th edition of the European Universities Games was held under the slogan “More than Games” between July 12 and 24, 2024. It was the biggest university sport event organized in Hungary by then, hosting 4,503 participants, representing 400 universities from 36 European countries, featuring 17 sports. In the same year also the European Universities Rowing Championships were held in August in Zagreb, Croatia, hosting 393 participants, representing 68 universities from 17 European countries.

In 2025, a record season of the European Universities Championships was carried out. 18 sports events consisting of competitions in 24 sports unfolded in 17 European cities across 8 countries. In total, 6,058 participants representing 540 universities from 39 countries took part, breaking the previous seasonʼs record of participants from 2023.

In 2026, the European Universities Games Salerno 2026 will take place from July 18 until August 1 in Salerno, Italy. Over 4000 participants are expected to take part, representing over 400 universities from over 40 countries. Competitions will be organised in 13 sports disciplines. Apart from the European Universities Games, also two European Universities Championships will be organised in 2026: the European Universities Rowing Championship in Zagreb, Croatia in August, as well as European Universities Combat Sport Championships featuring Judo, Karate, Kickboxing and Taekwondo in Tirana, Albania in September.

== Mission ==
EUSA's mission is to maintain and develop regular communication between the national federations; to co-ordinate competitions, conferences, mass-sport-events and other activities both at university and national level; to represent university sport in general and the member federations in particular in relation to European organisations; to disseminate throughout Europe the ideals of university sport in close collaboration with the International University Sports Federation (FISU) and other European organisations.

== Sport events ==
EUSA is the licence-holder and coordinator of the European Universities Games, European Universities Championships, and European Students Run. EUSA may also award the title of EUSA Patronage to other university sport events in Europe.

There are currently 23 sports on the programme of European Universities Championships, including individual and team sports: badminton, basketball, basketball 3x3, beach volleyball, beach handball, bridge, chess, football, futsal, golf, handball, judo, karate, kickboxing, muaythai, orienteering, rowing, rugby sevens, sport climbing, table tennis, taekwondo, tennis, volleyball and water polo.

European Universities Games (EUG) is a multi-sport event, encompassing minimum 10 sports – 8 compulsory sports: basketball, football, futsal, handball, volleyball, badminton, tennis, table tennis and at least two optional sports. The first edition of the EUG was held in Cordoba, Spain between 13 and 24 July 2012. The second edition of the EUG was held between 24 July and 8 August 2014 in Rotterdam, Netherlands. The third edition was held in 2016 in Zagreb and Rijeka, Croatia. The fourth edition of the EUG was held in 2018 in Coimbra, Portugal.

In the past, the title of EUSA Cup could be awarded to those sport events that were yet to be considered to be put on the list of European Universities Championships. EUSA also grants its patronage to already established university sport events in Europe, helping to promote them through its networks.

== Educational programme ==
Apart from the sports programme and activities, EUSA also supports and encourages educational activities in the field of student sport. These are mainly realised by educational events organised by EUSA: EUSA Conferences, EUSA Forums, EUSA Seminars, EUSA Symposiums and EUSA Conventions.

EUSA Seminars are organised biannually, and usually accompany the General Assemblies and focus on subjects which are of interest for the member organisations. EUSA Conferences are also organised biannually, and focus in active inclusion of students and cooperation with the universities. EUSA Conventions are organised annually mainly as a training programme for the organisers of the European Universities Championships and European Universities Games. EUSA Forums accompany larger EUSA sports events, supporting the educational aspects of such events.

== Other projects ==
To support the development of University Sport in Europe, EUSA is also implementing or participating in different programs and projects.

Since 2005, through its Student Commission, EUSA has implemented a Volunteer Program. It allows student from all over Europe to take part in the different European Universities Championships as volunteers via a network connecting them to the organisers.

In 2011, EUSA became partner of an EU-funded project (funded by the European Commission in the preparatory Action in the field of Sport 2011–2012): the European Anti-Doping Initiative. This project had for chief goal to establish a European-wide "Anti-Doping Mentality" in the youth sector.

Since 2016, EUSA is carrying out projects under different topics through the EUSA Institute, based in Slovenia. Most of them are co-funded by the European Union through the Erasmus+ Programme (E+), European Solidarity Corps Programme (ESC), and/or the Citizens, Equality, Rights and Values Programme (CERV).

== Emblem, flag, and anthem ==
From 1999 until 2013 EUSA logo or emblem consisted of a blue letter "U" on a white background, with 12 yellow stars surrounding it. Below there was the abbreviation of the organisation – EUSA, in blue letters.

From 2014 until 2024, the logo showed European University Sports Association abbreviation "EUSA" in capital blue letters with a yellow star above letter "U". In the full formal version of the logo, below was the full name of the organisation.

In 2025, the new visual identity was introduced, with the logo displaying "EUSA" in small blue letters. The full formal version of the logo also displays the text "University Sport Europe", stylised in small letters. The name of the organisation remains the same despite the introduction of the new universitysportseurope branding and new visual identity.

The EUSA flag includes the EUSA emblem centred on a flag made out of white material. EUSA adopted the international university anthem Gaudeamus Igitur as its own anthem.

== Structure ==
Highest governing body of EUSA is the General Assembly which represents the members (currently 47 national university sports associations). The General Assembly elects the Executive Committee (consisting of 13 members) for a period of four years and it takes all the necessary decisions for the smooth running of the organisation. Permanent and ad hoc commissions advise the Executive Committee in their specialised areas (Technical Commission, Student Commission, Inclusion and Diversity Commission, Education and Science Commission, Control Commission, etc.).

EUSA is a member of the International University Sports Federation (FISU). Since October 2025, the current EUSA president is Haris Pavletić from Croatia.

== Members ==
- Albania – Albanian Federation of University Sport
- Armenia – Armenian Student Sports Federation
- Austria – Austrian University Sports Organisation
- Azerbaijan – Freewill Student Sport Society of Azerbaijan Republic "Genjlik"
- Belarus – The Republican Center of Physical Education and Sports for Pupils and Students
- Belgium – Belgium University Sports Federation
- Bosnia and Herzegovina – Sports Federation of Bosnia and Herzegovina - Committee for University Sports
- Bulgaria – Association for University Sport "Academic"
- Croatia – Croatian Academic Sports Federation
- Cyprus – Cyprus University Sports Federation
- Czechia – Czech University Sports Association
- Denmark – Danish Students Sports Association
- Estonia – Estonian Academic Sports Federation
- Finland – Finnish Student Sports Federation
- France – French University Sport Federation
- Georgia – University Sports Federation of Georgia
- Germany – German University Sports Federation
- Greece – Hellenic Committee for University Sport
- Hungary – Hungarian University Sports Federation
- Iceland – University of Iceland Students´Athletics Association
- Ireland – Student Sport Ireland
- Israel – Academic Sports Association
- Italy – Italian University Sport Centre
- Kosovo – Kosovo University Sports Federation
- Latvia – Latvian Universities Sports Federation
- Liechtenstein – University Sports Federation of Liechtenstein
- Lithuania – Lithuanian Students Sports Association
- Macedonia – University Sports Federation of Macedonia
- Malta – Malta University Sports Association
- Moldova – University Sports Federation of the Republic of Moldova
- Montenegro – Students Sports Association of Montenegro
- Netherlands – Student Sports Association the Netherlands
- Norway – Norwegian Association of University Sports
- Poland – University Sports Association of Poland
- Portugal – Portuguese Academic Federation of University Sport
- Romania – Romanian Schools and Universities Sports Federation
- Russia – Russian Students Sport Union
- San Marino – San Marino University Sports Association
- Serbia – University Sport Federation of Serbia
- Slovakia – Slovak University Sports Association
- Slovenia – Slovenian University Sports Association
- Spain – Spanish University Sport Committee
- Sweden – Swedish University Sports Federation
- Switzerland – Swiss University Sports
- Turkey – Turkish University Sports Federation
- Ukraine – Sports Students' Union of Ukraine
- United Kingdom – British Universities and Colleges Sport
