= 2012 European Universities Games =

1st European Universities Games
- Host city: Córdoba
- Country: Spain
- Nations: 32
- Athletes: 2,583
- Sport: 10
- Opening: July 14, 2012
- Closing: July 23, 2012
- Website: eusagames2012.com

The 2012 European Universities Games, were the first European Universities Games, hosted by Córdoba, Spain between July 13 and 23, 2012.

== Bid selection ==
The 1st edition of EUG was attributed by EUSA in March 2010 during the Executive Committee meeting in Vilnius. Other candidates were also Lisbon, Portugal and Łódź, Poland.

== Mascot ==
The mascot was an anthropomorphic fawn named Ukito. He was inspired by a bronze figure of a deer found in Medina Azahara, and his name comes from the organizing committee, UCO.

== Sports ==
Following is a list of the sports that was contested at the 2012 European Universities Games:

- Badminton (6)
- Basketball (2)
- Beach volleyball (2)
- Football (2)
- Futsal (2)
- Table tennis (6)
- Tennis (2)
- Volleyball (2)
- Handball (2)
- Rugby sevens (2)

== Participating nations ==
All member countries of the European University Sports Association were invited to take part in the 2012 European Universities Games. At the moment of invitation, the European University Sports Association counted 43 members.

Eventually Córdoba hosted 2583 participants in 253 teams from 151 universities coming from 32 countries.

== See also ==
- European University Sports Association
- 2016 European Universities Games
