= European Universities Games =

International multi-sport event

- Status: Active
- Location: Various

The European Universities Games (EUG) is an international multi-sport event, organized every two years for university athletes by the European University Sports Association (EUSA). The first edition was held in 2012 in Cordoba, Spain. On 9 April 2016 the EUSA General Assembly in Wrocław, Poland announced Belgrade, Serbia to host the 2020 Edition.

== Editions ==
Year	Games	Host	Date	Nations	Athletes	Ref
2012	1	Cordoba, Spain	13–23 July	32	2583	
2014	2	Rotterdam, Netherlands	24 July – 8 August	34	2830	
2016	3	Zagreb and Rijeka, Croatia	12–25 July	41	4786	
2018	4	Coimbra, Portugal	15–28 July	38	4027	
2020	5	~~Belgrade, Serbia~~	Cancelled			
2022	6	Łódź, Poland	17–30 July	37	4459	
2024	7	Debrecen and Miskolc, Hungary	12–24 July	36	4736	
2026	8	Salerno, Italy	July 18 - August 1	40	4500	
2028	9	Split, Croatia				
2030	10	Granada, Spain				

== Sport events ==
- 3x3 basketball
- Badminton
- Basketball
- Beach handball
- Beach soccer
- Beach volleyball
- Bridge
- Chess
- Climbing
- Football
- Futsal
- Golf
- Handball
- Judo
- Karate
- Kickboxing
- Orienteering
- Rowing
- Rugby
- Swimming
- Table tennis (details)
- Taekwondo
- Tennis
- Volleyball
- Water polo

== See also ==
- European Universities Championships
- FISU World University Games
- International Erasmus Games
- University and college sport
